= Partner relationship management =

Software methodology

Partner relationship management (PRM), used especially in IT and cybersecurity industries, is a system of methodologies, strategies, software, and web-based capabilities which help a vendor to manage channel partner relationships. Common types of channel partners include resellers, value-added resellers (VARs), managed service providers (MSPs), managed security service providers (MSSPs), independent software vendors (ISVs), alliance partners, referral partners, hyperscalers, and affiliate partners such as influencers.

According to a 2023 report, "The 12 PRM Providers That Matter Most And How They Stack Up", by Forrester, the strongest performers were Salesforce, Unifyr (formerly Zift Solutions), Magentrix, Impartner, ZINFI Technologies, Mindmatrix, and 360insights.

The general purpose of a PRM is to enable vendors to better manage their partners through the introduction of reliable systems, automated processes, optimization tools, and procedures for interacting with them. Web-based PRM systems typically include a content management system, a partner and customer contact database, and a partner portal which allows partners to log in and interact with a vendor's sales opportunity database and obtain product, pricing, and training information. This helps vendors to streamline processes, as well as to collect and assess data about various stages of the partner sales funnel. There are a number of solution providers who offer PRM software to companies who rely heavily on a PRM solution to stay relevant in their respective industries.

== PRM tools ==
Partner relationship management tools available include:

- Market development funds request programs
- Training, certification, and accreditation automation
- Deal registration programs, under which vendors register the partner who has brought them a potential deal with a qualified prospect as their intended or preferred channel for a subsequent sale, allowing the registered partner a discount on the sale price. Programs are sometimes criticized for their complexity
- Indirect sales pipeline reporting
- Joint business planning
- Reward and loyalty programs
- Content library
- Partner marketing automation tools

== Trends ==
Gartner reports that PRM applications have mainly been adopted by companies in the hardware technology, software technology, telecommunication, and manufacturing industries.

The PRM application market has expanded significantly in the last 10 years. It's also grown steadily due to the recent trend towards a strategic partner-first approach at companies like Dell and others.

== See also ==
- Channel partner
- Customer relationship management
- Supplier relationship management
- Facility management
- Software as a service
