= Brainbench =

Online education company

- Type: Subsidiary
- Industry: Testing in information Technology and other fields
- Founded: 1998
- Defunct: 31 August 2022
- Headquarters: US
- Services: Online testing and certifications
- Parent: SHL
- Website: http://www.brainbench.com/ at the Wayback Machine (archived 2 September 2022)

Brainbench was an online education company founded in January 1998 (formerly known as Tekmetrics.com until 8 December 1999) and later acquired by PreVisor in 2006. PreVisor merged with SHL in 2011; SHL was acquired by the Corporate Executive Board in 2012. CEB was acquired by Gartner in 2017. CEB's Talent Assessment business was acquired from Gartner by Exponent Private Equity in 2018. The CEB Talent Assessment Business was re-branded as SHL in 2018.

== Services ==
Brainbench provided online certifications mainly in the Information Technology field and others in general. The company provided services to more than 5,000 corporate clients and over 6 million individuals. Some of Brainbench's 630 exams were available free of charge, while others were administered for a fee.

Brainbench ended their services on 31 August 2022.

== Testing ==
Brainbench provided online tests for registered users on its website. The tests included paid tests, which required payment in order to take the exams, free tests, and beta tests (pre-release tests where no certificates were earned upon completion).
