= CEB Inc. =

Former business consulting company

CEB
- Type: Subsidiary
- Industry: Advisory Services
- Founded: 1983; 43 years ago in Washington, D.C.
- Fate: Acquired by Gartner
- Headquarters: CEB Tower, Arlington, Virginia, USA
- Key people: Thomas L. Monahan III, Chairman and CEO; Melody Jones, CAO; Richard Lindahl, CFO; Haniel Lynn, Group President; Warren Thune, Group President; Kurt Reisenberg, CCO
- Revenue: US$ 904 million ▲ (2013)
- Operating income: US$ 109.2 million ▲ (2012)
- Net income: US$ 105 million ▲ (2013)
- Number of employees: 4,100
- Website: www.cebglobal.com

CEB, formerly Corporate Executive Board, now a part of Gartner, was a company providing best practice research, benchmarks, and decision support tools to business leaders in HR, Finance, IT, Marketing, Sales, Customer Service, Strategy, R&D, Procurement, Legal, and Compliance functions globally. It was one of the first firms to offer a subscription pricing model for insights and advice, challenging the prevailing consulting delivery model and paving the way for subscription-as-a-service ("SaaS") pricing models now favored by software companies. CEB identified and profiled proven best practices from the world's top performing companies to help senior executives and their teams address key business challenges across key functions. Gartner announced its acquisition of CEB in January 2017, completed the acquisition in April 2017, and integrated the company in July 2018.

== History ==
CEB offered its first subscription research program to retail banking executives, the Council on Financial Competition, in 1983 when it was part of The Advisory Board Company. In late 1993 it began offering similar syndicated research subscriptions for functional executives, starting with the Corporate Leadership Council (for HR executives) and followed by the Corporate Strategy Board. 1997, the company split from Advisory Board Company and opened a new office in London.

CEB went public in 1999 on the NASDAQ exchange at a time when most IPOs were the first generation of Internet startups. Unlike most of those companies, CEB was profitable, continued to grow, and ultimately achieved a valuation over $3 billion at its peak. James J. McGonigle was the company's general manager from 1995-1999, and chairman and CEO from 1999 to 2005. Tom Monahan was appointed CEO in 2005. At that time, the company expanded offerings to accommodate middle market companies. In 2007, the company expanded domestically and opened offices in San Francisco and Chicago.

The company left Washington, D.C., in 2008 to move its headquarters to the Rosslyn neighborhood of Arlington, Virginia.

In May 2015, the company changed its legal name to "CEB Inc."

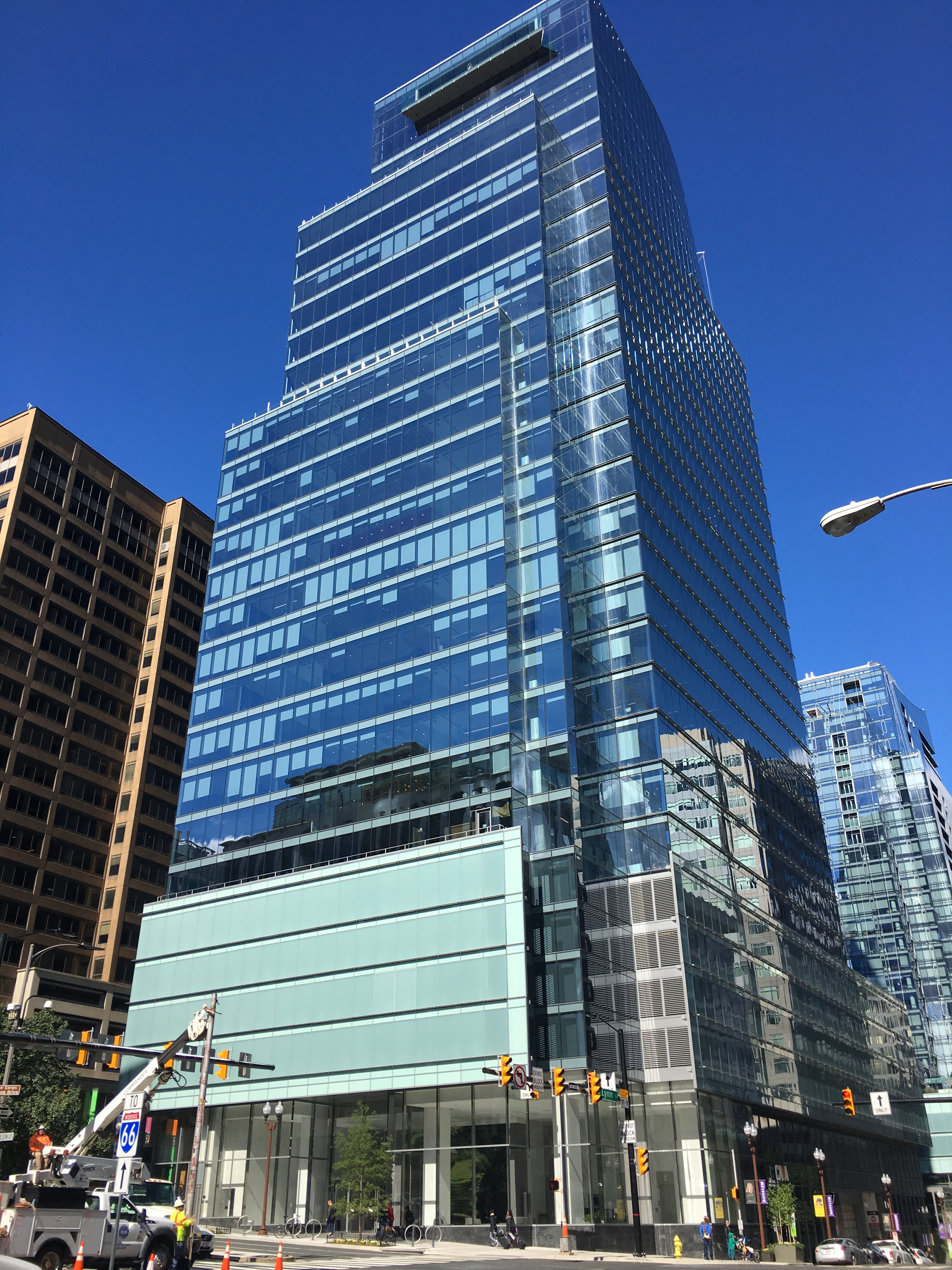
CEB Tower in the Rosslyn neighborhood of Arlington, VA.

=== Acquisitions ===
In 2009, CEB acquired Toronto-based Warrillow & Co. and the financial services firm, TowerGroup.

In May 2010, the company acquired consumer research and advisory company, Iconoculture. Later that year, CEB transferred listing of its common stock from NASDAQ to the NYSE, and began trading on 20 August 2010.

The company acquired Baumgartner & Partner, a Germany-based consulting firm in October 2011. In July 2012 CEB acquired Saville and Holdsworth Ltd. (SHL), its largest acquisition to date.

In March 2014, CEB acquired KnowledgeAdvisors. In September 2015, it acquired and integrated WANTED Technologies.

In May 2016, CEB acquired Evanta Ventures, Inc. ("Evanta") for $275 million. Evanta is based in Portland, Oregon, and provides events, platforms and information offerings to train IT-security, human-resources and finance staff in collaboration and best practices.

On January 5, 2017 Gartner said it agreed to buy CEB in a cash-and-stock deal worth $2.6 billion. The acquisition concluded in April 2017. On July 16, 2018, the CEB brand was discontinued.

== Publications ==
The company has published three books through Penguin Group. The Challenger Sale by Brent Adamson and Matthew Dixon was published on November 10, 2011. In 2013, Matthew Dixon with Nick Toman, and Rick DeLisi wrote The Effortless Experience, published on September 12. The third book, The Challenger Customer was written by Matthew Dixon, Brent Adamson, Nick Toman, and Patrick Spenner and published on September 8, 2015.

== Stock information ==
CEB's IPO occurred February 22, 1999 at an offer price of $19. The company, previously on NASDAQ, entered into an alliance with NYSE Euronext in 2010 and began actively trading as CEB in 2012.

== See also ==
- Gartner
- The Challenger Sale
