= Sales process engineering =

Systematic design of sales processes

Sales process engineering is the systematic design of sales processes done in order to make sales more effective and efficient.

It can be applied in functions including sales, marketing, and customer service.

== History ==
As early as 1900–1915, advocates of scientific management, such as Frederick Winslow Taylor and Harlow Stafford Person, recognized that their ideas could be applied not only to manual labour and skilled trades but also to management, professions, and sales. Person promoted an early form of sales process engineering. At the time, postwar senses of the terms sales process engineering and sales engineering did not yet exist; Person called his efforts "sales engineering".

Corporations the 1920s through 1960s sought to apply analysis and synthesis to improve business functions. After the publication of the paper "If Japan Can... Why Can't We?", the 1980s and 1990s saw the emergence of a variety of approaches, such as business process reengineering, Total Quality Management, Six Sigma, and Lean Manufacturing.

James Cortada was one of IBM's management consultants on market-driven quality. His book TQM for Sales and Marketing Management was the first attempt to explain the theory of TQM in a sales and marketing context. Todd Youngblood, another ex-IBMer, in his book The Dolphin and the Cow (2004) emphasized "three core principles": continuous improvement of the sales process, metrics to quantitatively judge the rate and degree of improvement, and a well-defined sales process. Meanwhile, another executive from IBM, Daniel Stowell, had participated in IBM's project known as the "Alternate Channels Marketing Test." The idea was to incorporate direct response marketing techniques to accomplish the job of direct salespeople, and the initiative was quite successful.

Paul Selden's "Sales Process Engineering, A Personal Workshop" was a further attempt to demonstrate the applicability of the theory and tools of quality management to the sales function.

== Rationale ==
The sales decision process is a formalized sales process companies use to manage the decision process behind a sale. SDP "is a defined series of steps you follow as you guide prospects from initial contact to purchase."

Reasons for having a well-thought-out sales process include seller and buyer risk management, standardized customer interaction during sales, and scalable revenue generation. Approaching the subject from a "process" point of view offers an opportunity to use design and improvement tools from other disciplines and process-oriented industries.

This logical structuring and architecturalization of the entire process of sales are generally called sales process engineering. This field combines data analytics and automation technologies, established KPIs, and performance optimization methods to define each step of the sales path, from lead generation through closing and follow-up. Its main aim is to build, improve, and develop a repeatable system that raises productivity levels, consistency, and measurable results within an organisation or a team.

To provide an example, a SaaS company like Salesforce will have qualification criteria like BANT (Budget, Authority, Need, Timeline), build email sequences, build lead-scoring models, and track conversion measures on a CRM dashboard to design its sales process.

Similar to previous findings, multinational companies like IBM and platform-driven B2B ecosystems like Alibaba use sales process engineering in enterprise sales, standardisation of pipeline phases, predictive analytics used to forecast revenue, and marketing automation systems coupled with sales personnel. The resulting systems are applied in financial institutions, insurance companies, large B2B companies, and technology start-ups, where predictability and scalability are crucial.

Conversely, the construct of sales process technique is a summation of the individual sales representative-specific strategies and skills used in the engineered system. These involve techniques for objection management, negotiation, closing, questioning modalities, and persuasive techniques. These are operational and behavioural tactics, depending on how a sales professional goes about his or her interaction with potential customers to persuade them to make a decision.

A representative who uses the Neil Rackham SPIN Selling system will guide prospects toward value creation by asking Situation, Problem, Implication, and Needs-Payoff questions.

Another example is the Challenger approach, developed by Matthew Dixon, in which sales personnel offer customers new insights that can prompt them to change their cognitive frameworks.

These methods are used in consultative sales settings where communication skills, including pharmaceutical delivery, property transactions, automotive sales, and enterprise software negotiations critically influence transaction outcomes.

Simply stated, sales process engineering defines the scaffold, and sales process technique controls the effectiveness of individual performance within the scaffold.

The system is made with the assistance of engineering, but it is technique that drives the operational efficacy of the system.

== Modern sales process automation ==
The emergence of customer relationship management (CRM) software, sales engagement platforms, and artificial intelligence has fundamentally transformed how sales processes are designed, executed, and optimized. What was once a manual engineering discipline has become a technology-enabled practice in which process logic is encoded directly into software.

=== CRM systems and pipeline management ===
Modern CRM platforms such as Salesforce, HubSpot, Close, and Microsoft Dynamics 365 allow organizations to encode each stage of the engineered sales process—qualification criteria, required activities, exit conditions—directly into software workflows. This shifts process enforcement from managerial oversight to systemic automation, and enables real-time analytics on pipeline health, conversion rates, and forecast accuracy. Gartner has recognized Salesforce Sales Cloud as a Leader in its Magic Quadrant for Sales Force Automation Platforms for eighteen consecutive years, reflecting the maturity and centrality of CRM to modern process engineering.

=== Sales sequences and cadence automation ===
Sales engagement platforms—including Outreach, Salesloft, and Apollo—introduced the concept of the sales cadence: a predefined, multi-channel sequence of touchpoints (email, phone, social media) timed and triggered automatically based on prospect behavior. These tools encode outreach logic that previously required manual judgment, enabling sales development representatives to execute consistent, measurable engagement at scale. Research from McKinsey indicates that approximately one-third of all sales tasks are amenable to automation, though the greatest gains come from augmenting human judgment rather than replacing it entirely.

=== Artificial intelligence and agentic sales systems ===
Artificial intelligence, including machine learning and generative AI (GenAI), has introduced a further evolution: systems capable not just of executing predefined process steps, but of adapting them dynamically based on buyer signals, predicting outcomes, and recommending or taking next-best actions autonomously. Gartner projects that by 2026, B2B sales organizations using generative-AI-embedded sales technologies will reduce time spent on prospecting and meeting preparation by more than 50%, and that by 2028 at least 15% of day-to-day sales decisions will be made autonomously by AI agents.

Academic research has begun to distinguish among three modes of AI deployment in sales: augmentation (AI assists the salesperson), automation (AI substitutes for specific tasks), and autonomy (AI agents independently orchestrate multi-step workflows such as lead generation, qualification, and outreach). The proliferation of AI across the sales function has driven a surge in related research; a 2025 bibliometric analysis found that academic interest in AI in sales reached a peak relative popularity score in Google Trends, reflecting the domain's growing importance across both theory and practice. Modern CRM platforms have increasingly embedded these capabilities directly into the sales process design layer; according to Salesforce's annual State of Sales research, sales representatives spend only 28 percent of their week actually selling, with the remainder consumed by administrative tasks that automation is increasingly designed to eliminate.

== See also ==
- Sales management
- Theory of constraints

== Bibliography ==
- Dawson, Michael (2005), The Consumer Trap: Big Business Marketing in American Life, Urbana, Illinois, USA: University of Illinois Press, ISBN 0-252-07264-2.
- Selden, Paul H. (1997), Sales Process Engineering: A Personal Workshop, Milwaukee, Wisconsin, USA: ASQ Quality Press, p. 23, ISBN 0-87389-418-9.
- Youngblood, Todd (2004), The Dolphin And The Cow: How To Sell More Faster With Sales Process Engineering, YPS Group.
- Kreindler, Phil (2016), Customerized Selling®: Learn How Customers Want You To Sell, Infoteam Sales Process Consulting AG, ISBN 978-3-033-05471-4.
