= Channel partner =

Company that markets another's products or services

A channel partner is a company that partners with a manufacturer or producer to market and sell the manufacturer's products, services, or technologies. This is usually done through a co-branding relationship. Channel partners may be distributors, vendors, retailers, consultants, systems integrators (SI), technology deployment consultancies, and value-added resellers (VARs) and other such organizations.

== Managed services channel partner ==
The Managed Services Channel Program (MSCP) defines managed services based on market and industry best practices, validates a provider’s managed service against those standards, and offers escalating rewards tied to the value delivered.

== Outsourcing channel partner ==
The Outsourcing Channel Program is designed for partners who assume management of customer assets for multiple years across multiple technologies, either at the customer site or at another location like a remote data center.

== Referral partner ==
The referral partner is any individual, usually a professional consultant, existing customer, or sales professional, who can refer new customers to the manufacturer in any number of ways. Increasingly, companies are taking advantage of this type of partner as more and more individuals find work independently consulting and referring manufacturer solutions to their clients—which in essence provides a low cost way for manufacturers to manage their sales efforts.

== Partner relationship management (PRM) software ==
With the increased reliance on the channel to drive sales efforts, technology has emerged to help support these efforts. Partner relationship management (PRM) is the term most widely used to refer to this type of technology.
