= Rosslyn Twin Towers =

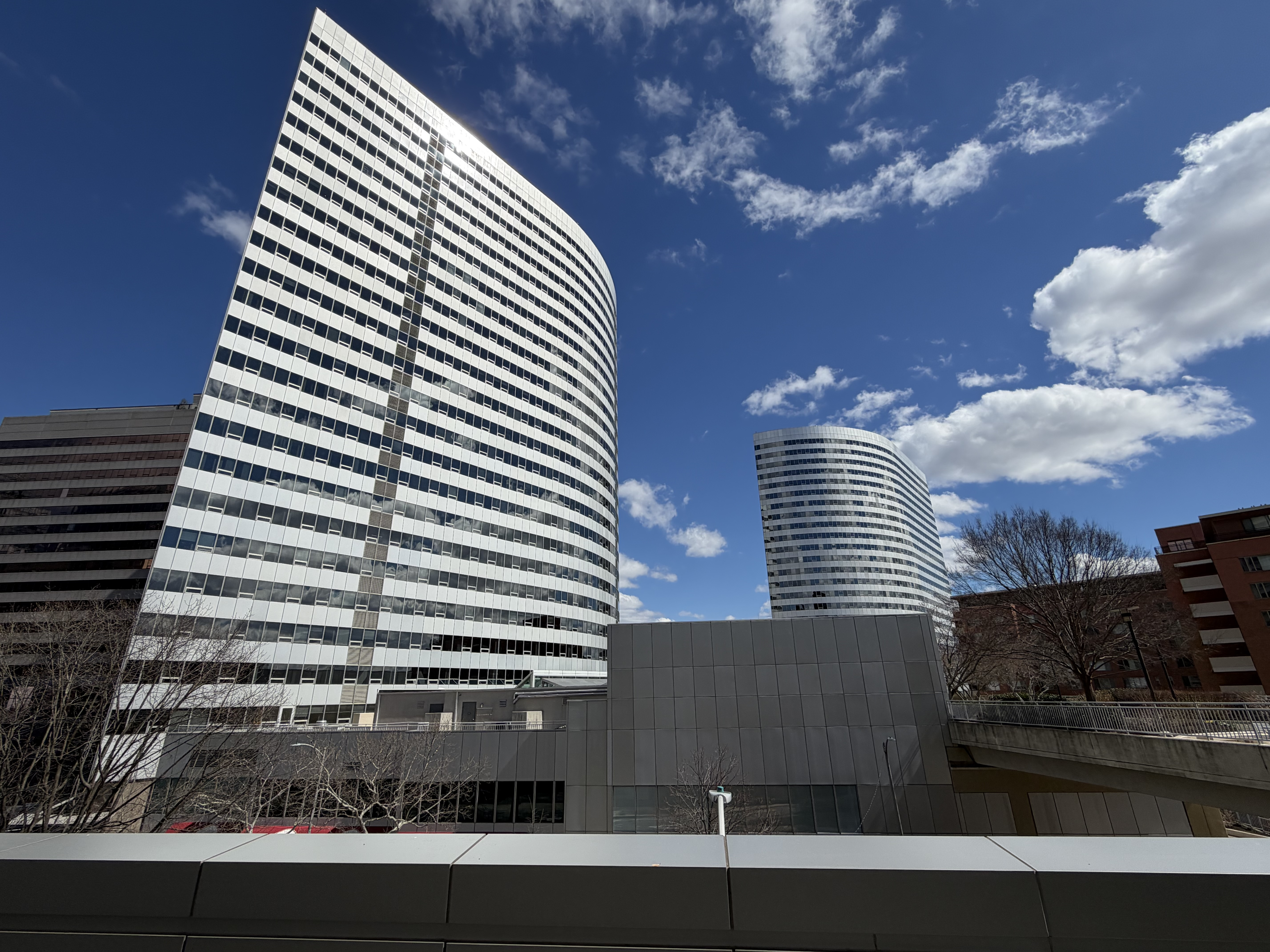
- Rosslyn Twin Towers in 2026
- Interactive map of the Rosslyn Twin Towers area

General information
- Status: Completed
- Type: Office, ground floor retail, observation deck
- Location: 1000 and 1100 Wilson Boulevard; Arlington, Virginia
- Coordinates: 38.8943167°N 77.0696500°W
- Elevation: ~50 ft (15 m)
- Completed: 1980-82

Height
- Antenna spire: 381 ft (116 m)

Technical details
- Floor count: 26-27
- Floor area: 1.2 million square feet (110,000 m^{2})

Design and construction
- Architects: Hellmuth, Obata & Kassabaum, KCF-SHG Inc.
- Main contractor: Monday Properties

The Rosslyn Twin Towers are twin office buildings located at 1000 and 1100 Wilson Boulevard in the Rosslyn neighborhood of Arlington, Virginia. They were the tallest buildings in the Washington metropolitan area for three decades until the completion of 1812 N Moore, a block away, in 2013. They remain the tallest twin towers in the region and the commonwealth of Virginia.

The buildings are home to the headquarters of Politico and WJLA-TV, and were formerly home to the headquarters of Gannett Company/USA Today.

The towers are part of a complex that features retail, and televisions and news tickers visible from the nearby intersection. Arlington County approved construction of rooftop decks for each tower in 2015. The project was completed in 2018.

== History ==
The project, initially known as Arland Towers, was first proposed and approved by the Arlington County Board in 1978 on the site of a shopping center, at a projected cost of $60 million. They were among several tall buildings proposed around the time for Rosslyn, which did not have any buildings taller than 15 stories, as developers realized the potential to build large projects close to Washington, D.C., while avoiding the city's height limit.

The towers and other projects alarmed federal officials, who feared they would disrupt views from the National Mall and nearby. The Commission of Fine Arts, National Park Service, General Services Administration and National Capital Planning Commission asked the county board later in 1978 to rescind its approval, but the board declined, and construction started. Interior Secretary Cecil Andrus, who is responsible for the National Mall, sued the county government that year to block the towers and other projects, arguing they would ruin the skyline. The District Court for the Eastern District of Virginia rejected the lawsuit, saying the federal government had not demonstrated that the buildings would be a nuisance.

== See also ==
- List of tallest buildings in Arlington, Virginia
- List of tallest buildings in Virginia
- List of tallest twin buildings and structures
- Tysons Corner, Virginia is home to twin towers with an identical shape, albeit shorter
