= Sales decision process =

A sales decision process is a formalized sales process companies use to manage the decision process behind a sale. SDP "is a defined series of steps you follow as you guide prospects from initial contact to purchase". This method includes planning specific timelines and milestones at the beginning of a sale, both internally and with the business customer. The process can be managed with special purpose SDP software. SDP software allows customers and vendors to work collaboratively throughout a sales cycle with the objective of closing larger/longer deals faster. An SDP system is typically integrated with software that automates some of the sales process (Sales Force Automation) and one that helps manage the customer data (Customer relationship management). SDP manages the sales process while the SFA and CRM manage the customer.

== Overview ==
SDP takes the concept of customer driven sales automation and turns it on its head. It recognizes that a business cannot control individuals or teams but it can control the company’s sales process. SDP allows customers and vendors to work collaboratively throughout the sales cycle. This collaboration drives the sales toward a final decision. SDP steps can include:

- Presentations
- Demos
- Buy-in from stakeholders
- Budget approval
- Business Cases
- Case Studies
- Reference visits
- Contract negotiations

Each sales cycle is essentially a project with associated milestones, tasks, and deliverables that require participation, coordination, and contributions from multiple individuals on both the customer side and sales side.

According to IT industry experts, investing in decision process software can make a competitive difference in any industry. An article in the Harvard Business Review by Andrew McAfee and Eric Brynjolfsson, says market competition in the United States is heating up “not because more products are becoming digital but because more processes are. Just as a digital photo or a web-search algorithm can be endlessly replicated quickly and accurately by copying the underlying bits, a company’s unique business process can now be propagated with much higher fidelity across the organization by embedding it in enterprise information technology. As a result, an innovator with a better way of doing things can…dominate an industry.”

== Advantages ==
Historically, the sales decision process has been managed through the common sales practice of Close Plans or Solution Evaluation Plans that pass information in Excel or Word Documents back-and-forth between customer and vendor. This creates challenges with version control, data latency, poor visibility, and lack of productive participation.

With SDP software user can benefit from:

1. Faster Close Rates and Lower Cost of Sale: Instead of filling-in, filing, and sending Excel or Word based Close Plans, users can simply update the SDP on-line. SDP can generate milestones, assign tasks, send reminders, and track completion dates. A tighter sales cycle equals faster close rates and lowers the overall costs of sale.

2. A Competitive Advantage: SDP technology drives teamwork, greater efficiencies, and clearer communication during each step of the sales cycle giving companies an edge over their competition.

3. Reliable Close Dates: SDP provides effective collaboration between customer and vendor on every step in the sales cycle to create on-going check-points and a mutually agreed upon close date.

4. One Source of Truth: Instead of passing Word or Excel based close plans back-and-forth that can suffer from version control and scattered islands of information – SDP provides secure web-based access from any browser to quickly view up-to-the-minute consolidated information (including GANTT charts) on the status of the sale. Timely updates accurately set expectations for the customer, sales management, and the entire extended sales team.

== Disadvantages ==
Problems can occur if the company implementing a new SDP system does not outline a realistic sales approach to roadmap the process. If the sales team does not perceive SDP as a benefit, they are unlikely to buy into the process and use the software effectively.

== Implementation strategies ==
Sales and marketing experts recommend that companies speak with their salespeople and their customers for insight in order to achieve a successful implementation of a formalized SDP system. “A thorough understanding of the process is required to compete effectively, according to Pat Thull, COO/Partner of Prime Resource Group Inc.” The smart performer today, and the smart leader, implements a system that properly navigates the process to getting the job done right. Once that is complete, it is imperative to “sell” the sales team. Sales teams need to understand how SDP will help them better manage and close deals. This is what gives them the confidence and drive to use the system.
