= List of tallest buildings in Arlington County, Virginia =

Tall buildings in Arlington County
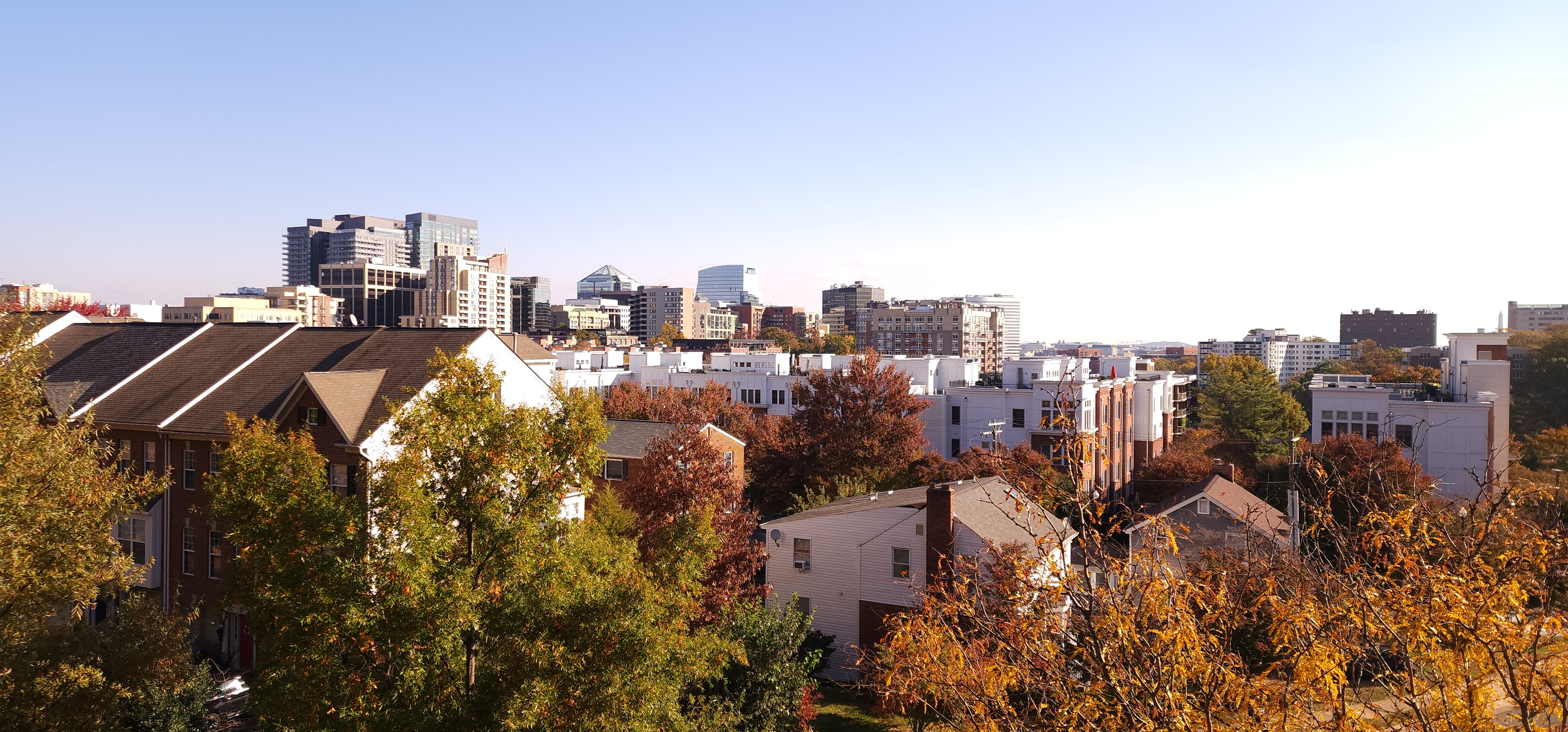
- Skyline of Rosslyn in 2024
- Population: 243,760 (2025)
- Tallest building: Central Place Tower (2017)
- Tallest building height: 391 ft (119 m)
- Major clusters: Rosslyn; Pentagon City; Crystal City; Courthouse; Ballston

Number of tall buildings (2025)
- Taller than 100 m (328 ft): 7

Number of tall buildings — feet
- Taller than 200 ft (61.0 m): 40
- Taller than 300 ft (91.4 m): 14

This is a list of the tallest buildings in Arlington County, Virginia, ranked by height. Due to the height restrictions imposed in Washington D.C., many of the tallest buildings in the D.C metropolitan area are constructed in Arlington, right across the Potomac River from Washington.

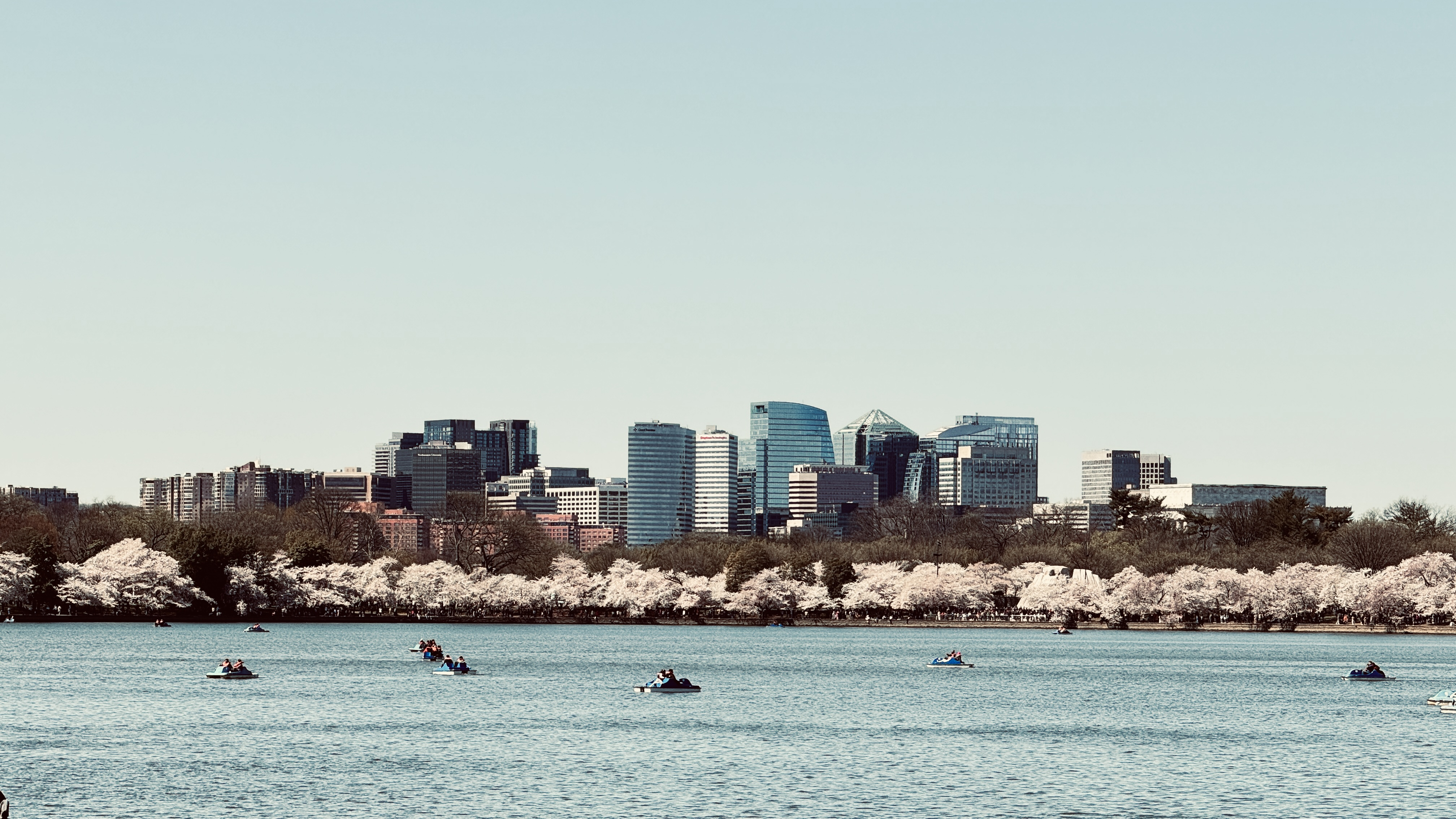
The Rosslyn neighborhood in 2024, seen from across the Potomac River from the National Mall in Washington D.C.

Under Virginia law, towns may be incorporated within counties; however, the state does not permit the creation of any new incorporated towns within a county that has a population density greater than 1,000 persons per square mile. As such, Arlington has no incorporated towns within its borders, but a number of neighborhoods within Arlington are commonly referred to by name as if they were distinct towns. The largest and most prominent of these neighborhoods are Rosslyn, Pentagon City, Crystal City, Courthouse, and Ballston. Each are located along the Blue, Orange, Silver and/or Yellow lines of the Washington Metro rail system and contain Arlington's tallest buildings.

== Map of tallest buildings ==
The following map shows the distribution of buildings taller than 200 ft (61 m) in Arlington County. Individual buildings are colored by their decade of completion and numbered by their height rank. Named clusters of three or more buildings are shown in further detail below.

Buildings taller than 200 ft (91 m) in Arlington County.
- 1980s
- 1990s
- 2000s
- 2010s
- 2020s
1 Central Place Tower
2 1812 North Moore Street
3 Hilton at The Key
4 Rosslyn Twin Tower One
5 Rosslyn Twin Tower Two
6 Central Place Residential Tower
7 1801 North Lynn Street
8 Metropolitan Park Jasper
9 Metropolitan Park Merlin
10 Turnberry Tower
11 Two Waterview Place
12 One Waterview Place
13 The Grace
14 The Reva
15 Rosslyn Metro Center II
16 Evo at The Highlands
17 Rosslyn Towers at The Key
18 Valen
19 4040 Wilson Boulevard
20 The Whitmer
21 4000 North Fairfax
22 Aubrey at The Highlands
23 The Bartlett at Metropolitan Park
24 J Rivelle
25 Arlington Tower
26 Hilton Arlington & Towers
27 Ballston Place
28 1101 Wilson Boulevard
29 The Zoe
30 Bella Vista
31 The Commodore
32 Residences at Liberty Center
33 Crystal Plaza II
34 AVA Ballston Square I
35 AVA Ballston Square II
36 Meridian at Ballston Commons
37 The Continental at Ballston
38 Quincy Plaza
39 Three Ballston Plaza
40 The Wendy

=== By cluster ===
Rosslyn and Courthouse
Buildings taller than 200 ft (61 m)
- 1980s
- 1990s
- 2000s
- 2010s
- 2020s
1 Central Place Tower
2 1812 North Moore Street
3 Hilton at The Key
4 Rosslyn Twin Tower One
5 Rosslyn Twin Tower Two
6 Central Place Residential Tower
7 1801 North Lynn Street
10 Turnberry Tower
11 Two Waterview Place
12 One Waterview Place
15 Rosslyn Metro Center II
16 Evo at The Highlands
17 Rosslyn Towers at The Key
22 Aubrey at The Highlands
24 J Rivelle
25 Arlington Tower
28 1101 Wilson Boulevard
31 The Commodore
40 The Wendy

Ballston
Buildings taller than 200 ft (61 m)
- 1980s
- 1990s
- 2000s
- 2010s
- 2020s
19 4040 Wilson Boulevard
21 4000 North Fairfax
26 Hilton Arlington & Towers
27 Ballston Place
32 Residences at Liberty Center
34 AVA Ballston Square I
35 AVA Ballston Square II
36 Meridian at Ballston Commons
37 The Continental at Ballston
38 Quincy Plaza
39 Three Ballston Plaza

Pentagon City and Crystal City
Buildings taller than 200 ft (61 m)
- 1980s
- 1990s
- 2000s
- 2010s
- 2020s
8 Metropolitan Park Jasper
9 Metropolitan Park Merlin
13 The Grace
14 The Reva
18 Valen
20 The Whitmer
23 The Bartlett at Metropolitan Park
29 The Zoe
30 Bella Vista
33 Crystal Plaza II

== Tallest buildings ==
List of completed buildings in Arlington that stand at least 200 feet (61 m) tall based on standard height measurement.This includes spires and architectural details but does not include antenna masts. Buildings tied in height are sorted by year of completion and then alphabetically.

Was the tallest building in Arlington County upon completion
*Topped out but not yet completed

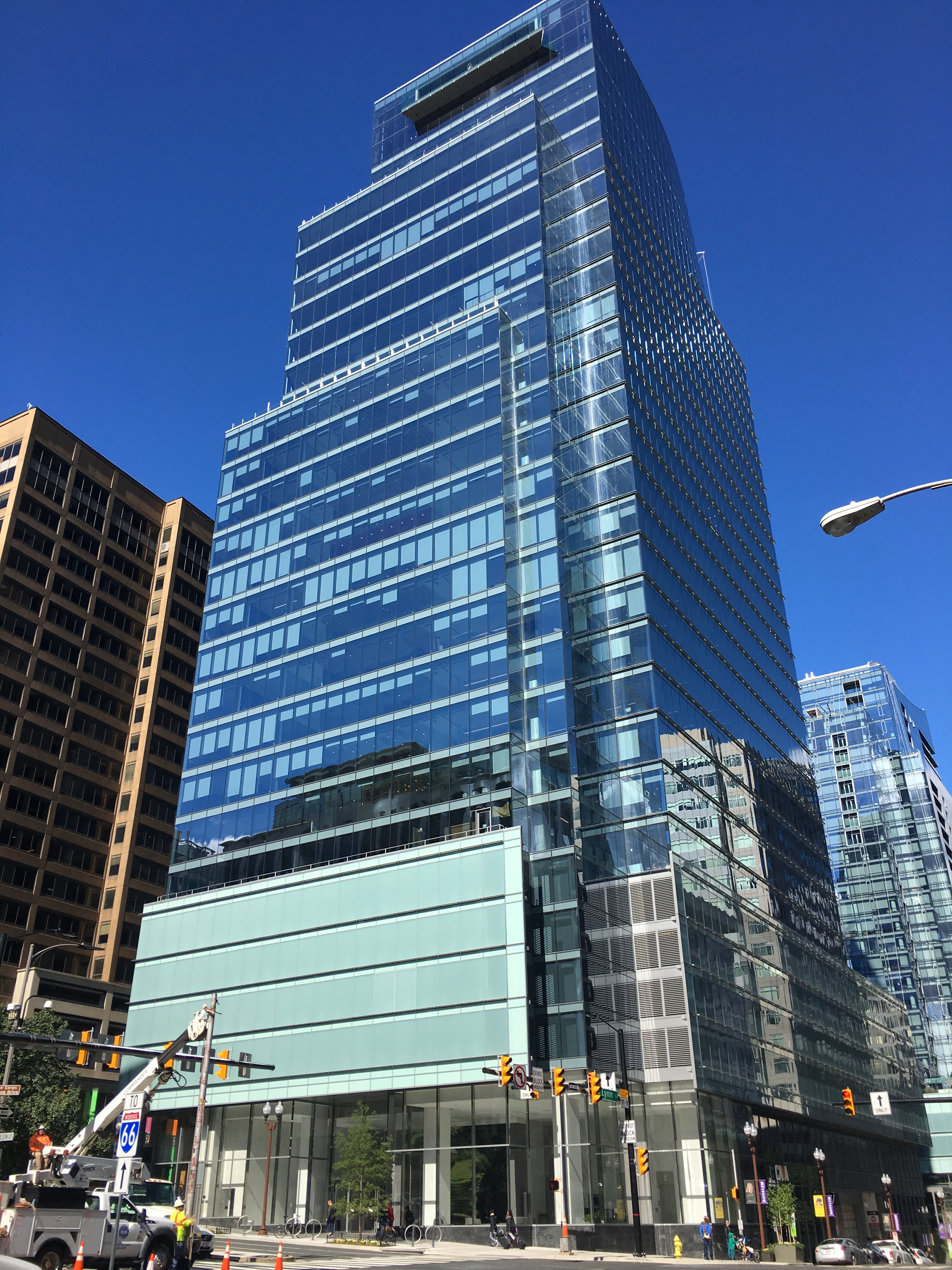
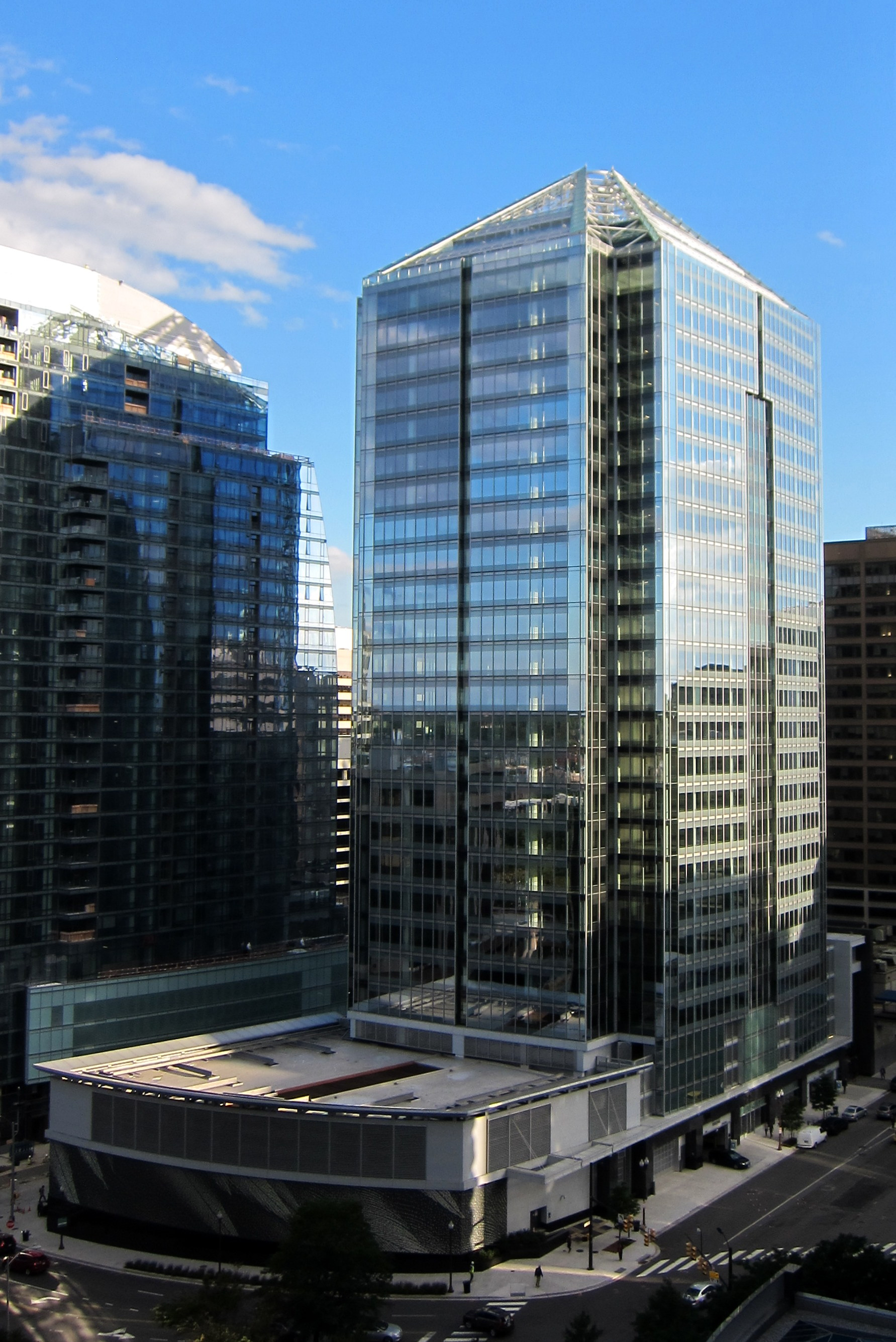
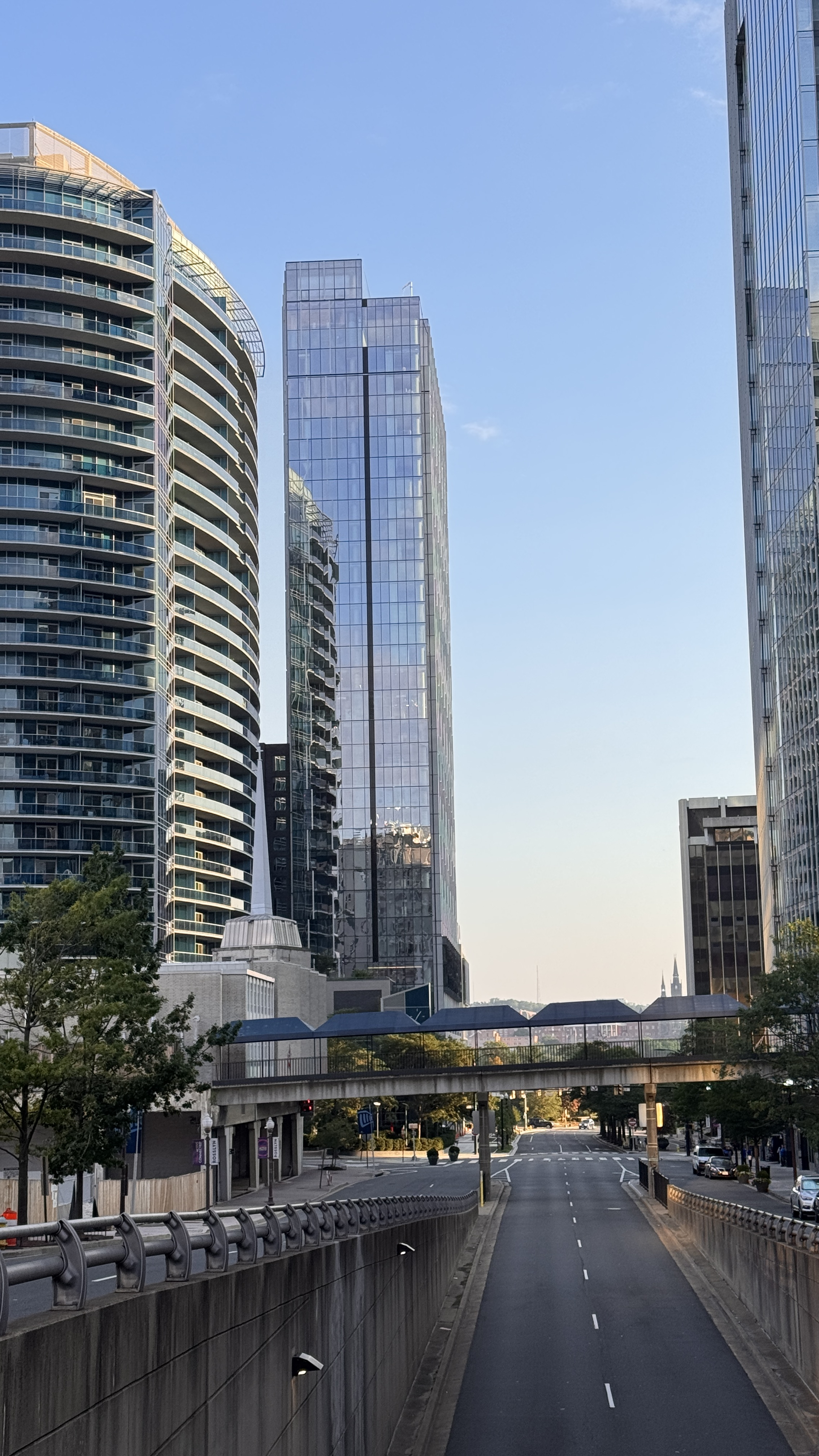
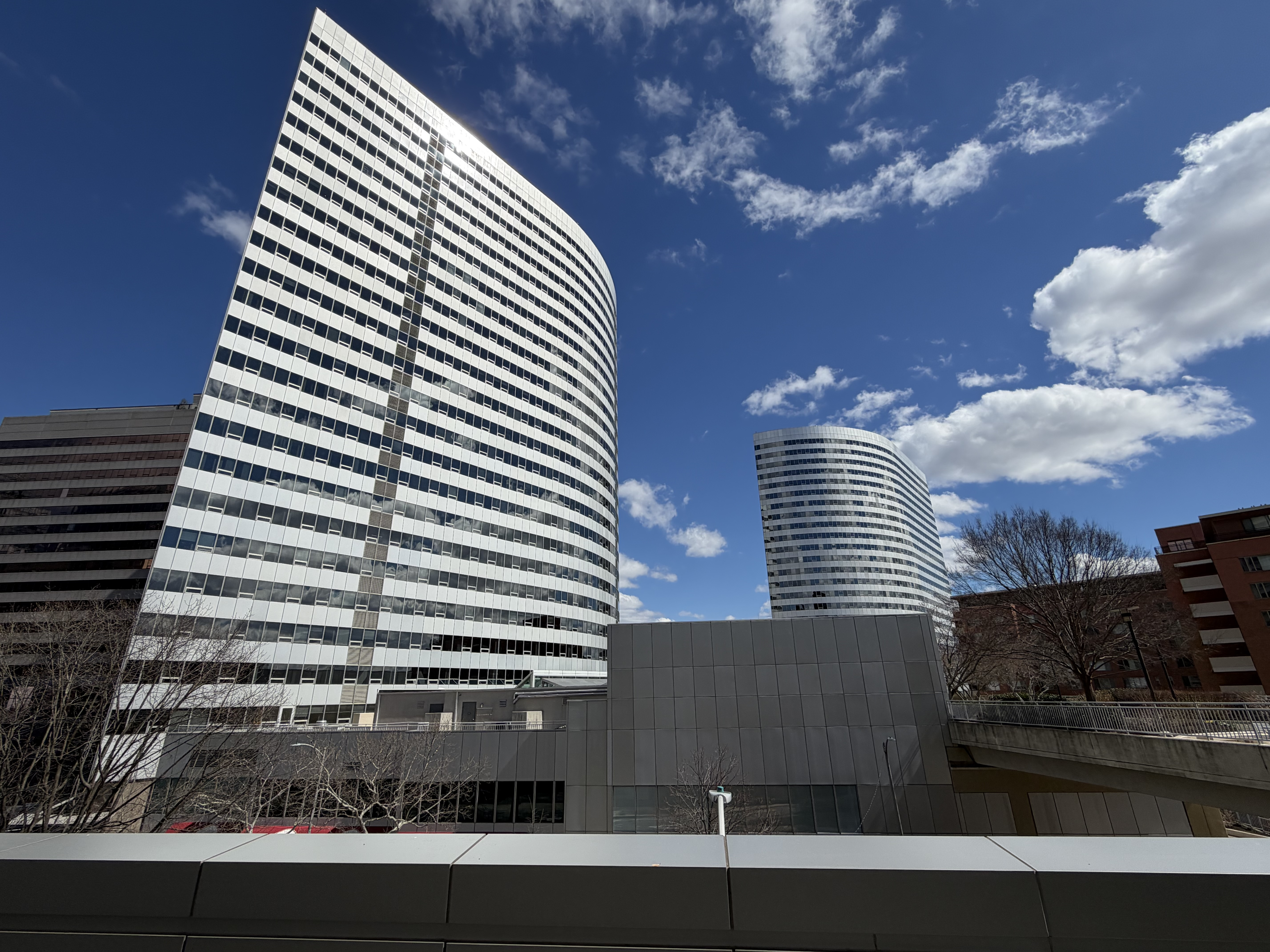
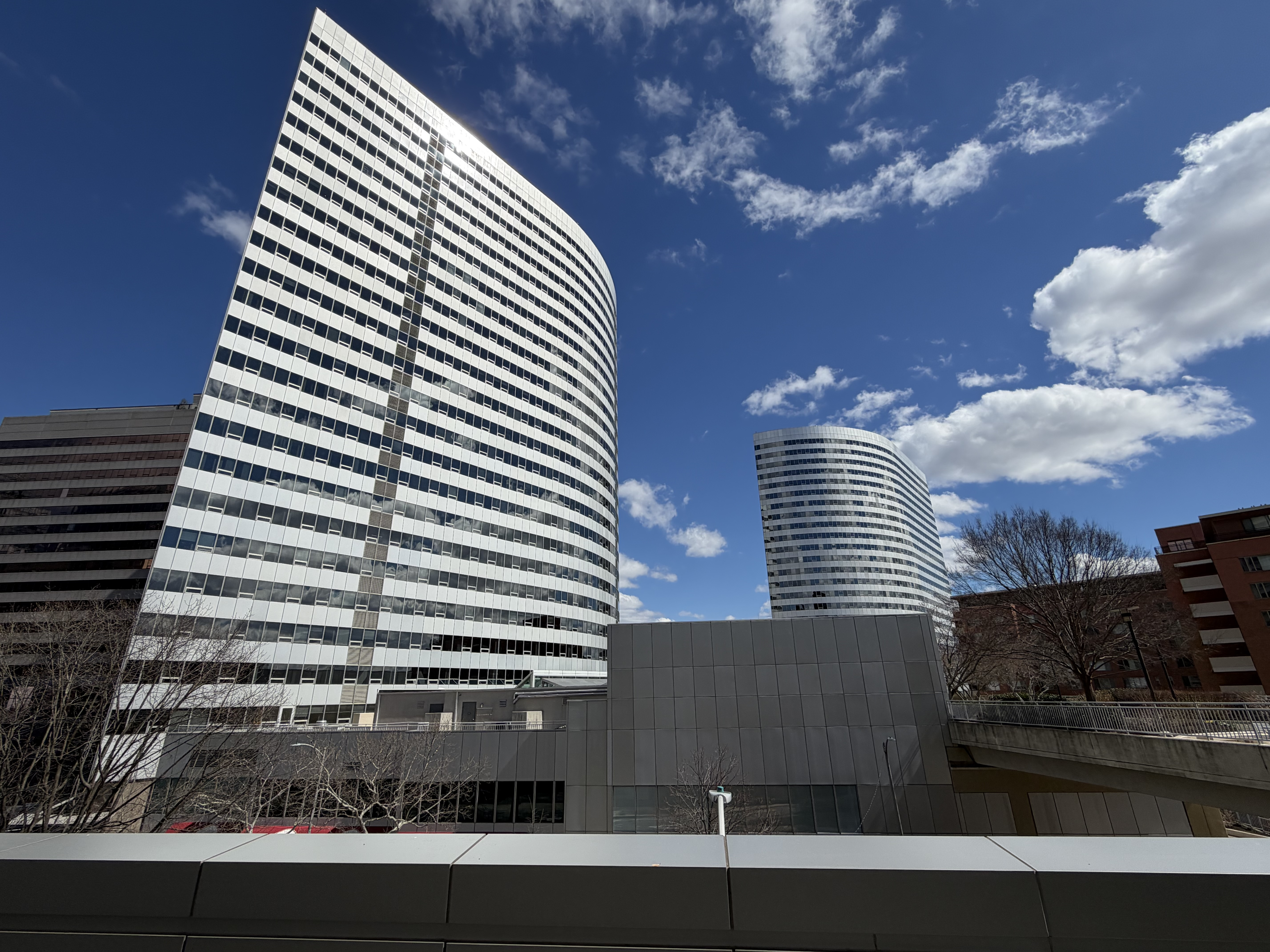
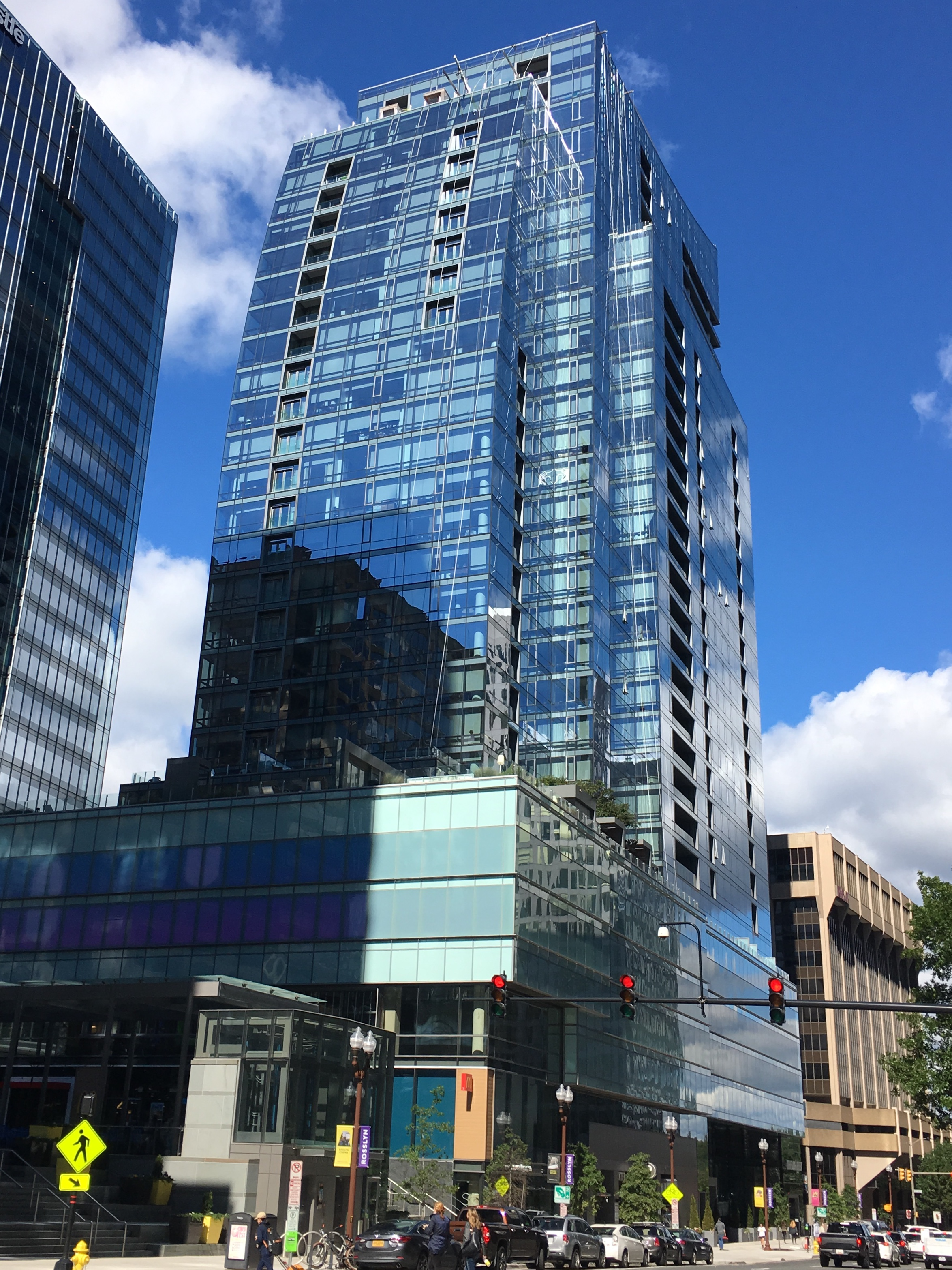
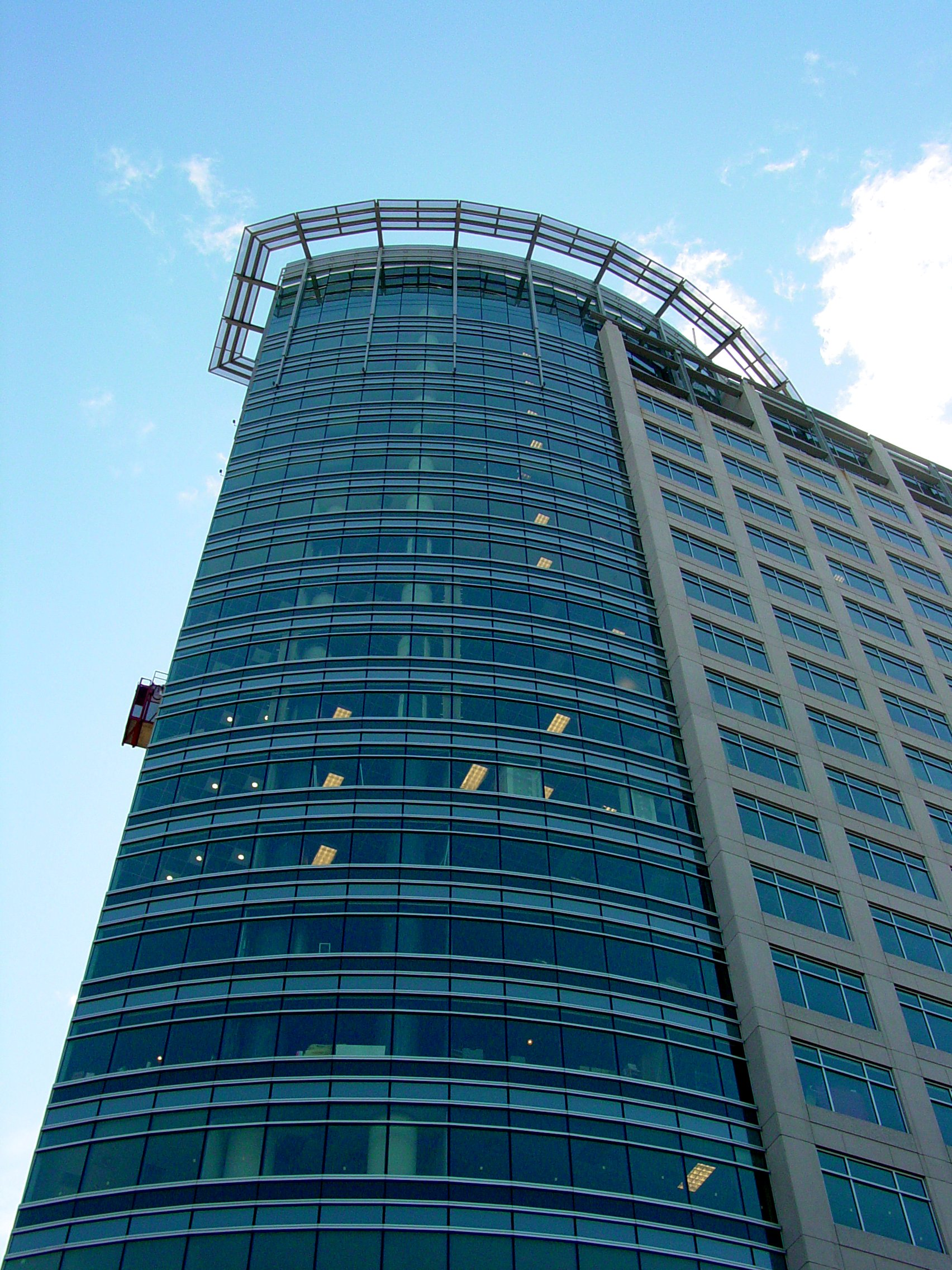
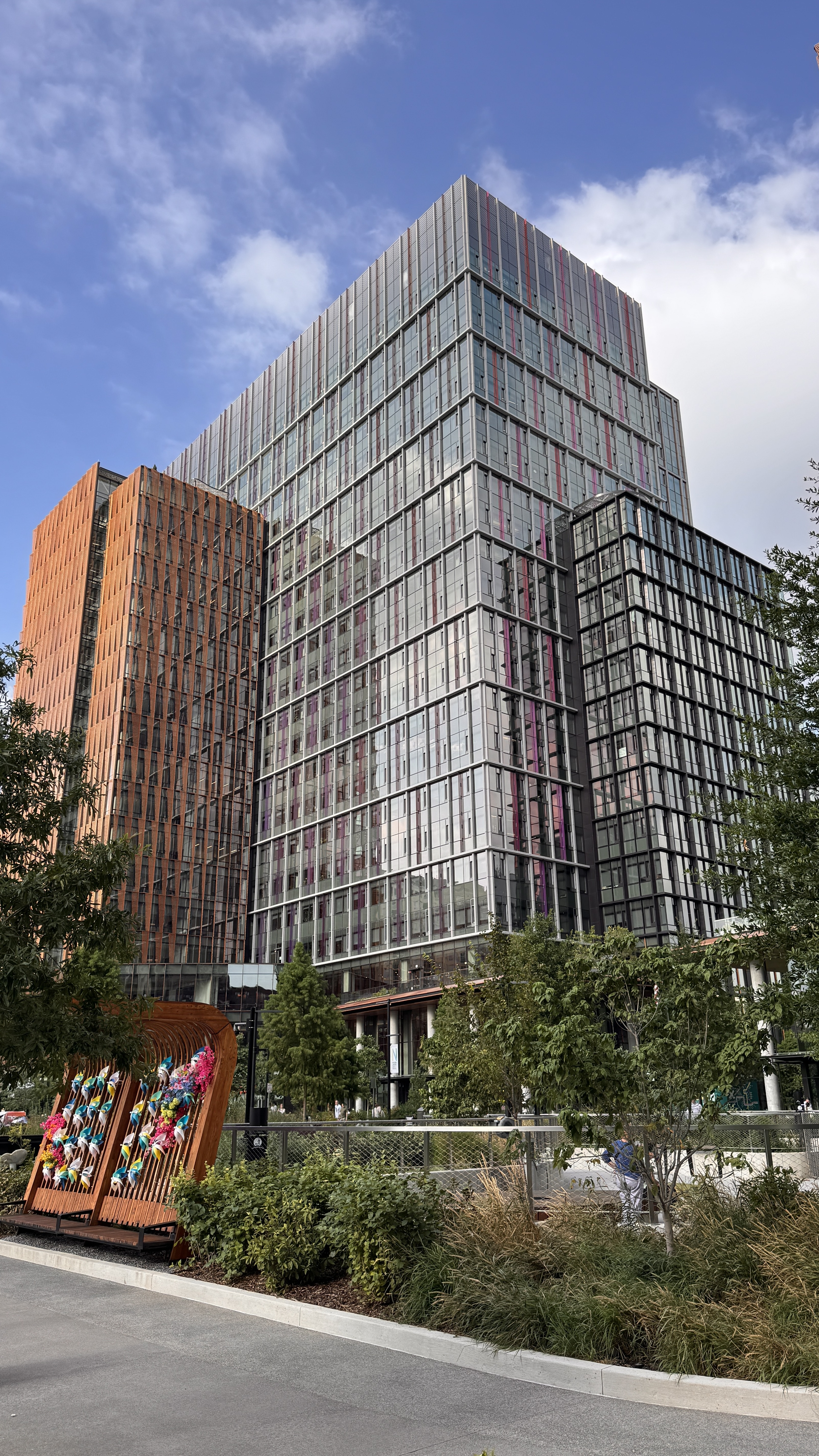
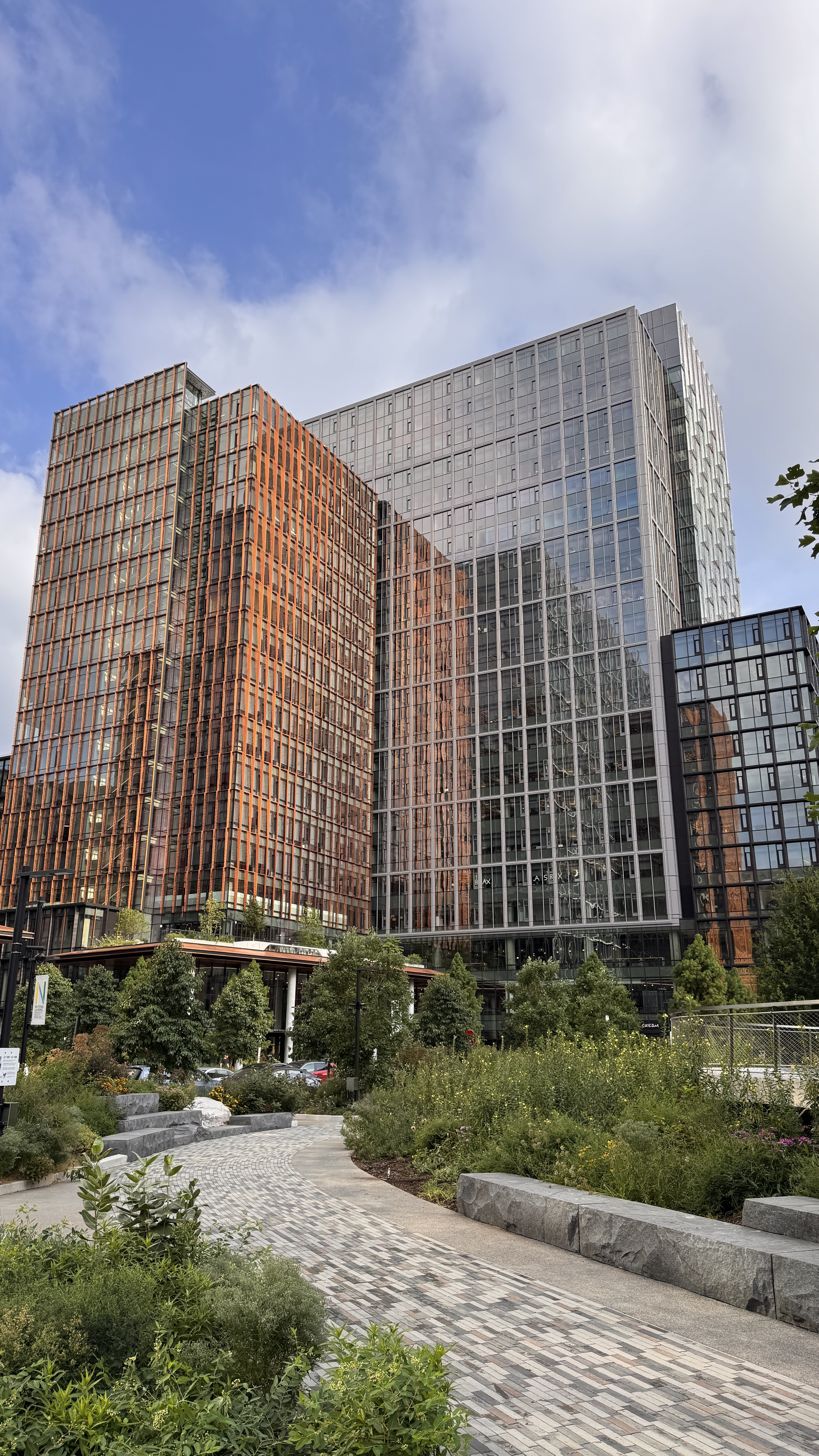
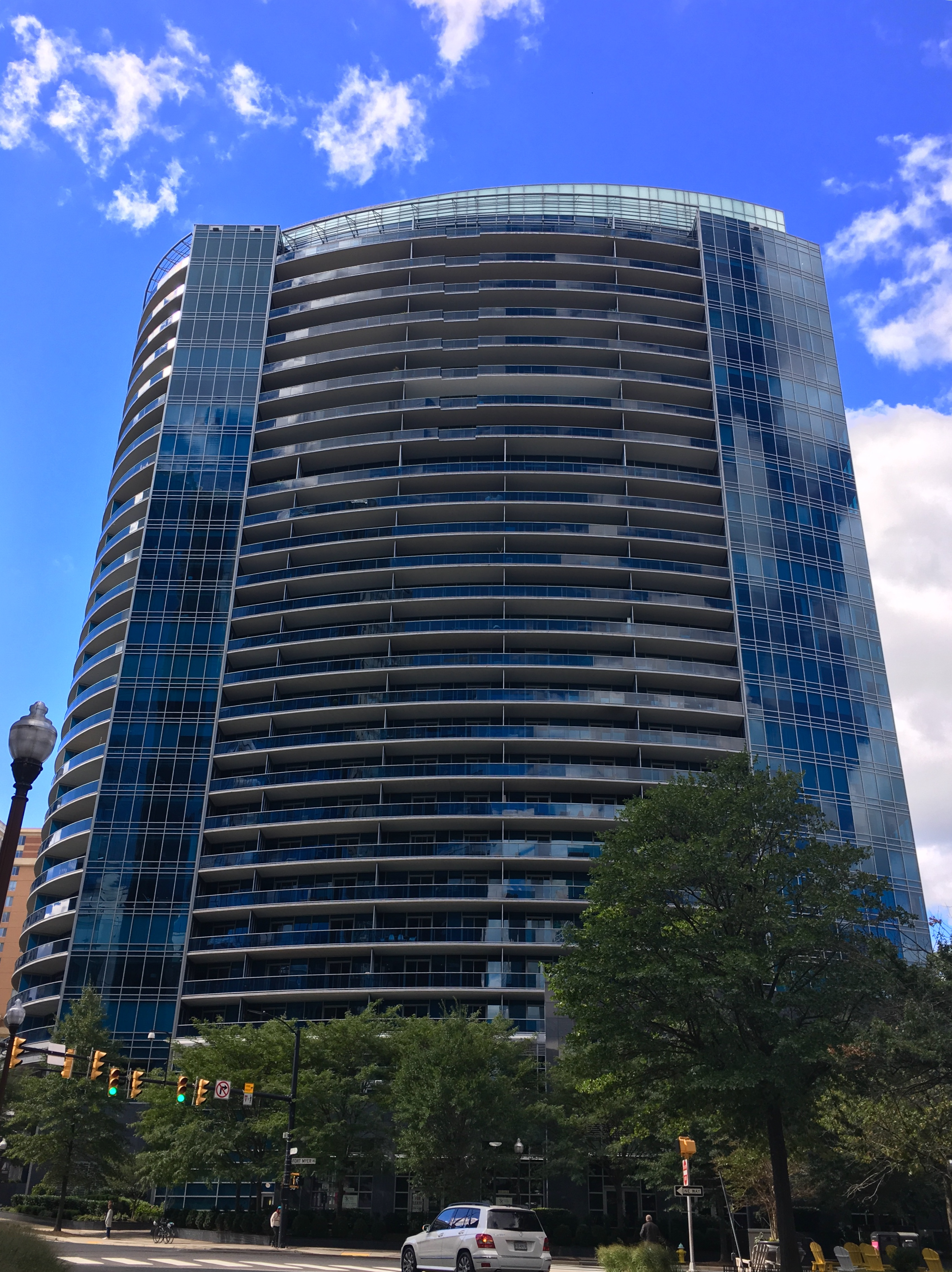
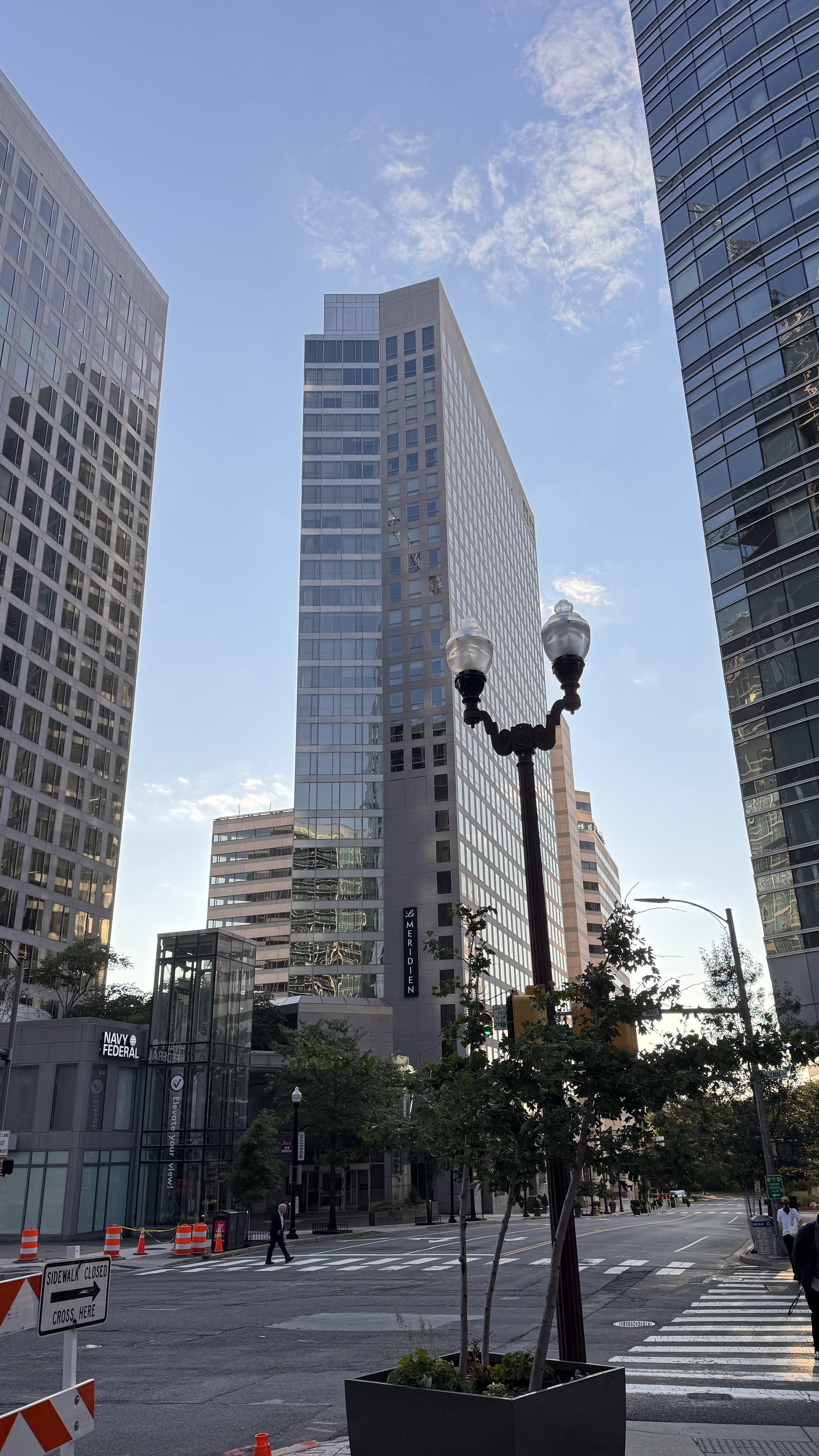
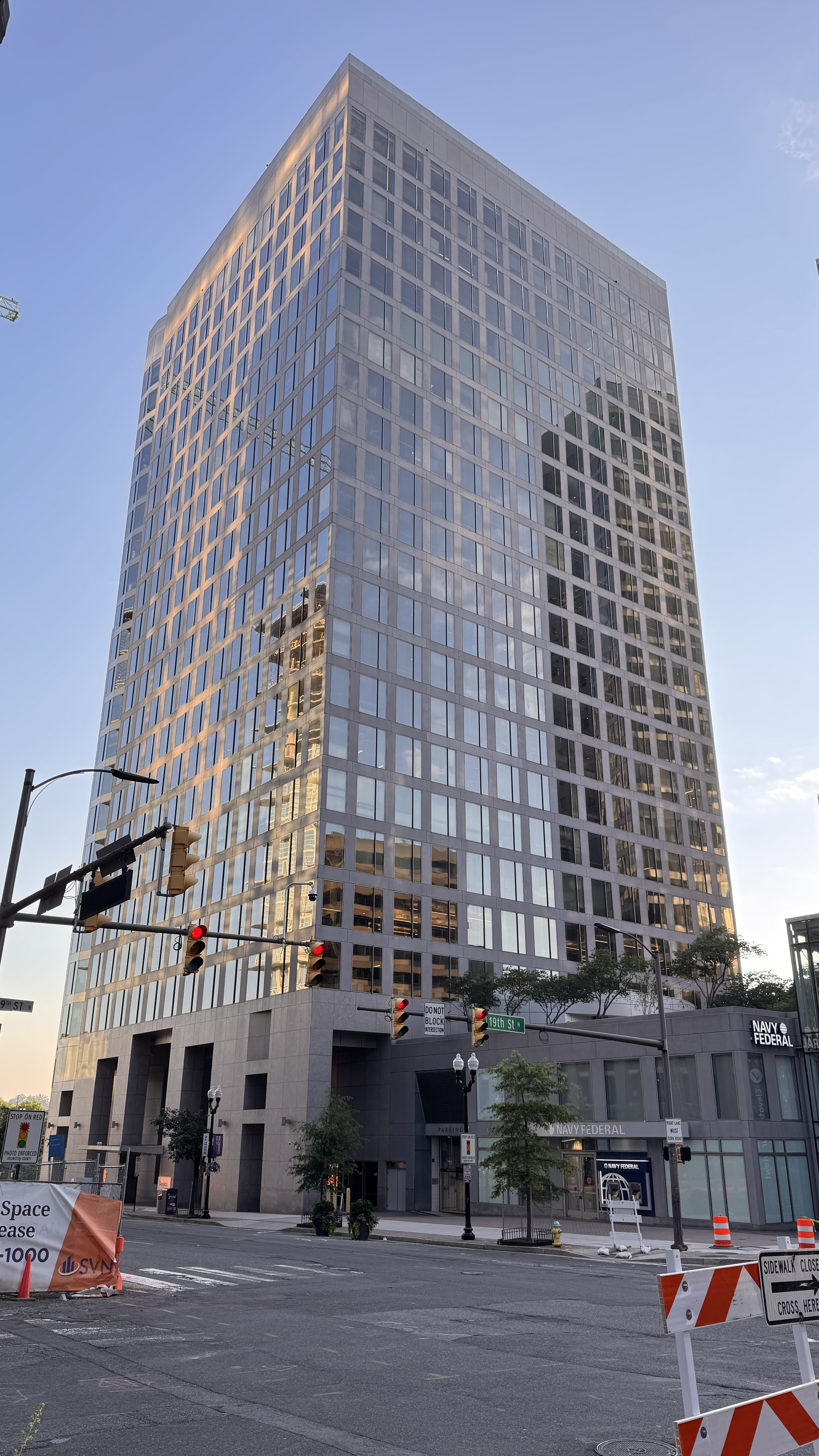
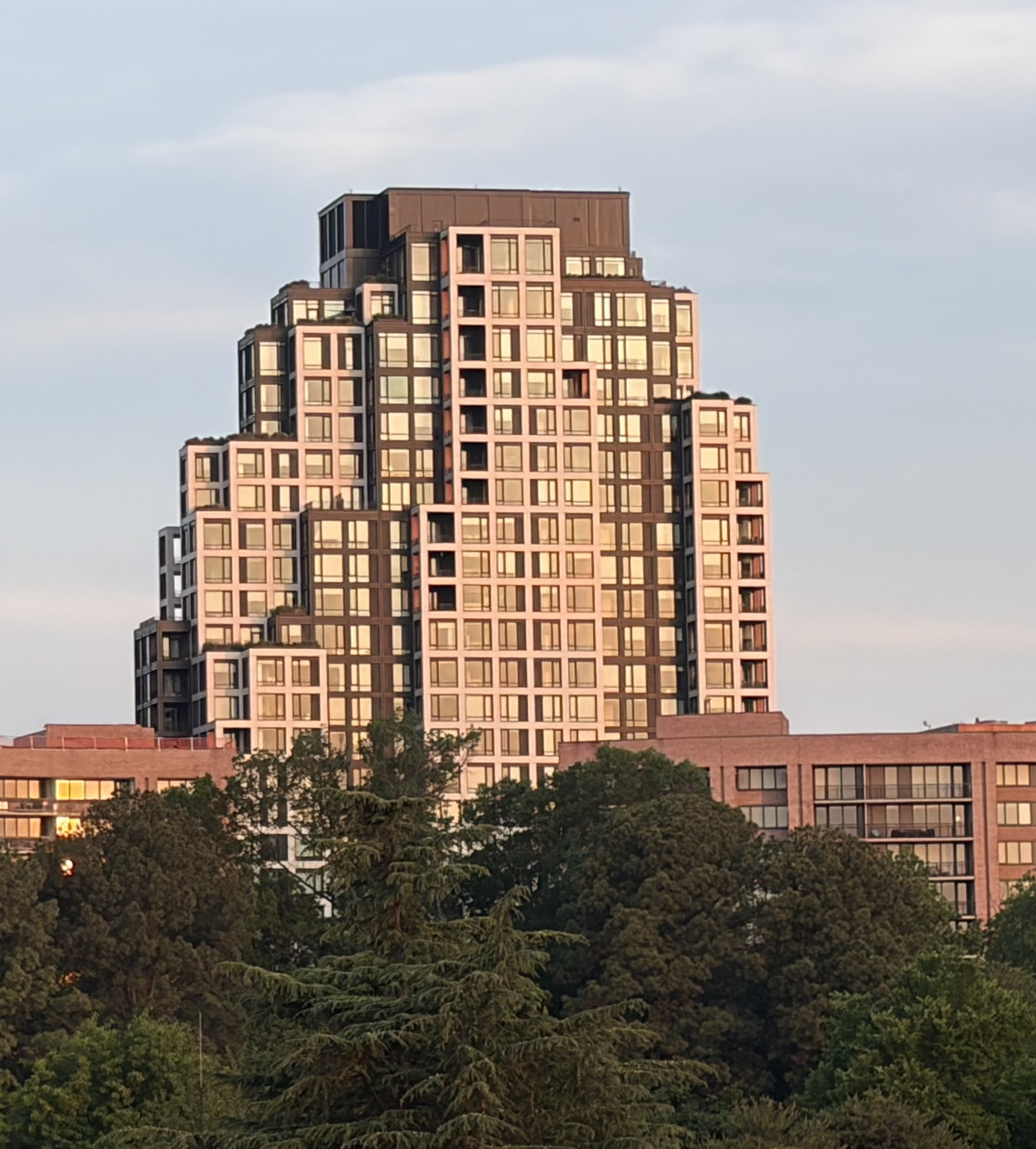
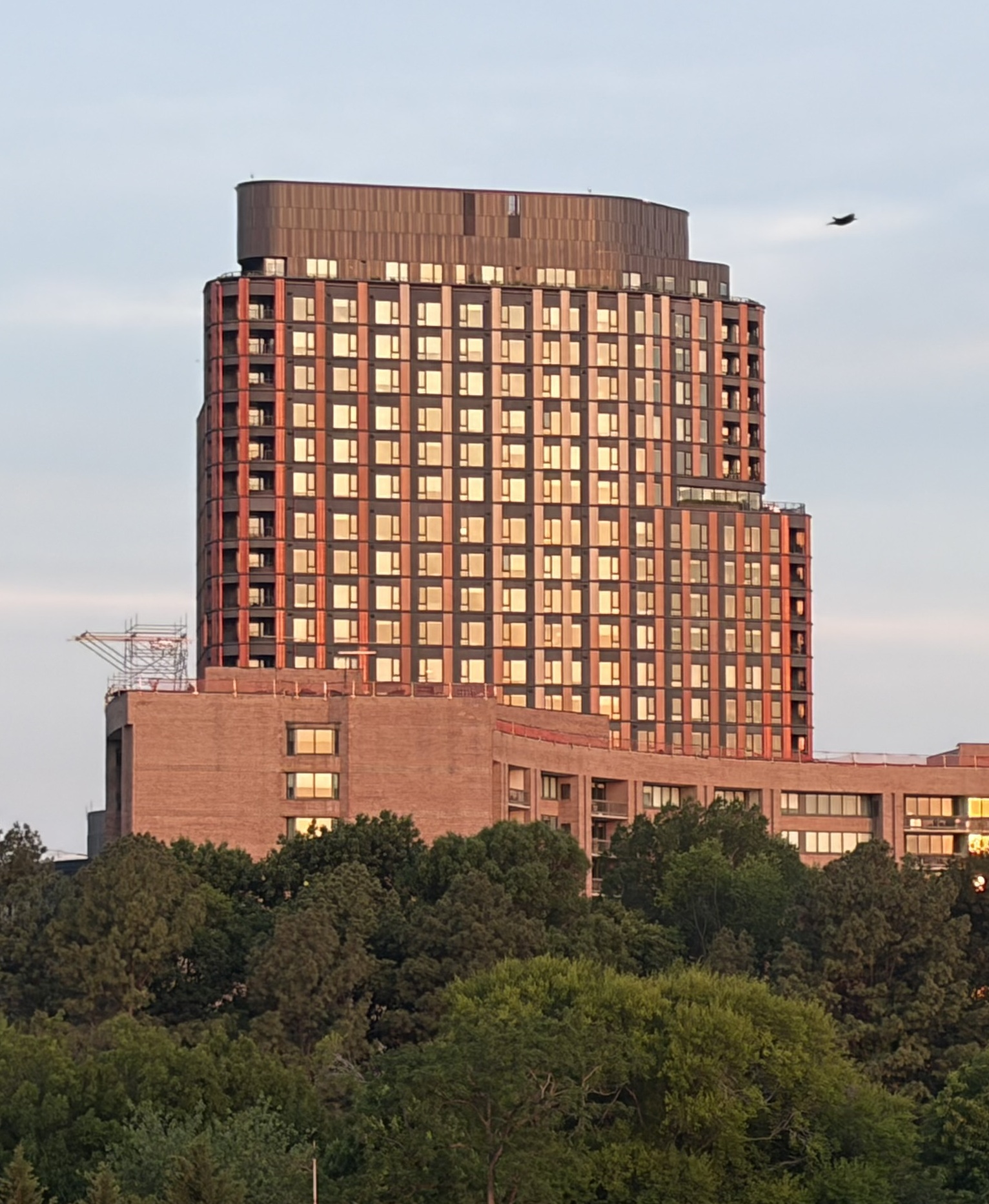
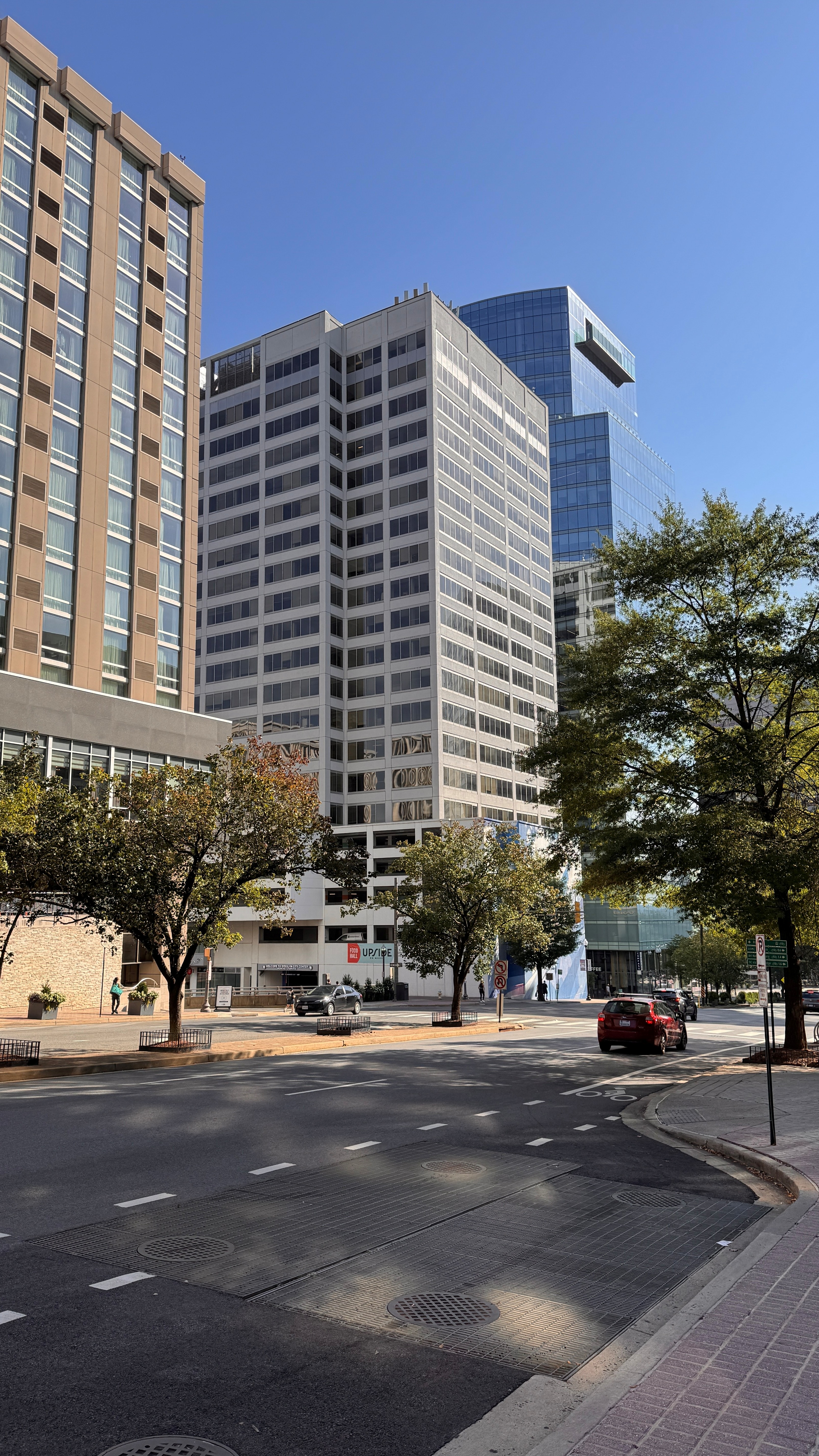
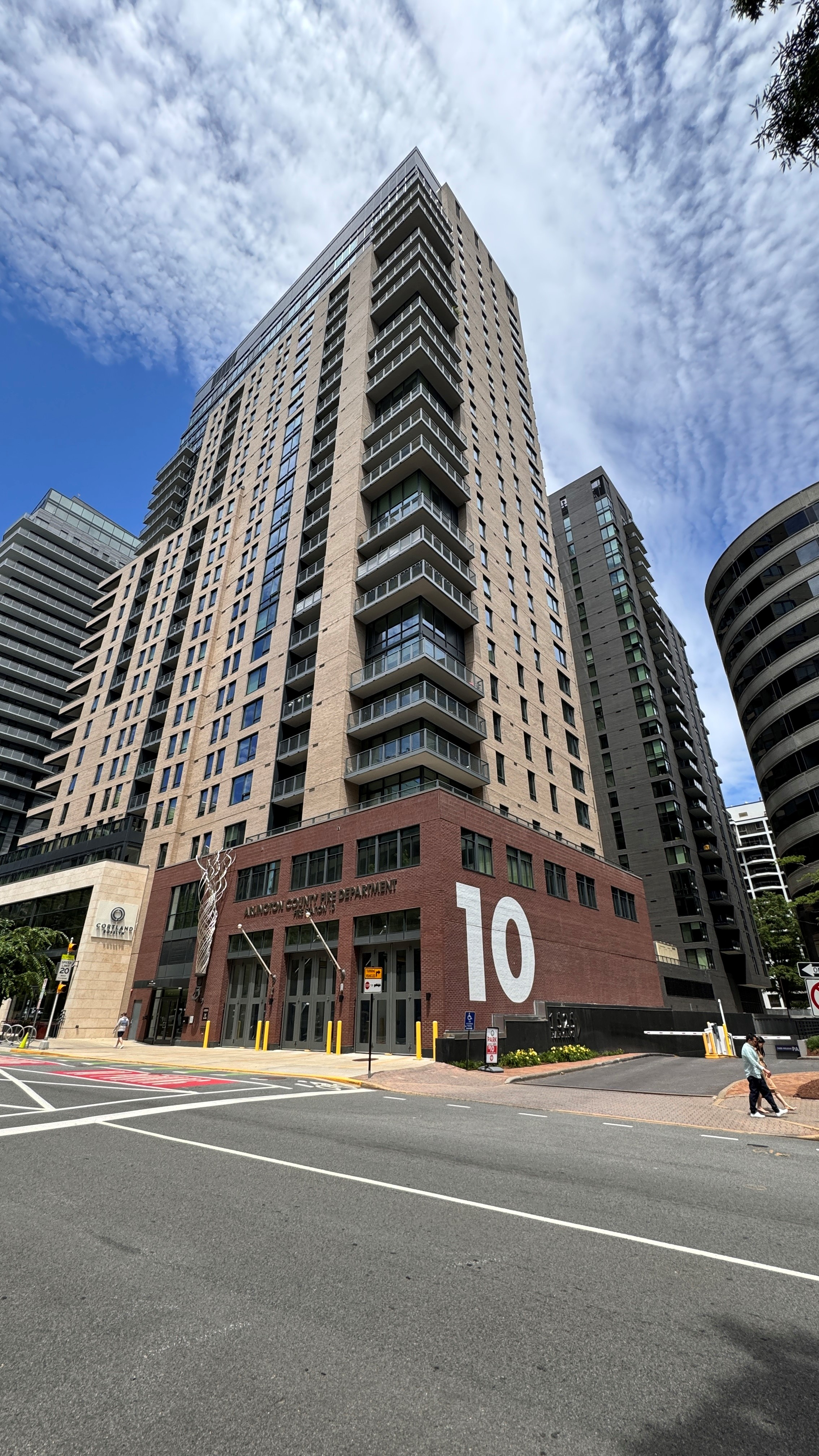
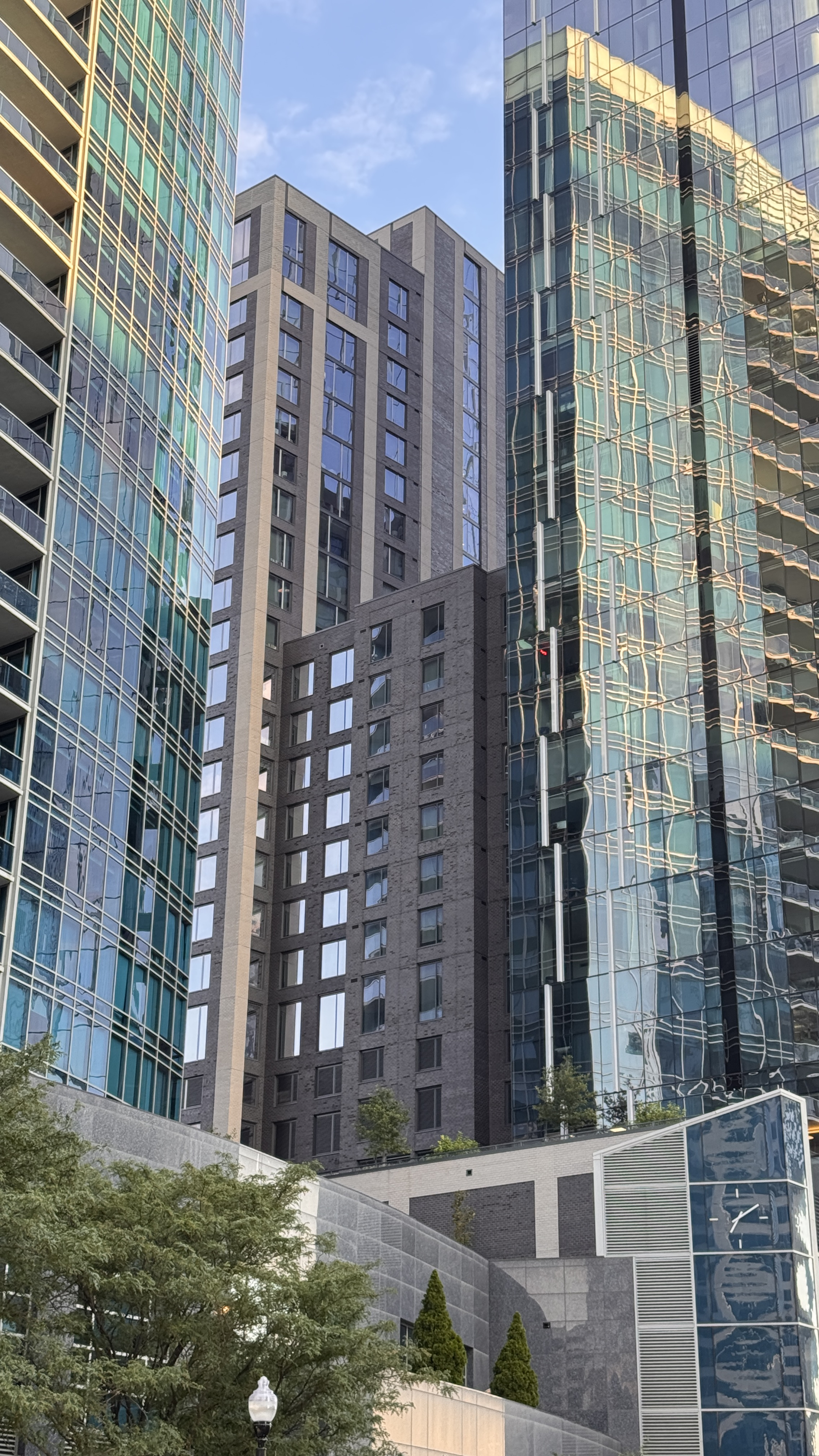
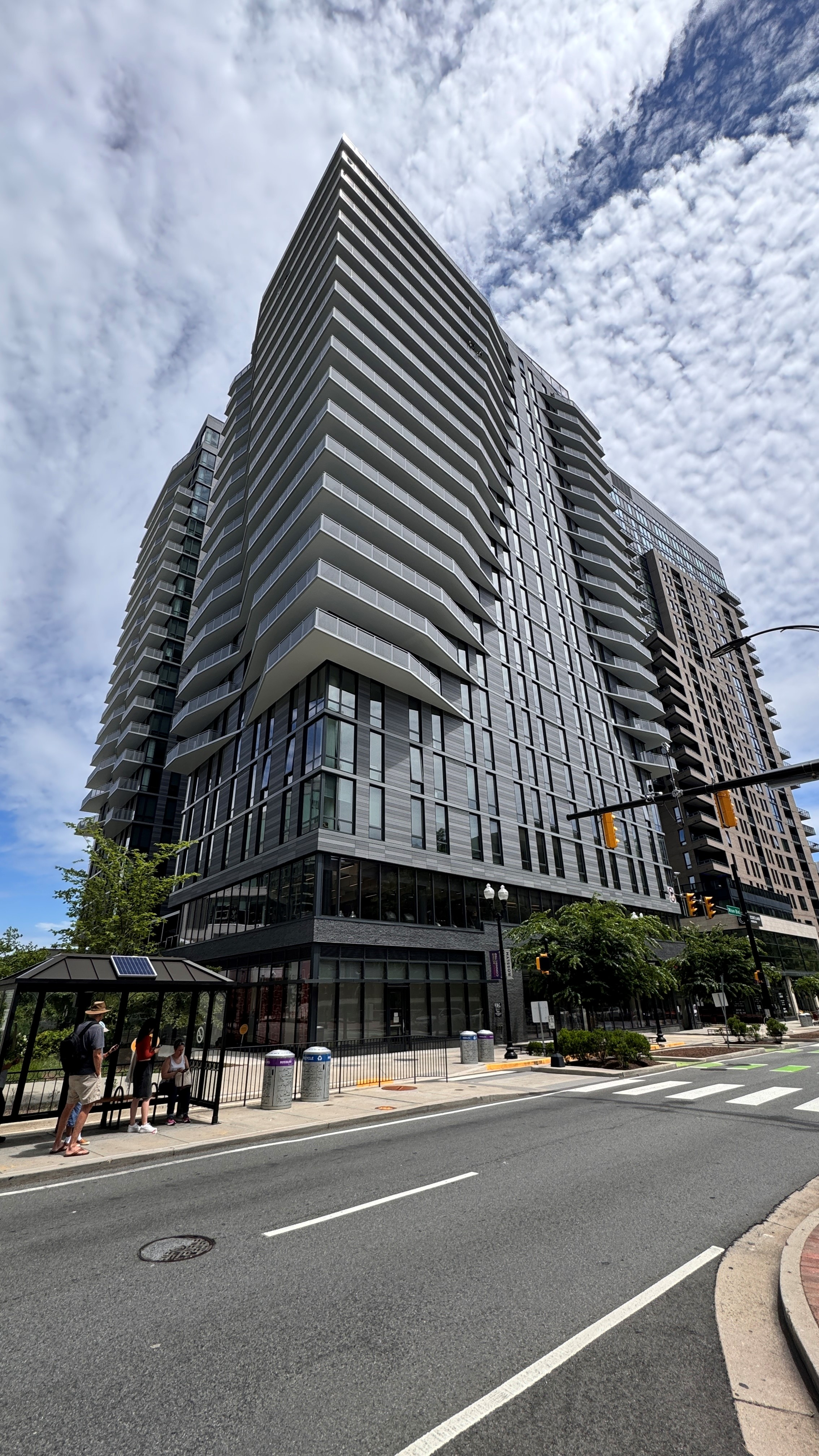
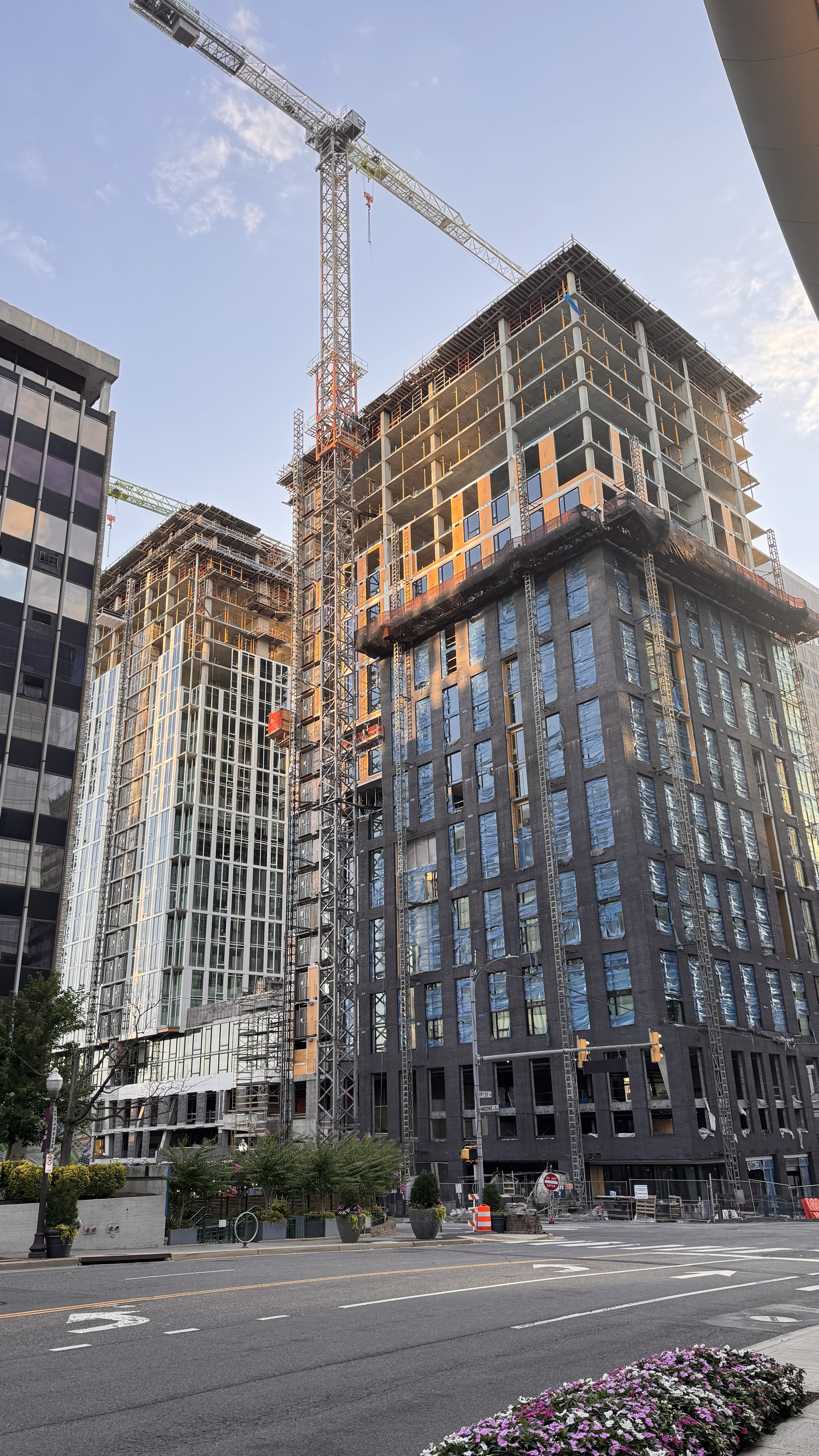
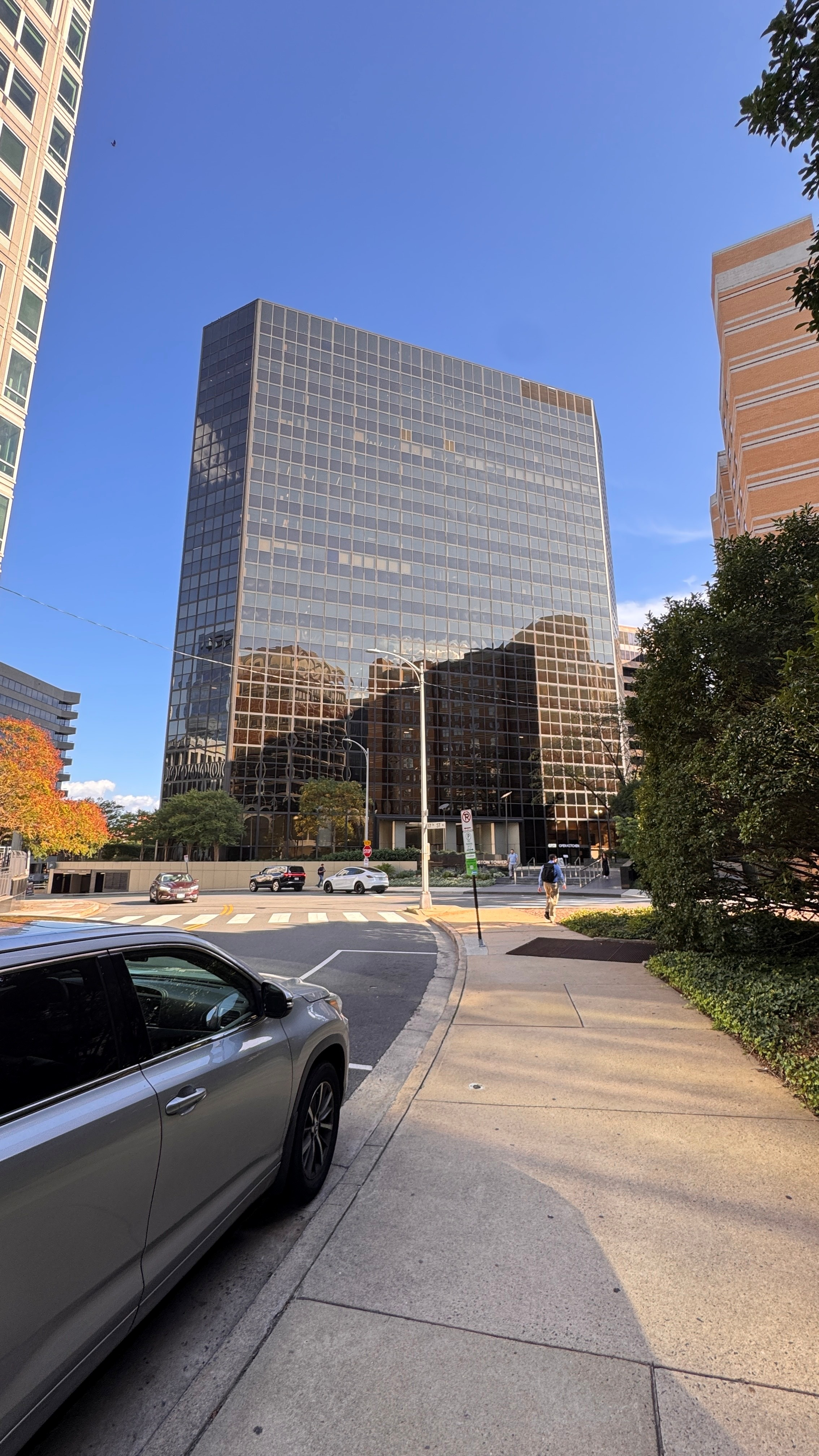
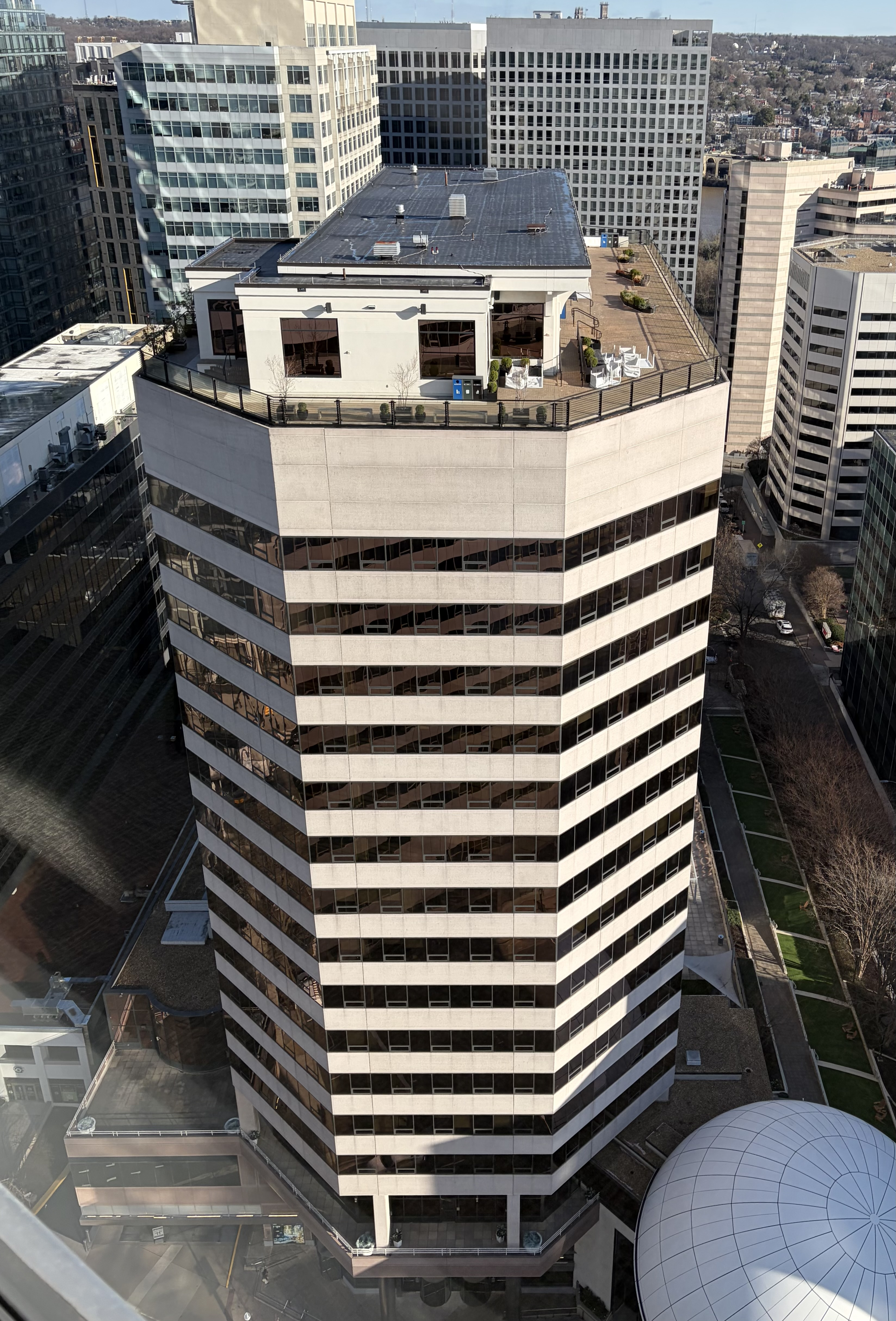
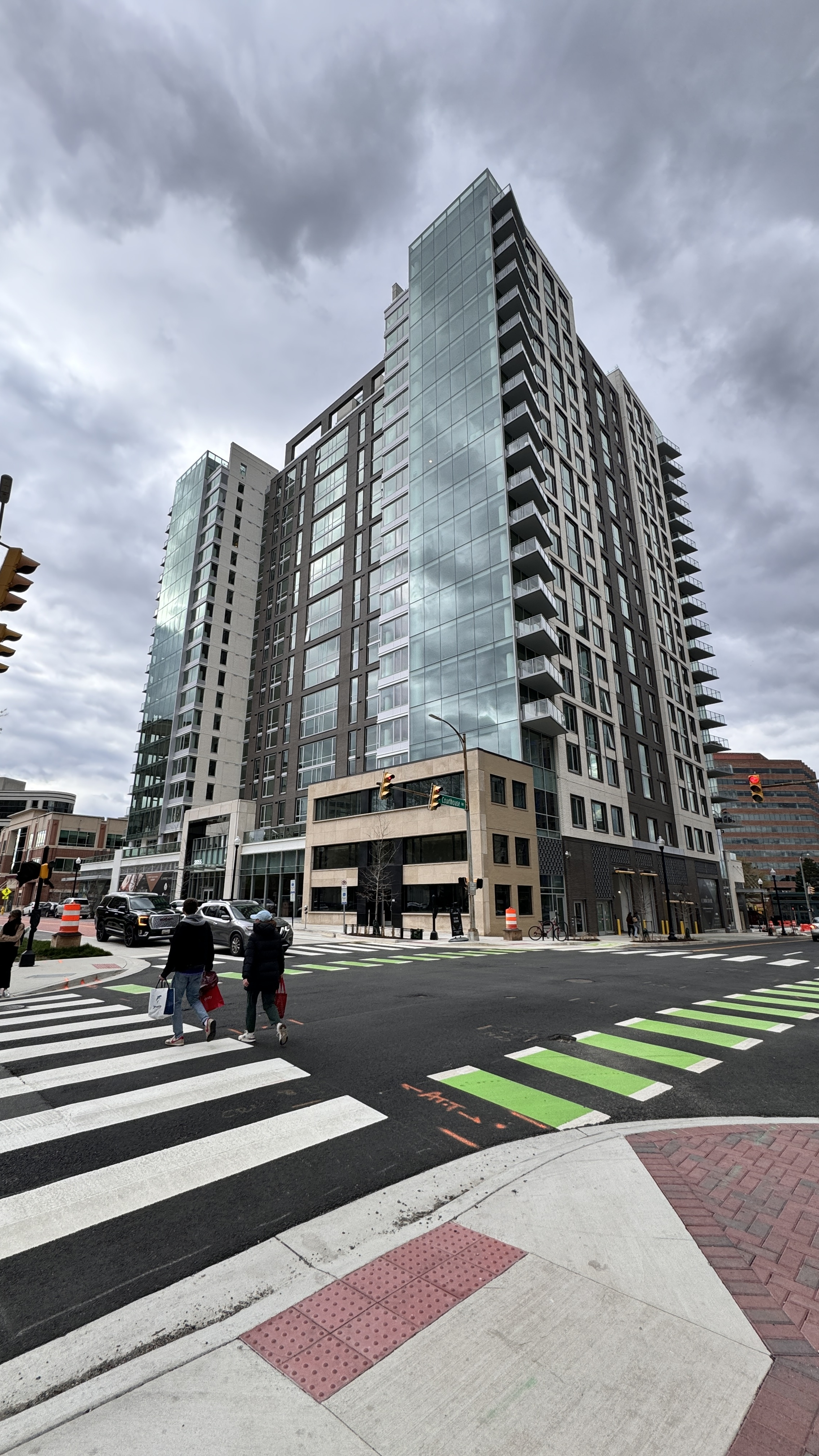
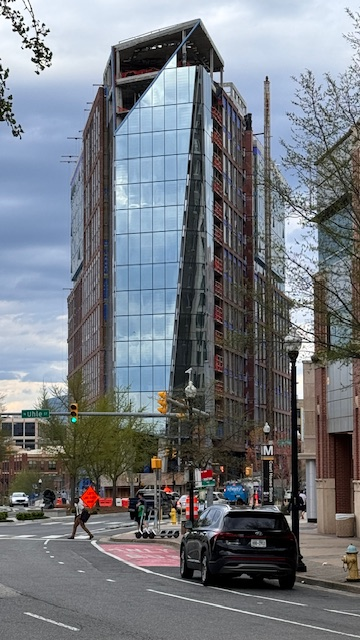
Rank	Name	Picture	Height ft (m)	Floors	Year	Area	Primary Use	Notes
1	Central Place Tower		391 feet (119 m)	32	2017	Rosslyn	Office	Tallest buildings in Arlington since 2017. The View of DC provides access to the top two floors, with a publicly accessible vantage point that opened June 21, 2018.
2	1812 North Moore Street		390 (119)	35	2013	Rosslyn	Office	Was the tallest building in the Washington metropolitan area at the time of completion, overtaking the Rosslyn Twin Towers. Was surpassed by the Capital One Tower in 2017.
3	Hilton at The Key		385 feet (117 m)	36	2025	Rosslyn	Hotel	Part of The Key. Full service hotel with 331 rooms, 28,000 SF of conference space, and retail.
4	Rosslyn Twin Tower One		381 (116)	31	1980	Rosslyn	Office
5	Rosslyn Twin Tower Two		381 (116)	31	1982	Rosslyn	Office
6	Central Place Residential Tower		355 (108)	31	2016	Rosslyn	Residential	Tallest residential building in Arlington.
7	1801 North Lynn Street		344 (105)	24	2002	Rosslyn	Office
8	Metropolitan Park Jasper		327 (100)	22	2023	Pentagon City	Office	Part of Amazon's HQ2, (north building)
9	Metropolitan Park Merlin		327 (100)	22	2023	Pentagon City	Office	Part of Amazon's HQ2 (south building)
10	Turnberry Tower		313 (95)	26	2009	Rosslyn	Residential	Condo tower with 248 units
11	Two Waterview Place		300 (91)	30	2007	Rosslyn	Residential/Hotel	Also called Le Meridien Arlington, containing hotel and residences.
12	One Waterview Place		300 (91)	24	2008	Rosslyn	Office
13	The Grace		300 (91)	26	2024	Crystal City	Residential	337 units and 21,800 SF of retail
14	Reva		300 (91)	27	2024	Crystal City	Residential	471 units and 16,800 SF of retail
15	Rosslyn Metro Center II		298 (91)	22	2002	Rosslyn	Office
16	Evo at The Highlands		293 (89)	27	2021	Rosslyn	Residential	Also known by its working name "Cortland Rosslyn East".
17	Rosslyn Towers at The Key		290 feet (88 m)	28	2024	Rosslyn	Residential	Part of The Key. Luxury apartments will contain 500+ units, 28,000 SF of conference space, and retail.
18	Valen	Upload image	290 feet (88 m)	25	2025	Crystal City	Residential	Also called Crystal Plaza West. 365 units and 18,510 SF of retail.
19	4040 Wilson Boulevard	Upload image	278 (85)	31	2016	Ballston	Residential	Was the tallest residential building outside of Rosslyn before 2024.
20	The Whitmer	Upload image	270 (82)	25	2019	Pentagon City	Residential
21	4000 North Fairfax	Upload image	267 (81)	22	2020	Ballston	Residential
22	Aubrey at The Highlands		263 (80)	23	2021	Rosslyn	Apartments	Also known by its working name "Cortland Rosslyn West".
23	The Bartlett at Metropolitan Park	Upload image	261 (80)	22	2016	Pentagon City	Residential
24	J Rivelle		260 feet (79 m)	27	2026	Rosslyn	Residential	Former RCA site. Luxury apartments with 442 units and 12,130 SF of retail. Joined at the base and at the top by an "amenity bridge"
25	Arlington Tower		250 (76)	19	1980	Rosslyn	Office
26	Hilton Arlington & Towers	Upload image	246 (75)	26	1980	Ballston	Hotel	Contains a Hilton Hotel with the Alta Vista (condos) on the top floors.
27	Ballston Place	Upload image	244 (74)	24	2001	Ballston	Residential
28	1101 Wilson Boulevard		230 (70)	24	1989	Rosslyn	Office
29	The Zoe	Upload image	224 feet (68 m)	19	2024	Crystal City	Residential	Also called Crystal Plaza East. 421 units and 11,060 SF of retail.
30	Bella Vista	Upload image	223 (68)	21	1988	Crystal City	Residential
31	The Commodore		220 (67)	20	2023	Courthouse	Residential	Tallest building in Courthouse
32	Residences at Liberty Center	Upload image	219 (67)	21	2008	Ballston	Residential
33	Crystal Plaza II	Upload image	218 (66)	20	2009	Crystal City	Residential
34	AVA Ballston Square I	Upload image	217 (66)	22	1992	Ballston	Residential	Formerly Lincoln Towers at Ballston I, has since been renovated and renamed.
35	AVA Ballston Square II	Upload image	217 (66)	22	1992	Ballston	Residential	Formerly Lincoln Towers at Ballston II, has since been renovated and renamed.
36	Meridian at Ballston Commons	Upload image	217 (66)	21	1997	Ballston	Residential
37	The Continental at Ballston	Upload image	217 (66)	21	2003	Ballston	Residential
38	Quincy Plaza	Upload image	215 (66)	21	2006	Ballston	Residential
39	Three Ballston Plaza	Upload image	200 feet (61 m)	16	1990	Ballston	Office	Part of the Ballston Plaza development.
40	The Wendy		200 feet (61 m)	16	2025	Courthouse	Residential	421 units and 11,060 SF of retail.

== Tallest buildings: Site Prep or Under Construction ==
There are currently no buildings under construction in Arlington that are expected to rise to a height of at least 200 ft (61 m).

== Tallest buildings: Approved or Proposed ==
Name	Height ft (m)	Floors	Status	Area	Use	Notes
The Helix	354 (108)	15	Approved	Pentagon City	Amenity	Part of Amazon HQ2 Phase 2. Utility work is currently underway.
PenPlace I	327 (100)	22	Approved	Pentagon City	Office	Part of Amazon HQ2 Phase 2. Utility work is currently underway.
PenPlace II	327 (100)	22	Approved	Pentagon City	Office	Part of Amazon HQ2 Phase 2. Utility work is currently underway.
PenPlace III	327 (100)	22	Approved	Pentagon City	Office	Part of Amazon HQ2 Phase 2. Utility work is currently underway.
One Rosslyn South	325 (99)	30	Approved	Rosslyn	Residential	South tower of the One Rosslyn development. 461 rental units and ground level retail.
Ames Center South	320 (98)	31	Approved	Rosslyn	Residential	424 units.
Ames Center North	310 (94)	30	Approved	Rosslyn	Residential	364 units. Existing church and gas station will be incorporated into the base.
Key Tower	300 (91)	27	Approved	Rosslyn	Residential	Phase I of the Key Boulevard redevelopment. 325 units with grocery store on street-level.
Wilson Tower	300 (91)	27	Approved	Rosslyn	Office	Phase II of the Key Boulevard redevelopment. 500 units and 12,000 SF of retail.
Building F	296 (90)	27	Proposed	Pentagon City	Hotel/Residential	Part of proposed redevelopment of Pentagon Centre.
Building B1 Phase II	295 (90)	21	Proposed	Pentagon City	Office	Part of proposed redevelopment of Pentagon Centre.
One Rosslyn Northeast	293 (89)	23	Approved	Rosslyn	Residential	Northeast tower of the One Rosslyn development. 73 condo units and ground level retail.
New Century Center	290 (88)	25	Proposed	Crystal City	Residential	329 units and 7,625 SF of retail.
Xerox Building	290 (88)	31	Proposed	Rosslyn	Residential	On hold as of March 2025. 691 units and 11,355 SF of retail.
Building E	289 (88)	20	Proposed	Pentagon City	Office	Part of proposed redevelopment of Pentagon Centre.
One Rosslyn Northwest	285 (87)	27	Approved	Rosslyn	Residential	Northwest tower of the One Rosslyn development. 311 rental units and ground level retail.
Building B1 Phase I	276 (84)	25	Proposed	Pentagon City	Residential	Part of proposed redevelopment of Pentagon Centre.
1400 Richmond Highway	225 (69)	25	Approved	Crystal City	Residential	Former Americana Hotel site. 639 units.
Alexan Courthouse	205 (62)	19	Proposed	Courthouse	Residential	Current Arlington Plaza site. 394 units.

== Timeline of tallest buildings ==
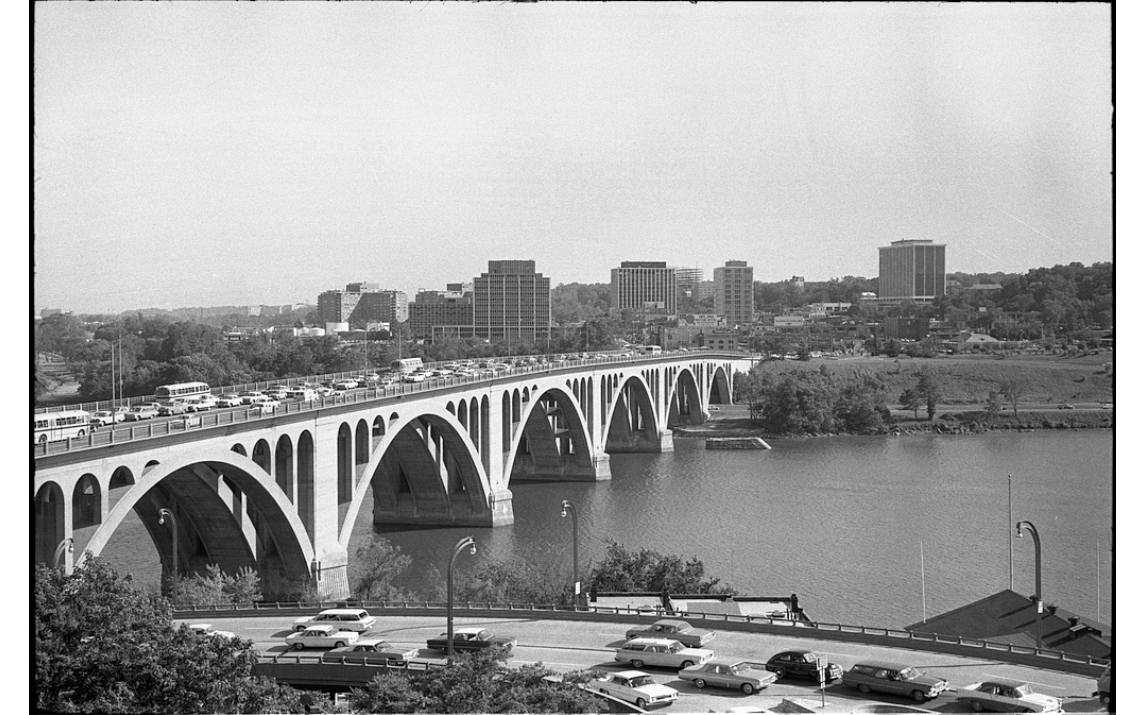
The Rosslyn skyline in 1964

List of buildings that were once the tallest in Arlington.

Name	Image	Years as tallest	Height ft (m)	Floors	Reference
Tower Villas		1972–1980	194 (59)	18	
Rosslyn Twin Tower One		1980–2013	381 (116)	27	
1812 North Moore Street		2013–2017	390 (119)	35	
Central Place Tower		2017–Present	391 feet (119 m)	32	

== See also ==
- List of tallest buildings in Virginia
- List of tallest buildings in Norfolk
- List of tallest buildings in Richmond
- List of tallest buildings in Tysons, Virginia
- List of tallest buildings in Virginia Beach
