= Central Place =

Office and residential towers in Arlington, Virginia

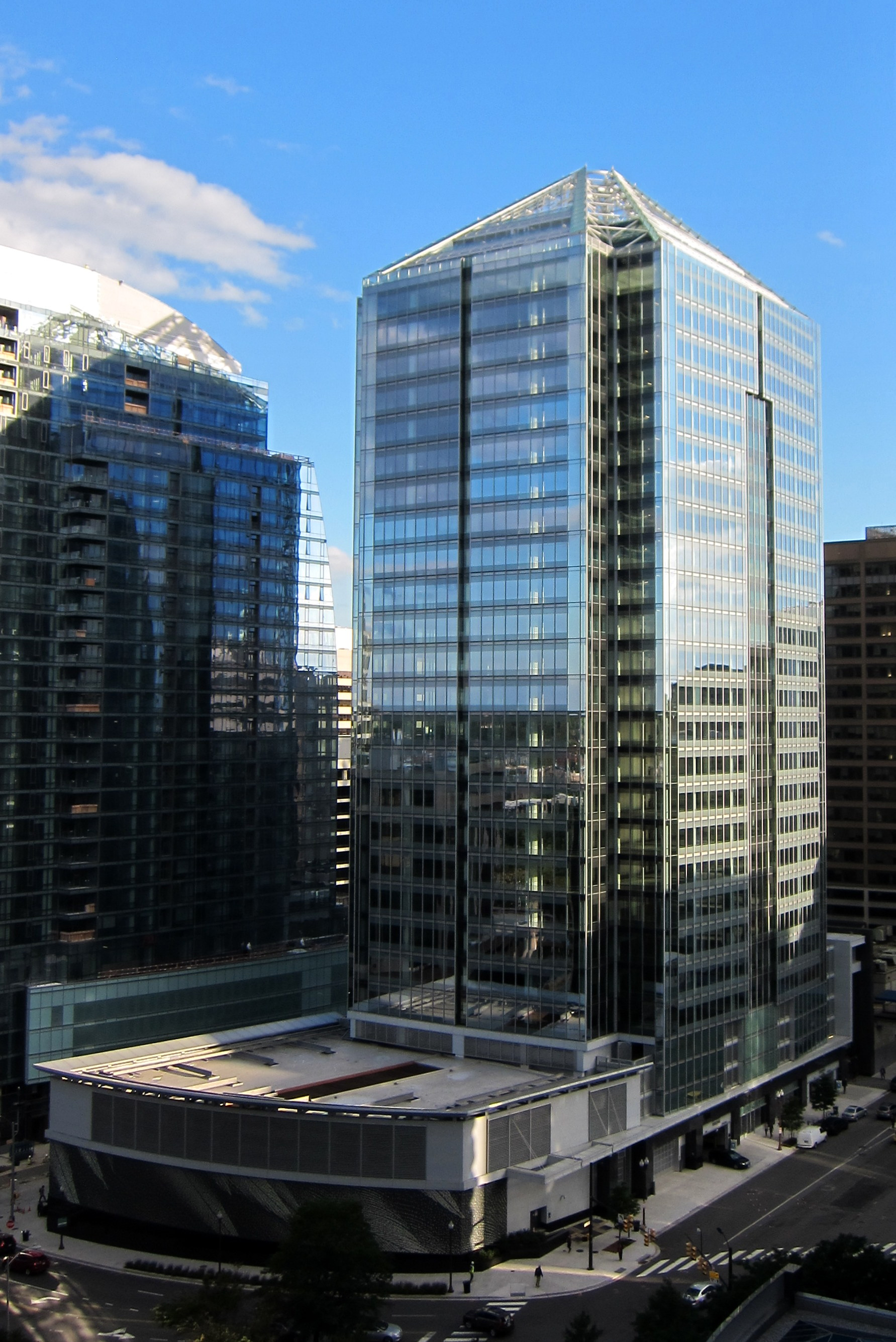
- Central Place residential tower (left) and 1812 N Moore (right)

General information
- Type: Office tower, residential tower, ground floor retail and plaza, observation deck, above ground parking
- Location: Rosslyn, Arlington, Virginia
- Coordinates: 38.896167°N 77.071278°W
- Elevation: ~70–90 ft (21–27 m)
- Completed: 2017 residential tower, 2018 office tower
- Owner: JBG Smith

Height
- Antenna spire: Central Place Tower 391 ft (119 m) Residential Tower 355 ft (108 m)

Technical details
- Floor count: 32 (Central Place Tower) 31 (Residential Tower)
- Floor area: 1,000,000 sq ft (92,900 m^{2})

Design and construction
- Architect: Beyer Blinder Belle
- Main contractor: JBG Smith

Central Place is a mixed-use development in Arlington, Virginia, consisting primarily of Central Place Tower (headquarters of Gartner and CoStar Group) to the south, and a residential tower to the north, with a plaza between them. The office tower is home to Virginia's second public observation deck, after the City Hall of Richmond, Virginia, located nearly 490 ft (149 m) above sea level, and is the highest public location in the Washington metropolitan area.

== History ==
Design began in 2002 and construction was set to begin in 2008, but was delayed to 2014 due to the Great Recession. The complex is located directly above the Rosslyn station of the Washington Metro and some bedrock, presenting engineering challenges.

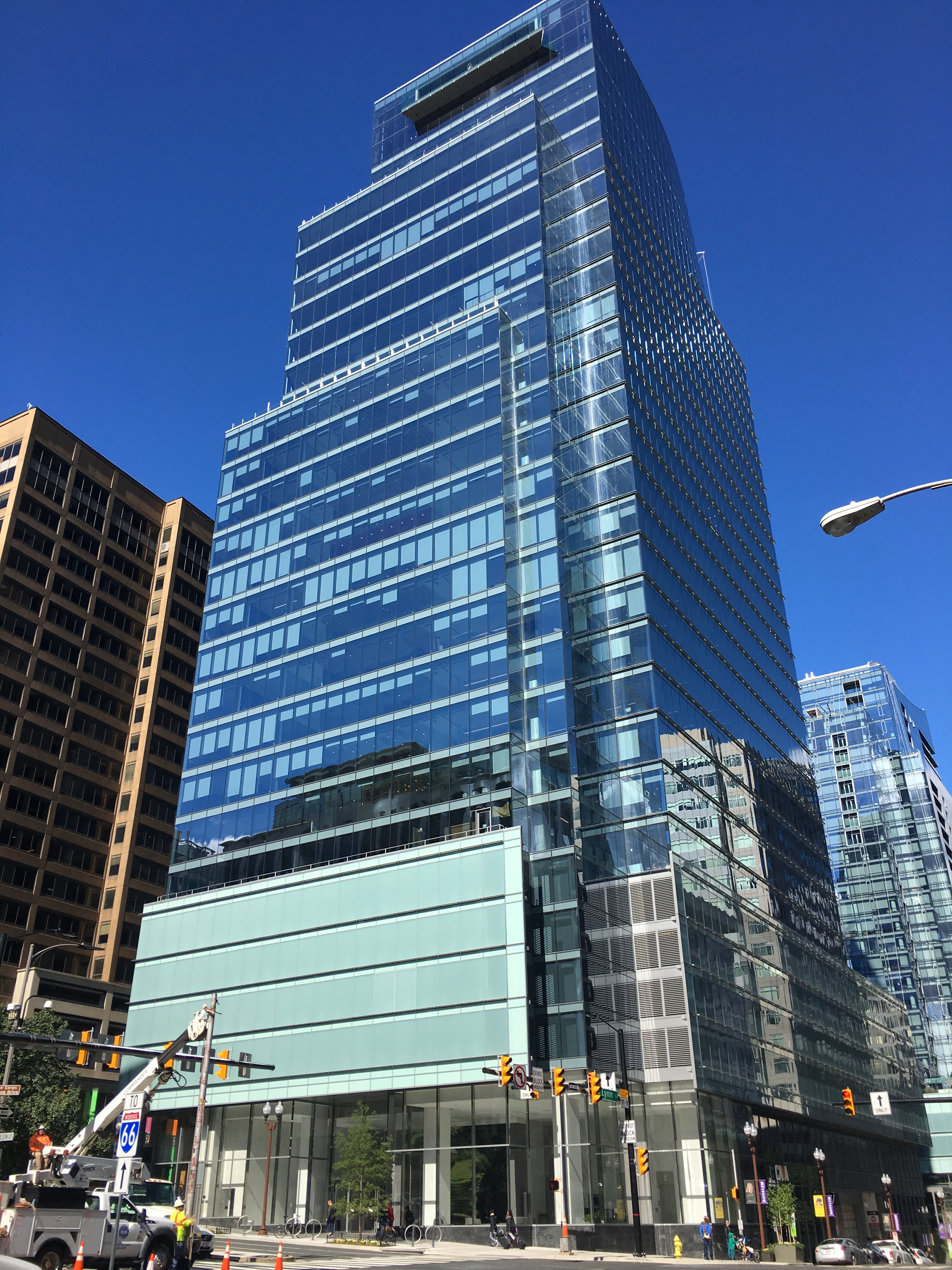
Central Place Tower in the Rosslyn neighborhood of Arlington, Virginia

== See also ==
- List of tallest buildings in Arlington, Virginia
- List of tallest buildings in Virginia
- Sky lobby
