= 1812 N Moore =

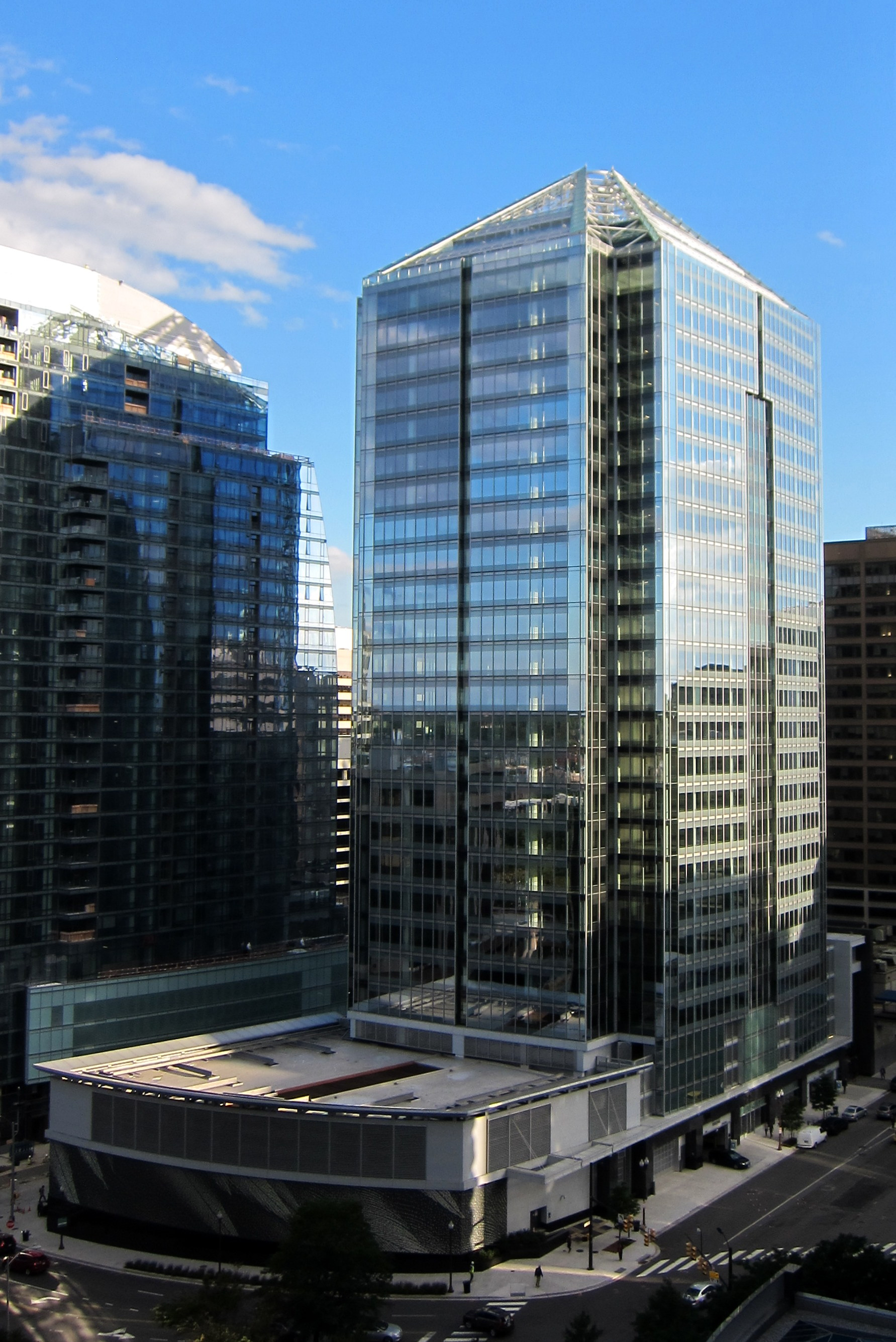
- 1812 N Moore in Arlington County, Virginia
- Interactive map of the 1812 N Moore area

General information
- Status: Completed
- Type: Office
- Location: Rosslyn, Arlington County, Virginia, U.S.
- Coordinates: 38°53′47″N 77°4′19″W
- Elevation: ~80–90 ft (24–27 m)
- Completed: 2013-14

Height
- Antenna spire: 390 ft (119 m)

Technical details
- Floor count: 35
- Floor area: 580,000 sq ft (53,900 m^{2})
- Lifts/elevators: 16

Design and construction
- Architects: Doug Carter, DCS, Ltd.
- Main contractor: Monday Properties
- Designations: LEED Platinum (building), LEED Gold (neighborhood development)

1812 North Moore is an office building in Arlington, Virginia, developed by Monday Properties. It was topped out in March 2013, surpassing the nearby Rosslyn Twin Towers as the tallest building in the Washington metropolitan area.

The building was completed in late 2013. In January 2017 it was announced that Nestle USA will move its headquarters into the building, which had remained vacant until that time. It was the biggest speculative development in the region during the Great Recession.

== History ==
1812 replaces the 11-story 1815 North Fort Myer Drive, once one of the tallest buildings in the region. The developer lobbied the county to have the address renamed 1812 after the War of 1812.

The building was originally proposed in 2005 with 39 floors and a height of 484 feet, and a tapering design quite resembling Atago Mori Tower in Tokyo. The design was eventually shortened and simplified to its current design, which resembles 3100 Clarendon Blvd in the nearby Clarendon neighborhood.

Its height was controversial, due to its rivaling the nearby Washington Monument, as well as being in the flight path of Washington National Airport. While agencies such as the U.S. Commission of Fine Arts and the National Capital Planning Commission have raised objections to tall buildings in the Virginia and Maryland suburbs of Washington, D.C., they have been unsuccessful in stopping construction of such buildings, as they do not have jurisdiction over those areas.

== See also ==
- List of tallest buildings in Arlington County, Virginia
- List of tallest buildings in Virginia
