= Qualified prospect =

A prospect is an organization or potential client that matches a seller's Ideal customer profile (ICP) but has not yet expressed interest in the seller's products or services; a qualified lead, by contrast, is a prospect that has expressed such interest. In sales practice, there is no universally accepted definition of a "qualified" prospect, and sales professionals typically apply their own criteria to determine qualification.

In general terms, sales professionals need to know a set of discrete data in order to determine whether or not the "prospect" will become qualified. These variables may include: business needs, authorization to transact business (financial or operational), money or budget and an "economic buyer" or in other words, who would benefit the most (or lose the most) if the good or service were to be acquired (or not acquired).

Prospect qualification often involves verifying a prospect's fit with the Ideal Customer Profile (ICP). Such a profile helps determine which organizations are the best fit for the proposed solution and have the greatest potential for collaboration. The ICP is a strategic tool used to identify priority target business segments.

The oldest and most widely used qualification frameworks is BANT (Budget, Authority, Need, Timing), developed by IBM in the 1950s as a simple and standardized method for training sales staff.

Another subject in the buying process is usually referred to as either an "influencer" or a "saboteur", someone who, although not the financial or operational authority, exercises a significant level of internal control or leverage in the buying process.

Salespeople face many objections when connecting with prospects, which provide opportunities to demonstrate the product's value and qualify the prospect for closing.

Sales prospecting is the process to reach out to a potential customer. It is the first part of a sales process. After this step, the lead qualification, follow-up and sales activity start.

== See also ==
- Sales process
- Buying center
- Industrial marketing
