= The Challenger Sale =

Non-fiction book by Matthew Dixon, Brent Adamson, and others

The Challenger Sale: Taking Control of the Customer Conversation
- Hardcover edition
- Author: Matthew Dixon, Brent Adamson
- Language: English
- Publisher: Portfolio Penguin (United Kingdom)
- Publication date: November 10, 2011
- Publication place: United States
- Media type: Print (Hardback), E-book
- Pages: 240 pp.
- ISBN: 978-159-1844-35-8

The Challenger Sale is the first non-fiction book by Matthew Dixon, Brent Adamson, and their colleagues at CEB Inc. The book was published on November 10, 2011 by Portfolio/Penguin. In the text, the book argues that relationship-building is no longer the best sales method. To sell complex, large-scale business-to-business solutions, customers are changing how they buy so sales people must change how they sell. The authors’ study found that sales reps fall into one of five profiles, and the challenger seller is the highest performer.

== Reception ==
This book has been an Amazon best-seller in the Sales and Selling category.

== Translated Book ==
(Ukraine) Брент Адамсон, Метью Діксон. Суперпродавці. Як навчитися продавати / пер. Дмитро Кожедуб. — К.: Наш Формат, 2018. — 240 с. — ISBN 978-617-7552-18-4. (in Ukrainian)
