= Warrenton Training Center =

US government communication complex in Virginia, US

- Fauquier County and Culpeper County, Virginia

Site information
- Type: Communications facility
- Owner: United States Department of Defense
- Open to the public: No
- Condition: Fully operational

Location
- Location within Virginia Location within the United States
- Coordinates: 38.7335°N 77.8297°W

Site history
- Built: 1951
- In use: 1951–present

Garrison information
- Occupants: Central Intelligence Agency; Department of State; National Security Agency; United States Army

Warrenton Training Center (WTC) is a classified United States government communication complex located in the state of Virginia. Established in 1951, it comprises four discrete stations located in Fauquier and Culpeper counties.

WTC has served multiple roles, most notably as a Central Intelligence Agency (CIA) signals intelligence facility, satellite relay, numbers station, data center, and communications laboratory. The center also houses at least one underground relocation bunker that serves U.S. continuity of government purposes, and is a communications and signals intelligence training school for various federal departments and agencies, including the CIA, National Security Agency (NSA), Department of Defense and Department of State. Additionally, it is a relay facility for the Department of State's Diplomatic Telecommunications Service. The United States Army administers WTC on behalf of the U.S. government.

== History ==
Warrenton Training Center was established on June 1, 1951, as part of a "Federal Relocation Arc" of hardened underground bunkers built to support continuity of government in the event of a nuclear attack on Washington, D.C. The center was ostensibly designated a Department of Defense Communication Training Activity and served as a communications training school. A "flying saucer" was reportedly observed above the site in 1952. The CIA listed personnel and other expenses at Warrenton Training Center in its fiscal year 1955 budget.

Initially, the United States Army served as the executive agent for the administration and management of the center on behalf of the Department of Defense. In 1973, the center was transferred to the Department of the Army under the administration of its signals intelligence branch, the Army Security Agency, a subordinate to the NSA, and the base was renamed U.S. Army Training Group, Warrenton Training Center. In 1982, the center was restored its original name and reverted to Department of Defense control with the Army as the executive agent for administration on behalf of the National Communications System (NCS).

Under the NCS (dissolved and functions transferred to the United States Department of Homeland Security in 2012), the center is mandated to provide communication for the federal government under any circumstances, including a nuclear attack. Its underground bunkers house communications infrastructure that provides service for most major federal departments. In 2002, the Brookings Institution listed an unspecified WTC "relocation bunker" as a facility with an active nuclear weapons, weapons-related or naval nuclear propulsion mission.

The CIA has used Warrenton Training Center as a communications facility since the 1950s. Short-wave radio enthusiasts have identified WTC antennas broadcasting suspected intelligence transmissions. In 1989, a WTC spokesperson acknowledged that the stations "are operated ... to communicate with embassies, and for espionage transmissions" to American intelligence agents in Cuba and Central America. In 1998, laboratories at WTC were reported to produce concealed radio equipment used to send and receive communications, typically in the form of furniture items.

In 1986, the KGB threw U.S. investigators off the trail of CIA officer and Soviet mole Aldrich Ames by constructing an elaborate diversion whereby a Soviet case officer told a CIA contact that the mole was stationed at Warrenton Training Center. Ames was stationed in Rome at the time. U.S. mole hunters investigated 90 employees at WTC for almost a year and came up with ten suspects, although the lead investigator noted that "there are so many problem personalities that no one stands out."

WTC has continued its role as a communications training facility for various government agencies, including the CIA, NSA, Department of Defense, and the Department of State's Foreign Service Institute. In 1995, a former NSA employee told The Baltimore Sun that WTC's communications training included listening in on the phone calls of U.S. citizens, using a loophole in the 1978 Foreign Intelligence Surveillance Act that permitted domestic eavesdropping so long as the tapes were destroyed immediately afterward.

In April 2013, Dominion Virginia Power representatives indicated that facility expansion plans at WTC had accelerated the need for electrical transmission line upgrades in the area, and in November 2015, Vadata, a subsidiary of Amazon, announced plans to build a $200 million Department of Defense data center on the Station B site near Warrenton. The center addresses a federal government requirement that the cloud infrastructure be entirely separate from the public cloud. In 2018, a second data center was proposed and then constructed by Amazon at Station B.

== Facilities ==
Facility locations in Northern Virginia

Warrenton Training Center is spread across four separate facilities in two different counties. Station A, Station B and Station C are located in Fauquier County, while Station D is located in Culpeper County.

Station A (38.7040°N 77.8112°W), near Warrenton, is an administrative, training and residential compound. Numerous structures on site include both residential and office buildings. Station A is used as a training facility by multiple agencies, including the Department of State and the CIA's Directorate of Intelligence and Directorate of Support.

Station B (38.7335°N 77.8297°W), also near Warrenton, houses the headquarters of WTC and, at 346 acres (140 ha), is the largest of the four facilities. It consists of several multi-story buildings concealed atop the heavily forested View Tree Mountain, two data center facilities, as well as underground bunkers that house communications infrastructure. Operations at Station B include a communications laboratory, communications training, electronics testing, and equipment maintenance. The facility is a node on a fiber-optic cable that runs from Stations C and D, and which also connects WTC with other facilities in the Washington, D.C. area, such as the Tysons Corner Communications Tower (also known as Site E). Station B also houses the Brushwood conference facility, constructed in the 1990s. According to Edward Snowden, who trained at WTC during his time with the CIA, Station B is nicknamed The Hill and administers the agency's overseas technical infrastructure. The United States Environmental Protection Agency classifies Station B as a superfund site due to the presence of an inactive landfill and two chemical pits that have released trichloroethylene into nearby residential drinking water wells.

Station C (38.5195°N 77.7852°W) was at one time a CIA numbers station, which transmitted coded signals to U.S. embassies overseas and intelligence agents in the field. Transmissions carried a female voice, dubbed "Cynthia" by radio hobbyists, that would recite groups of numbers in English. The transmissions were last heard in 2003.

Station D (38.4591°N 77.8487°W), also known as Brandy Station due to its proximity to the community of the same name, is the primary high frequency receiver facility for the CIA Office of Communications, and also hosts a variety of satellite communications ground station facilities. Station D is also a core regional relay facility for the Department of State's Diplomatic Telecommunications Service, a system of secure integrated networks that supports U.S. government departments and agencies operating from diplomatic missions and consulate facilities outside the United States. Station D has seen significant construction in recent years, including several large data center-like buildings, satellite dishes and radomes.
