= NAP of the Americas =

Internet exchange point in Miami, Florida

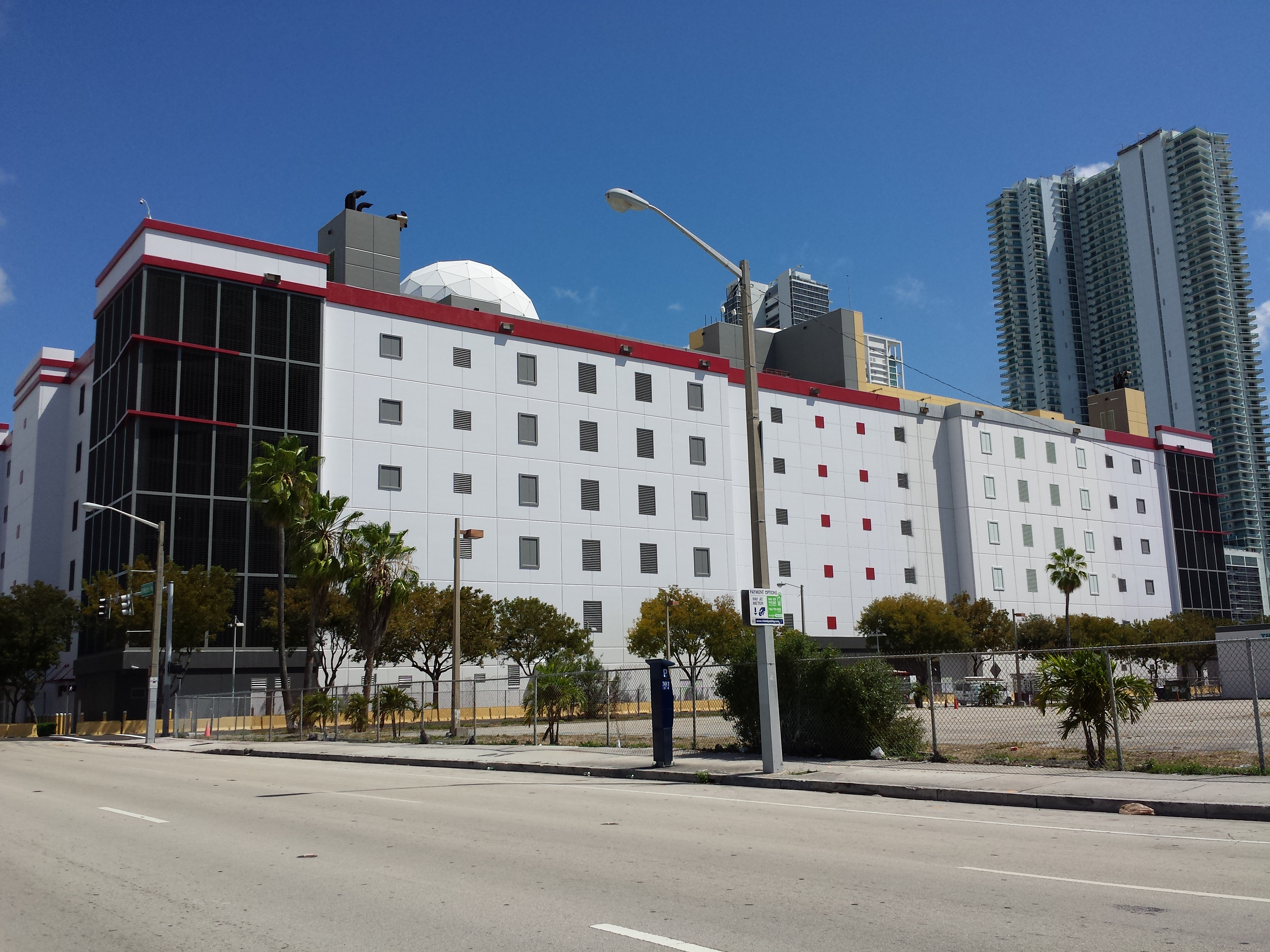
- Former names: Verizon Terremark
- Alternative names: NOTA

General information
- Location: 50 NE 9th Street, Miami, Florida, United States
- Coordinates: 25°46′57″N 80°11′35″W
- Opened: 2001
- Owner: Equinix Inc.

Technical details
- Floor count: 6
- Floor area: 750,000 sq ft (70,000 m^{2})

Website
- Equinix Miami Data Centers

Network Access Point (NAP) of the Americas (called MI1 by Equinix) is a six-story, 750,000 square foot data center and Internet exchange point in Miami, Florida, operated by Equinix. It is one of the world's largest data centers and among the 10 most interconnected data centers in the United States. It is located at 50 NE 9th Street in downtown Miami.

The facility is home to 160 network carriers and is a pathway for data traffic from the Caribbean and South and Central America to more than 150 countries. It is also home to one of the K-roots of the Domain Name System.

The NAP of the Americas is built 32 feet (9.8 m) above sea level and is designed to withstand Category 5 hurricane winds. It provides access to 15 subsea cable landings and serves as a relay for the U.S. Department of State's Diplomatic Telecommunications Service.

== History ==
The NAP of the Americas was built to serve as a major hub for network traffic between the United States and Latin America. It was also known as Verizon Terremark and was operated by Terremark Worldwide (TRMK), a subsidiary of Verizon Communications. In 2016, the building was purchased by Equinix, Inc., along with 23 other buildings, for $3.6 billion.

== Tenants ==
The center is Equinix Miami International Business Exchange (IBX) data facility (Equinix MI1 IBX), offering direct peering access to more than 600 Equinix business and enterprise customers, including more than 160 enterprises and 135 networks, cloud and IT services. Peering networks include AWS, Microsoft Azure, Google Cloud Platform, IBM Cloud, Oracle, Voxility, INAP.

== See also ==
- List of Internet exchange points
