= Tysons Corner Communications Tower =

Military communications tower

- Tysons Corner, Virginia
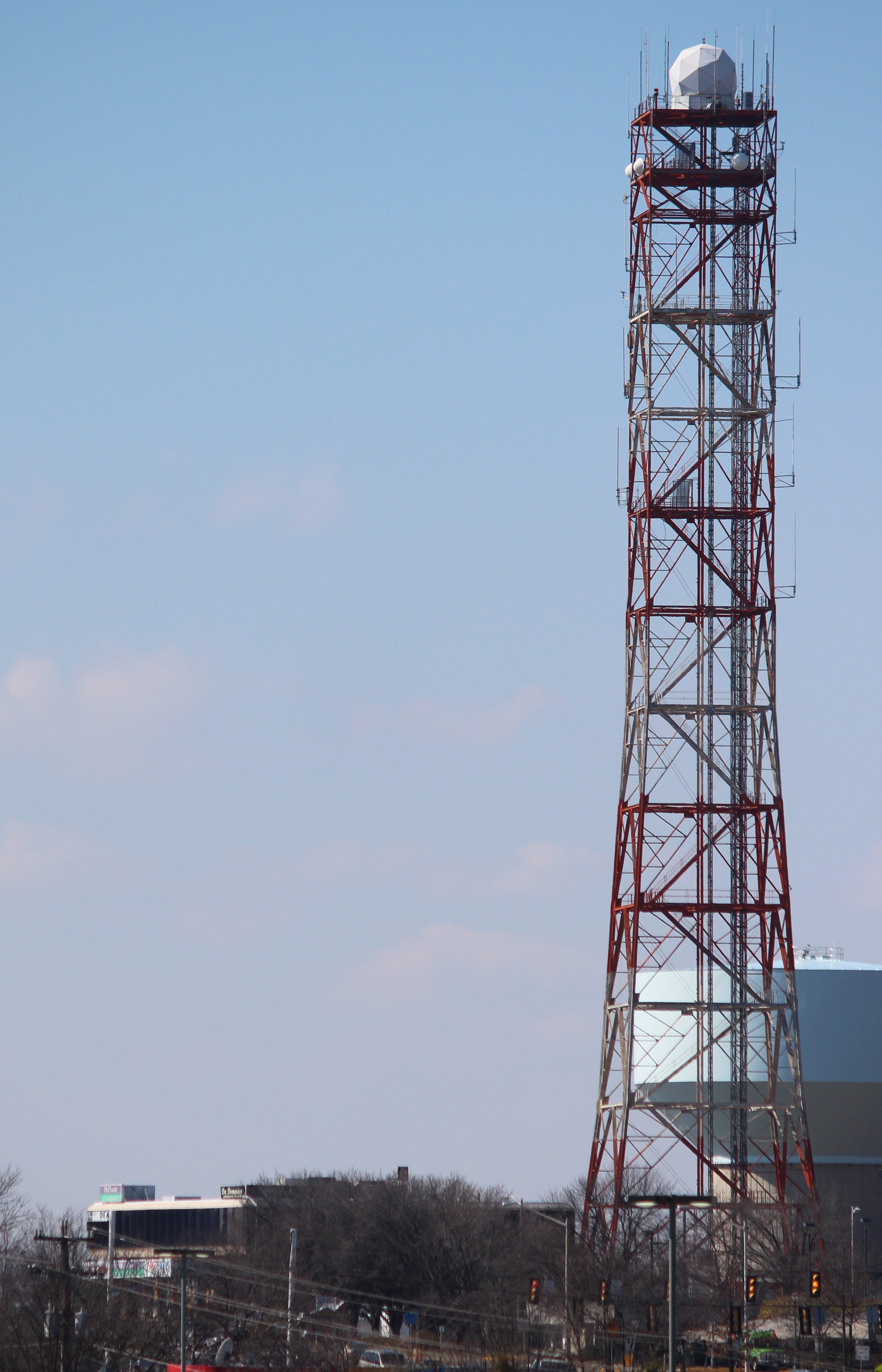
- The tower from the east

Site information
- Owner: U.S. Government
- Controlled by: U.S. Army

Location
- Coordinates: 38.9203°N 77.2298°W

Site history
- Built: 1952
- In use: 1952–present

Tysons Corner Communications Tower, also known as Site E, is a classified United States military microwave tower located in Tysons Corner, Virginia. The tower is administered by the United States Army from Fort Belvoir.

== History ==
The tower was constructed in 1952 as part of a continuity of government plan to ensure that lines of command were preserved between the U.S. President and military bases and troops in the field in the event of a nuclear attack. In the event that defense communication facilities in Washington, DC, were disabled, there were two alternate communication facilities on Cross Mountain in Pennsylvania and Lambs Knoll, Maryland. Another tower just south of the Raven Rock Mountain Complex in southern Pennsylvania relayed signals from these two backup sites to the Washington defense facilities, along with the Pentagon, White House, the State Department and other government facilities. However, the alternate communications facilities were located on the west side of the Blue Ridge Mountains, and the microwave signals could not carry directly to Washington, thus the Tysons Corner tower was built to serve as the major relay between Washington and these facilities to the west. It was selected because it is close to the Pentagon and the White House but far enough away from Washington to withstand a direct nuclear attack on the city.

The specific uses of the tower today are classified. It was rumored to be a government intelligence numbers station, although others argue that the tower's communications equipment is now obsolete. Several microwave antennas have been removed from the tower, including those pointed to Mount Weather Emergency Operations Center. It is speculated that these have been replaced by fiber-optic cable links. Additionally, the tower is reportedly connected by underground fiber-optic cable to Warrenton Training Center, which is a continuity of government facility as well as a Central Intelligence Agency communications facility.

== See also ==
- List of tallest buildings in Tysons, Virginia
- Mount Weather Emergency Operations Center
- Raven Rock Mountain Complex
- Warrenton Training Center
