= Capital One Tower (Virginia) =

Office building in Tysons, Virginia

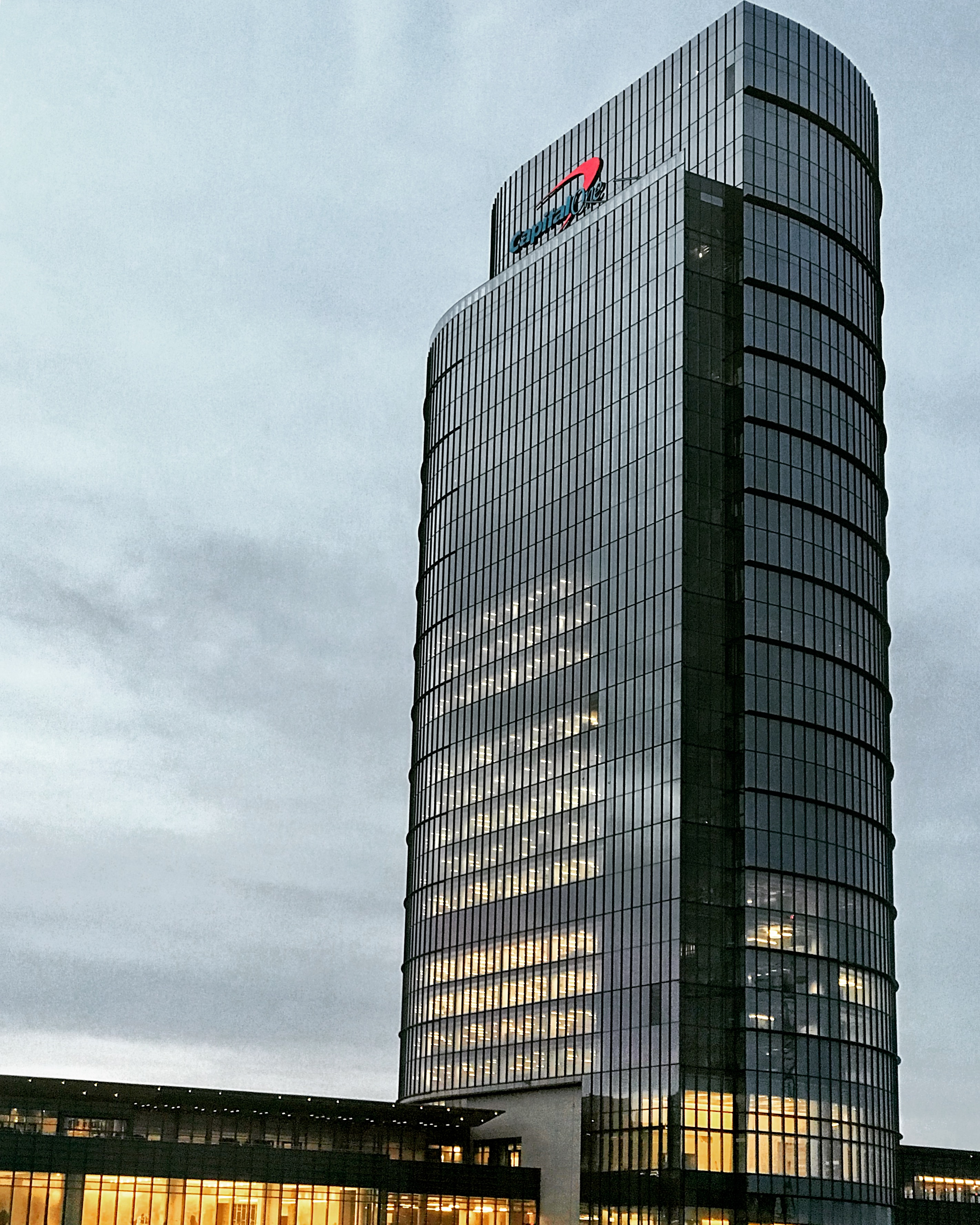
- Capital One Tower

General information
- Location: 1600 Capital One Drive, Tysons, Virginia
- Coordinates: 38°55′34″N 77°12′45″W
- Current tenants: Capital One
- Named for: Capital One
- Groundbreaking: 2014
- Completed: 2018
- Owner: Capital One
- Height: 470 feet (143 m)

Technical details
- Floor count: 31
- Floor area: 940,500 sq ft (87,380 m^{2})
- Lifts/elevators: 28

Design and construction
- Architecture firm: HKS Architects (Base Building) and Bonstra Haresign ARCHITECTS (Master Planning) and CallisonRTKL (Interiors)
- Structural engineer: Thornton Tomasetti
- Civil engineer: Gordon
- Main contractor: Davis/Gilford

Capital One Tower is a high-rise office building in Capital One Center, a mixed-use development adjacent to the McLean station in Tysons, Virginia. Capital One Tower is the tallest occupied building in the Washington metropolitan area at 470 feet (143 m) in height and the second-tallest building in Virginia. Ground was broken on the tower in November 2014 and it was completed in 2018. It is part of the headquarters of Capital One. Capital One Tower is one of many skyscrapers that have been constructed for the urbanization project in Tysons, Virginia.

When complete, Capital One Center will contain over 5 million square feet of development, including a 1.2 acre public skypark, performing arts center, hotel, Wegmans supermarket, restaurants, and other retail.

== Gallery ==
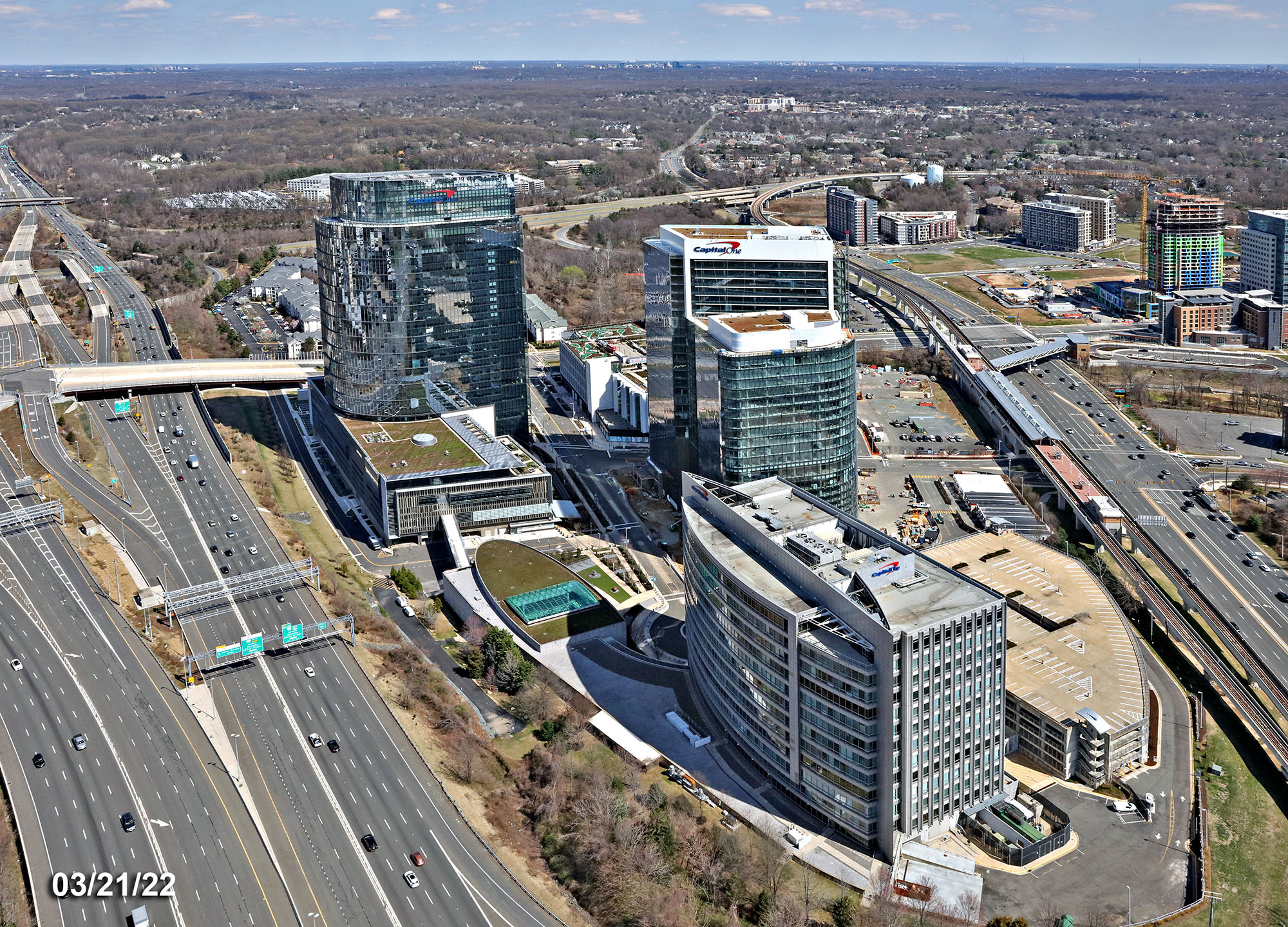
Capital One Center; Looking North

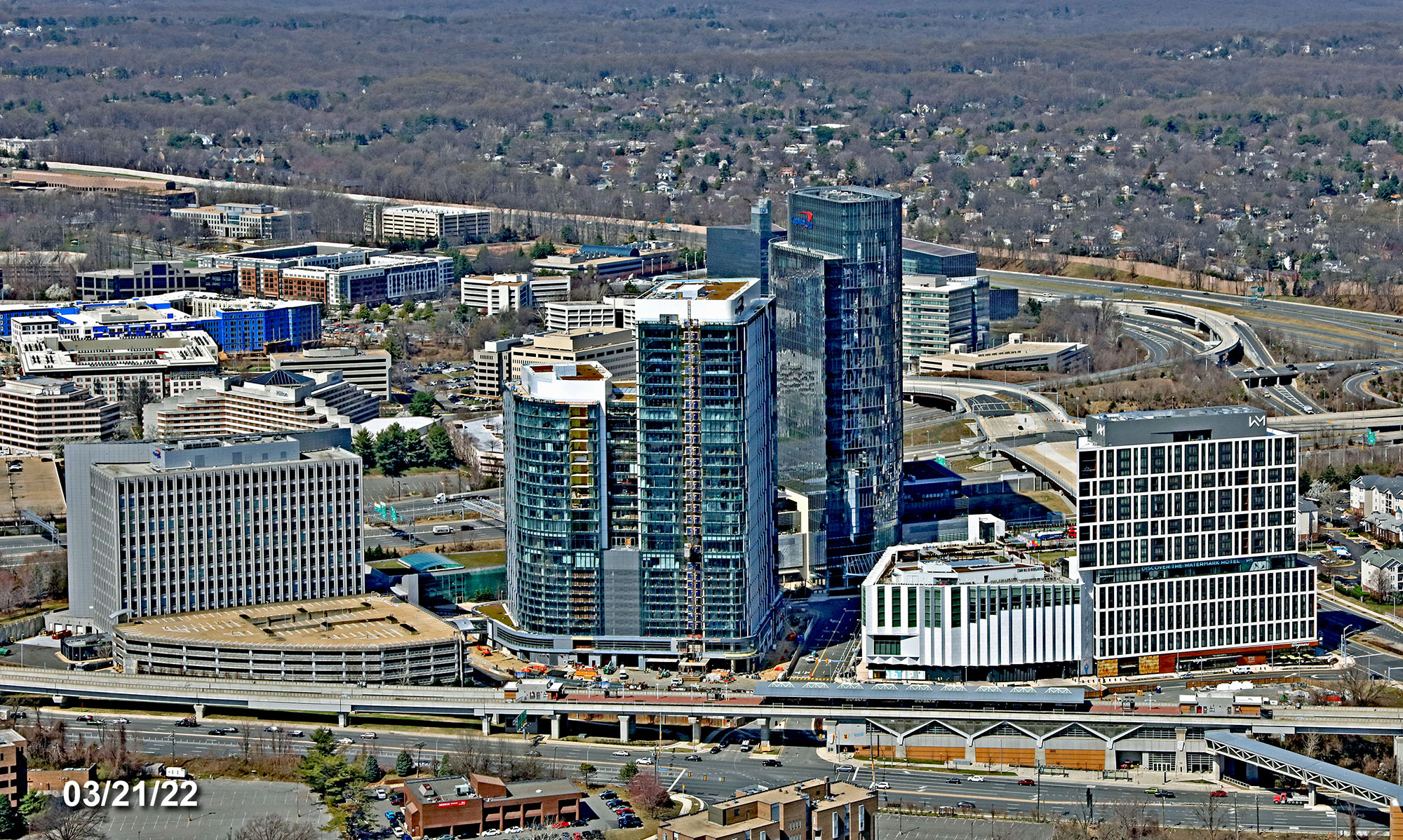
Capital One Center; Looking Northwest

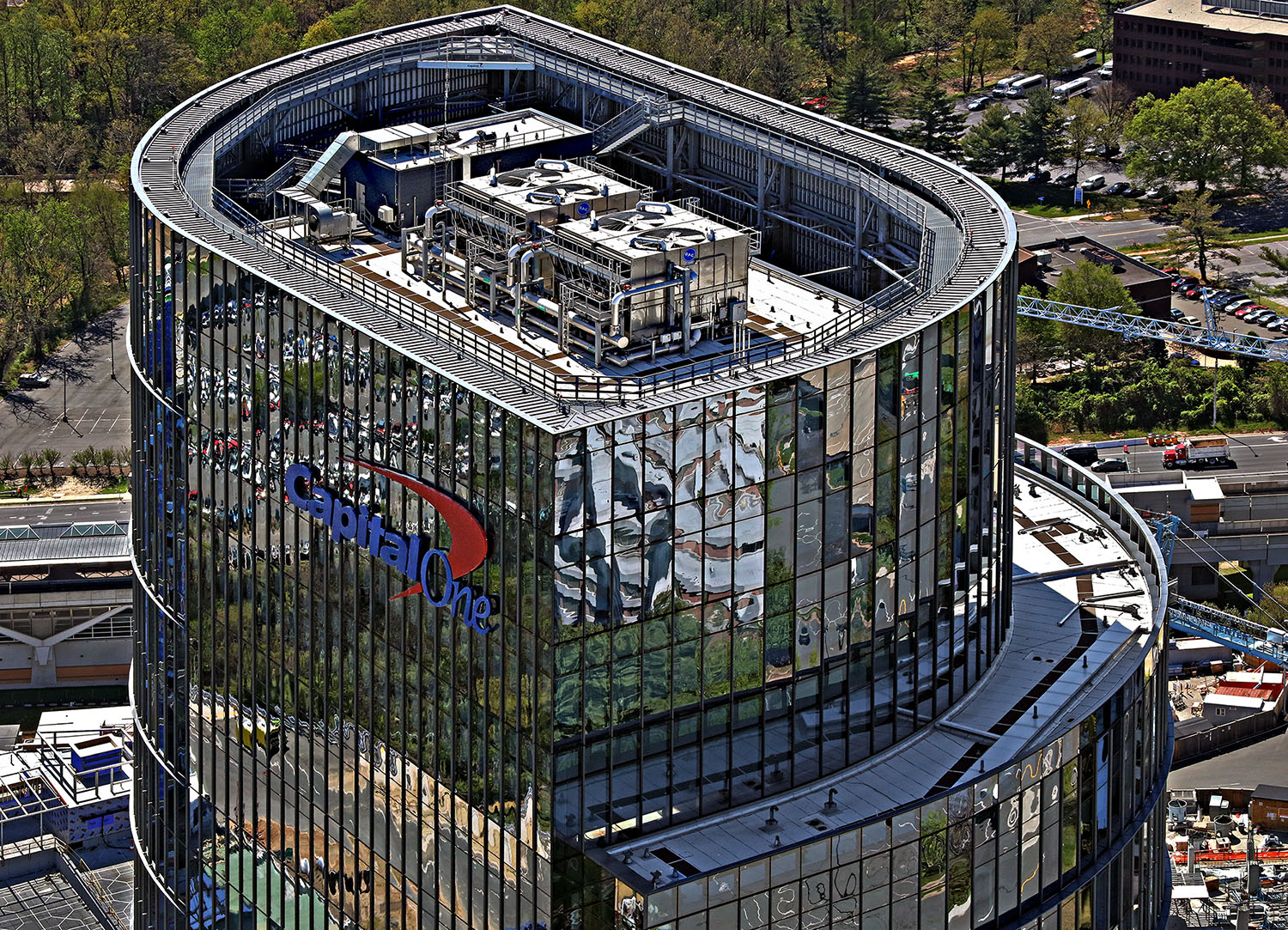
Capital One Tower, April 2020

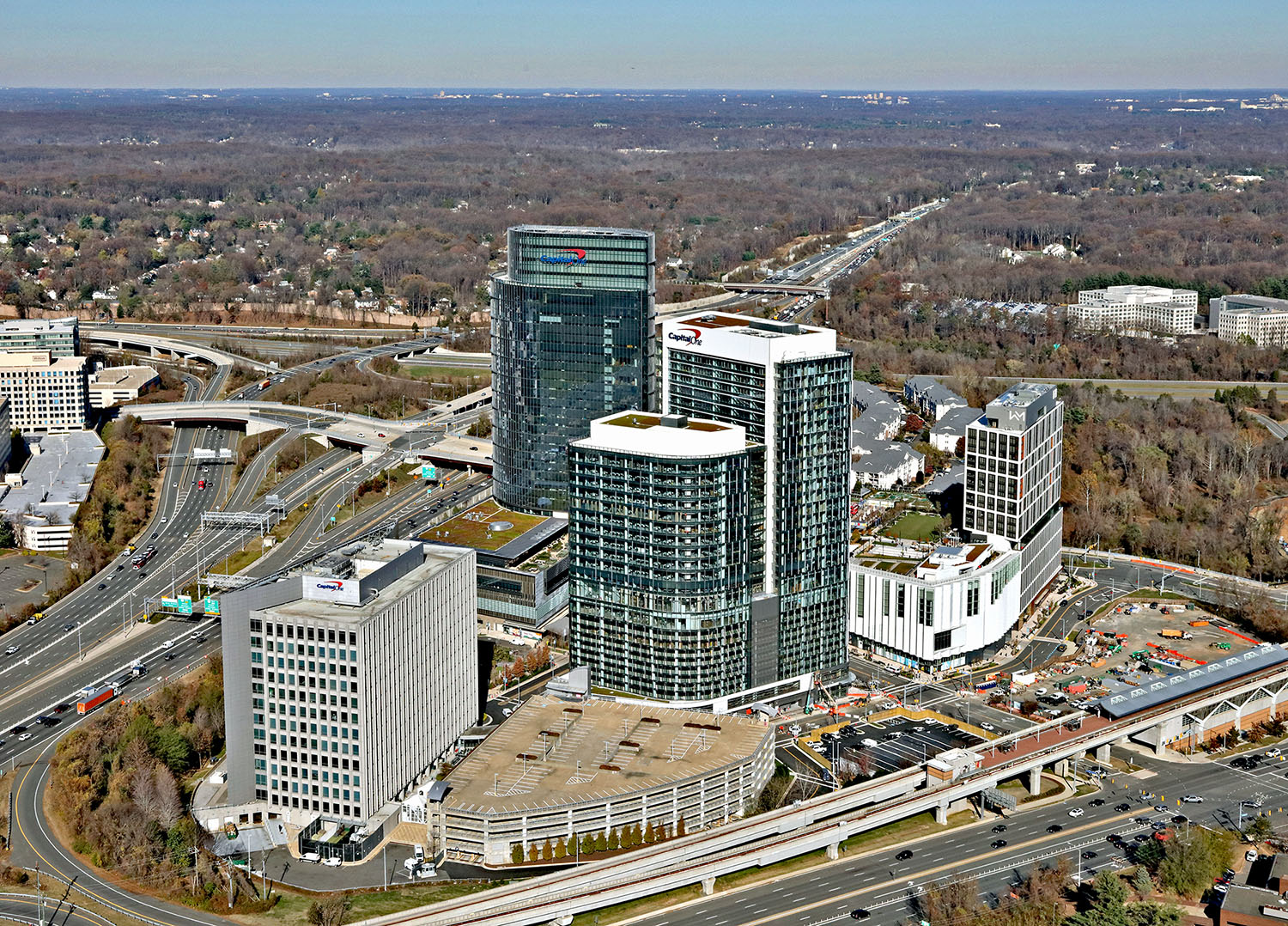
Capital One Center, November 2022

== See also ==
- List of tallest buildings in Virginia
- List of tallest buildings in Tysons, Virginia
