= Scotts Run =

Project
- Developer: Cityline Partners, LLC

Location
- Interactive map of Scotts Run
- Coordinates: 38.924980°N 77.208303°W
- Location: Tysons, Virginia, USA

Scotts Run, formerly Scotts Run Station, is a mixed-use development featuring offices, apartments, hotels, retail stores, and restaurants in Tysons, Virginia being developed by Cityline Partners, LLC.

== Description ==
Scotts Run is split into two sections, Scotts Run South and Scotts Run North, on both sides of Dolley Madison Boulevard between the interchanges with I-495 and SR 267 in the Tysons East section of Tysons, Virginia. It is adjacent to the Washington Metro McLean station on the south and east sides of the station. The development is also split from north to south by the Scotts Run Stream Valley Park. Expected square footage of the developments are 1,500,000 square feet (140,000 m^{2}) on 9.4 acres (3.8 ha) in Scotts Run North and 6,600,000 square feet (610,000 m^{2}) on 36 acres (15 ha) in Scotts Run South.

Scotts Run Station will include up to two dozen buildings, 7 in the north and 17 in the south. Several of these buildings will be over 300 feet (91 m) in height.

== History ==
Early render of overall project showing both north and south sections.

Originally proposed in 2011 as "Scotts Run Station", Scotts Run was intended to leverage the Tysons Comprehensive Plan to establish a large, mixed-use neighborhood similar to Reston Town Center. The project was later split into two separate sections, "Scotts Run Station South" and "Scotts Run Station North" and the "Station" portion was dropped from both names. The south section was approved by the Fairfax County Board of Supervisors in 2012 while the north section was put on hold. While work on the initial buildings on the south section started, the north section was converted to a parking lot to support the newly opened McLean station. In 2014, the application for Scotts Run North was reactivated.

=== South progress ===
Scotts Run South was approved by the Fairfax County Board of Supervisors in April, 2013. The first office building, MITRE Building 4, was completed in 2015. The first residential building, The Haden, was completed in 2016. In mid 2017, construction started on two additional residential buildings and the first retail space within the development. In July, 2017, Skanska, a Swedish developer, announced the purchase of a portion of the area with the intention of developing a 350 unit apartment building with ground floor retail by 2022.

=== North progress ===
Scotts Run North was approved by the Fairfax County Board of Supervisors in June, 2015.

== See also ==
- List of tallest buildings in Tysons, Virginia
