= List of tallest buildings in Tysons, Virginia =

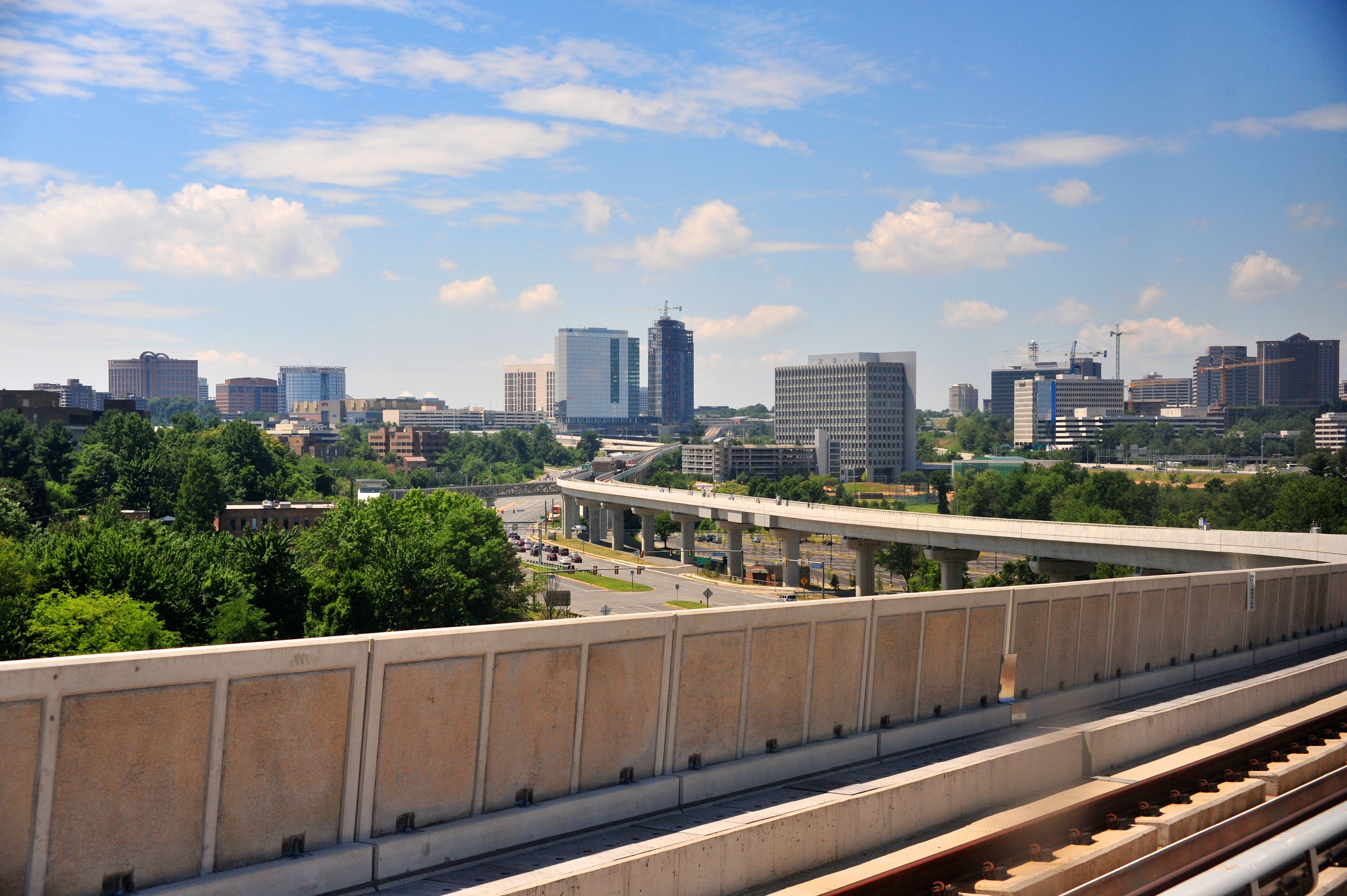
The Tysons skyline viewed from the Silver Line in 2014

Tysons (also known by its former official name Tysons Corner),^{[a]} a census-designated place (CDP) and unincorporated community in Fairfax County, Virginia, contains at least 18 high-rise buildings that stand 200 feet (61 m) or taller. Capital One Tower is currently the tallest building. Standing 470 feet (140 m) tall, it was completed in 2018. VITA Tysons Corner had previously held the record since 2015.

== History ==
Development by the military and intelligence sectors in Tysons began in 1952 with the construction of a 330-foot (100 m) microwave transmission tower, known as the Tysons Corner Communications Tower, by the United States Army. Built upon the highest elevation in Fairfax County, the tower relayed microwave transmissions between Washington, D.C., and government facilities near the Blue Ridge Mountains to enable emergency continuity of government. Tysons itself was a rural crossroads community until 1961, when the Central Intelligence Agency completed its headquarters in nearby Langley. This spurred defense contractors to set up offices in Tysons. In 1962, real estate developer WestGroup received county approval to build its WestGate and WestPark office parks in Tysons which were among the first in the area. That same year, the county also approved plans for Lerner Enterprises to build the Tysons Corner Center shopping mall, which subsequently opened in 1968.

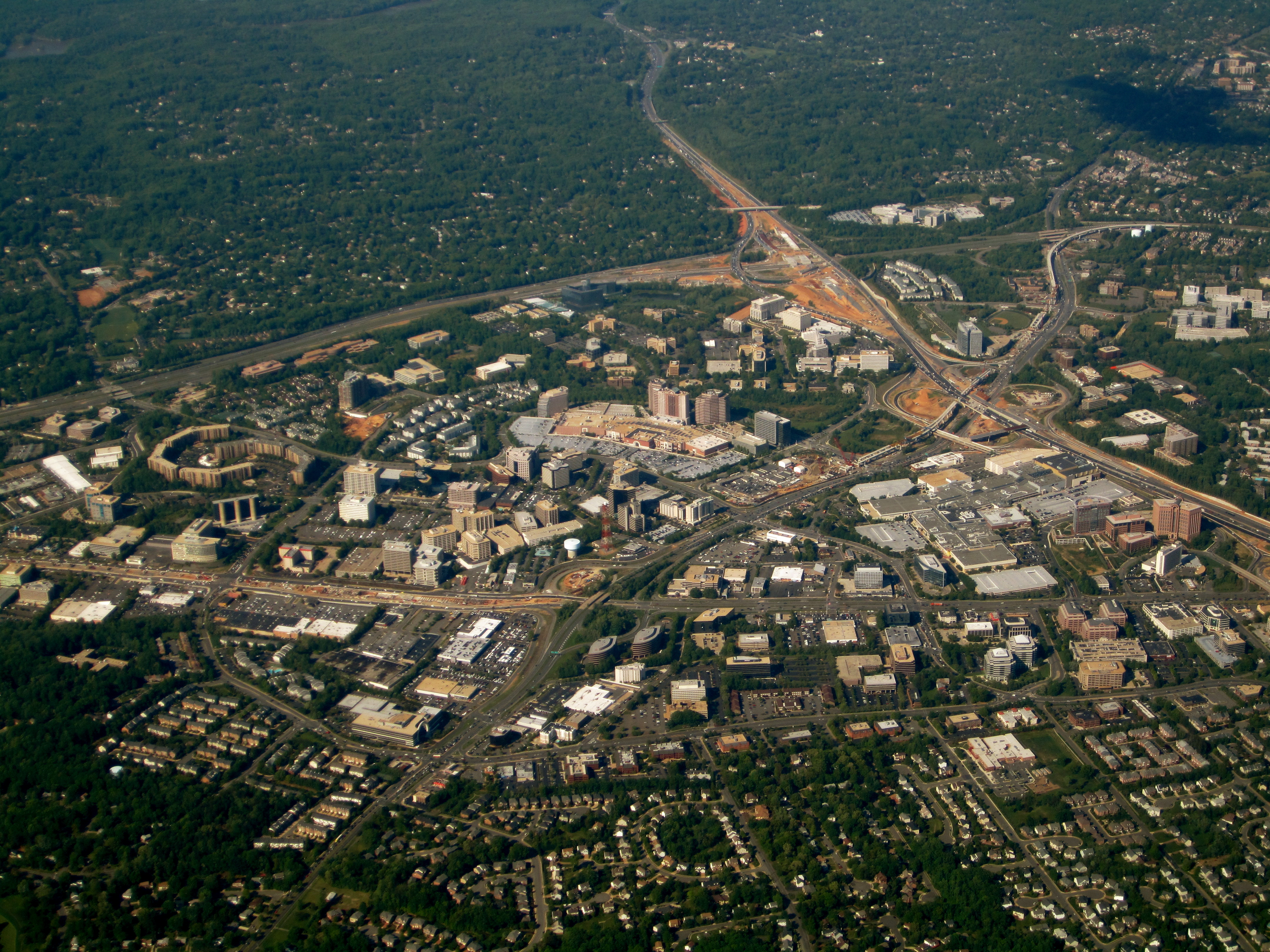
Aerial image of Tysons in 2010

By the mid-1980s, the Fairfax County supervisors approved an easing of the county's 75-foot (23 m) height limit to allow for the construction of the never-built 204-foot (62 m) Tysons Tower office building at the intersection of the Capital Beltway and Virginia Route 7. By 1985, Fairfax County officials considered a plan to construct "gateways" which consisted of pairs of buildings as high as 22 stories or 215 feet (66 m) at key intersections along the Capital Beltway, the Dulles Access Road, Virginia Route 7, and Virginia Route 123. County officials sought to make Tysons into Fairfax County's "new downtown." The plan also called for proposing a rooftop height limit of 730 feet (220 m) as the maximum height for future construction projects.

In June 2010, the Fairfax County supervisors authorized a plan to transform Tysons from an automobile-dependent suburb into a "walkable city." By 2011, Tysons had 26,700,000 square feet (2,480,000 m^{2}) of office space; higher than the metropolitan areas of San Antonio, Texas and Jacksonville, Florida. Increased high-rise construction in Tysons was further spurred by the construction and opening of the Silver Line of the Washington Metro, which has four stations in Tysons: Spring Hill, Greensboro, Tysons, and McLean. The Capital One Headquarters, under construction near the McLean station as of 2019, contains the tallest building in Tysons and the Washington metropolitan area at 470 feet (140 m), and is the second-tallest non-communication structure in the Washington metropolitan area after the Washington Monument (which stands 554 feet 7 11/32 inches (169.046 m)). 1775 Tysons Boulevard, constructed by Lerner Enterprises near Tysons station, is the first building in Tysons to achieve platinum status under the Leadership in Energy and Environmental Design (LEED) building rating system and among the first in the Washington metropolitan area.

Tysons has the 8th largest retail square footage in the United States with 4,800,000 square feet (450,000 m^{2}). Tysons is home to the corporate headquarters of five Fortune 500 companies: Freddie Mac, Capital One, Hilton Worldwide, Booz Allen Hamilton, and Gannett Company.

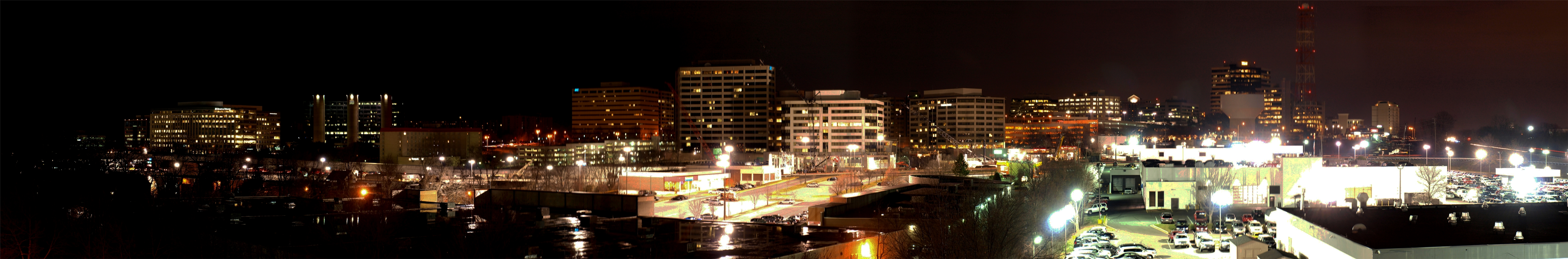
The skyline of Tysons photographed at nighttime (2012)

== Tallest buildings ==
There are at least 18 completed or topped out skyscrapers in Tysons that stand at least 200 feet (61 m) tall, based on standard height measurement which includes spires and architectural details but does not include antenna masts.

Rank	Name^{[b]}	Image	Height ft (m)	Floors	Year completed	Notes
1	Capital One Tower		470 feet (143 m)	31	2018	Tallest building in Northern Virginia and the Washington metropolitan area.
2	Capital One Center M3		410 (125)	24	2023	
3	VITA Tysons Corner	VITA Tysons Corner	367 (112)	30	2015	
4	Lumen at Tysons	Lumen at Tysons	365 (111)	32	2018	Known prior to development as Tysons Central Building F.
5	Adaire	Adaire	360 (110)	34	2016	Formerly known as The Elan.
6	Nouvelle		340.67 (104)	27	2015	
7	Rise at the Boro		340 (104)	32	2019	
—	Tysons Corner Communications Tower		330 (101)	—	1952	
8	Tysons Tower	Tysons Tower	318 (97)	22	2014	
9	Verse at the Boro		310 (94)	25	2019	
10	The Mather		308 (94)	27	2024	Two apartment style high-rise buildings for adults 62 and older
11	The Heming		300 (91)	28	2023	Luxury condominium building with 410 residential units and 40,000 square feet of retail space.
12	The Watermark Hotel		298 (91)	25	2021	Luxury hotel connected to the Perch
13	8350 Broad	8350 Broad	276 (84)	20	2019	
14	Ascent at Spring Hill Station	Ascent at Spring Hill Station	275 (84)	26	2014	
15	Tysons Central		263.67 (80)	20	2022	Mixed use office building
16	Ritz-Carlton Tysons Corner	Ritz-Carlton Tysons Corner	254 (77)	24	1999	
17	1850 Towers Crescent Plaza	—	253 (77)	13	2009	
18	One Park Crest	—	238.56 (73)	19	2008	
19	1775 Tysons Boulevard	1775 Tysons Boulevard	237 (72)	17	2016	
20	1650 Tysons Boulevard	1650 Tysons Boulevard	236 (72)	17	1989	
21	1750 Tysons Boulevard	1750 Tysons Boulevard	235 (72)	17	1999	
22	8000 Towers Crescent Drive	—	234 (71)	17	1985	Also known locally as "The Shopping Bag" for its distinctive shape, and formerly known as Tycon Center and Tycon Towers.
23	Pinnacle Towers North	—	231 (70)	17	1989	Formerly known as First Union Center.
24	Gannett Corporate Headquarters	Gannett Corporate Headquarters	226 (69)	11	2001	
25	Sheraton Tysons Hotel	Sheraton Tysons Hotel	215 (66)	24	1986	

== Tallest buildings under construction or proposed ==
=== Under construction ===
The following buildings under construction in Tysons are expected to rise at least 200 feet (61 m).

Name	Image	Height* ft (m)	Floors	Year*	Notes
The Trillium	—	195 (59)	14	2024	

=== Proposed ===
There are numerous buildings proposed in Tysons that are expected to rise at least 200 feet (61 m).

Name	Height ft (m)	Floors	Notes
Iconic Tower (Building C-3) at The View	600 (180)	30	If built, will be the tallest structure in the Greater Washington region.
Building C-1 at The View	455 (139)	27	Building will be topped by a 55 ft tall unoccupied sloping feature.
Building 7 at Capital One	400 (120)	39	
Building C1 at Dominion Square	400 (120)	33	
Building C-2B at The View	396 (121)	35	
Building D-1 at The View	395 (120)	29	
Johnson Building B at Scotts Run South	397 (121)	32	
Building C-2A at The View	389 (119)	33	
Johnson Building A at Scotts Run South	363 (111)	29	
Building 8 at Capital One	373 (114)	34	
Building C2 at Dominion Square	360 (110)	29	
Grant Building A at Scotts Run South	350 (110)	28	
Building C at Scotts Run North	325 (99)	25	
Building C7 at Dominion Square	325 (99)	23	
Building A at Scotts Run North	322 (98)	28	
Building 4 at Capital One	305 (93)	18	
Building C8 at Dominion Square	300 (91)	22	
Building C10 at Dominion Square	300 (91)	22	
Building S1 at Sunburst	280 (85)	28	
Building C3 at Dominion Square	280 (85)	28	
Johnson Building C at Scotts Run South	276 (84)	28	
Tower A at Greensboro	275 (84)	26	
Johnson Building D at Scotts Run South	271 (83)	28	
1725 Tysons Boulevard	270 (82)	23	
Building S2 at Sunburst	270 (82)	27	
Building C4 at Dominion Square	270 (82)	27	
Building C5 at Dominion Square	260 (79)	27	
Building C6 at Dominion Square	260 (79)	27	
Building C9 at Dominion Square	250 (76)	25	
Building C12 at Dominion Square	250 (76)	25	
Taylor Building B at Scotts Run South	246 (75)	21	
Building 11 at Capital One	245 (75)	15	
Building 2 at Anderson Park	245 (75)	22	
Building 5 at Anderson Park	245 (75)	22	
Building 6 at Anderson Park	245 (75)	22	
Building S4 at Sunburst	245 (75)	20	
Grant Building B at Scotts Run South	243 (74)	24	
Tower B at Greensboro	235 (72)	22	
Building 12 at Capital One	225 (69)	14	
Westgate Building A at Scotts Run South	222 (68)	18	
Building S3 at Sunburst	220 (67)	18	
Building D at Scotts Run North	215 (66)	17	
Lincoln Building A at Scotts Run South	211 (64)	18	
Van Buren Building A at Scotts Run South	208 (63)	21	

== Timeline of tallest buildings ==
Name	Image	Height	Floors	Years	Notes
8000 Towers Crescent Drive	—	234 (71)	17	1985-1989	
1650 Tysons Boulevard	1650 Tysons Boulevard	236 (72)	17	1989-1999	
Ritz-Carlton Tysons Corner	Ritz-Carlton Tysons Corner	254 (77)	24	1999-2014	
Tysons Tower	Tysons Tower	318 (97)	22	2014-2015	
VITA Tysons Corner	VITA Tysons Corner	367 (112)	30	2015-2018	
Capital One Tower		470 (143)	31	2018–present	Tallest building in Northern Virginia and the Washington metropolitan area.

== See also ==
- List of tallest buildings in Virginia
- List of tallest buildings in Arlington County, Virginia
- List of tallest buildings in Washington, D.C.
