= List of tallest buildings in the Washington metropolitan area =

Tall buildings in the Washington metropolitan area
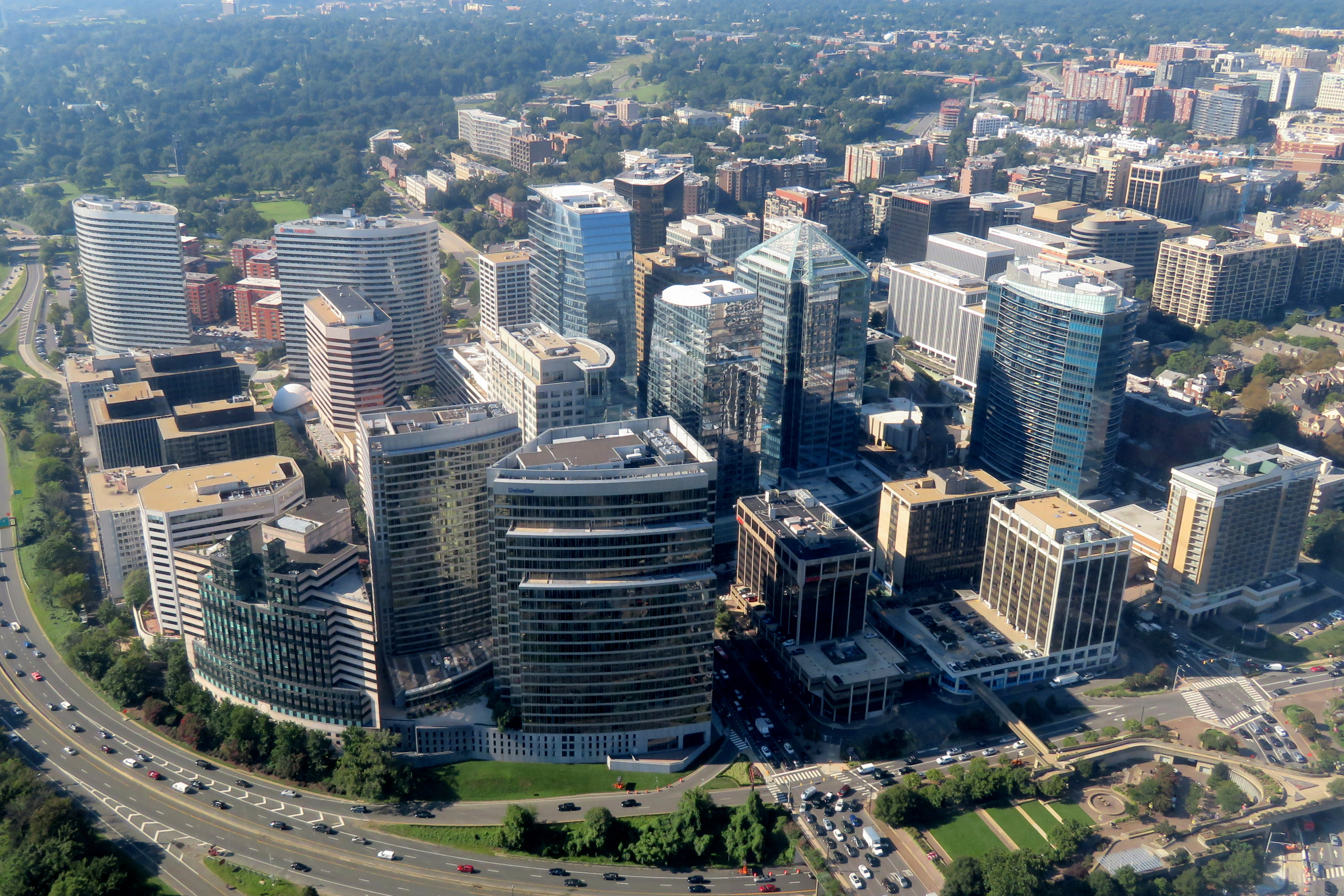
- Skyline of Rosslyn, Arlington in 2018
- Population: 6,436,489 (2024)
- Tallest building: Capital One Tower (2018)
- Tallest building height: 470 ft (143.3 m)
- Tallest structure: Washington Monument (1884)
- Tallest structure height: 555 ft (169 m)
- Major clusters: Rosslyn; Tysons; Bethesda; Reston; Crystal City

Number of tall buildings (2026)
- Taller than 100 m (328 ft): 23

Number of tall buildings — feet
- Taller than 300 ft (91.4 m): 36

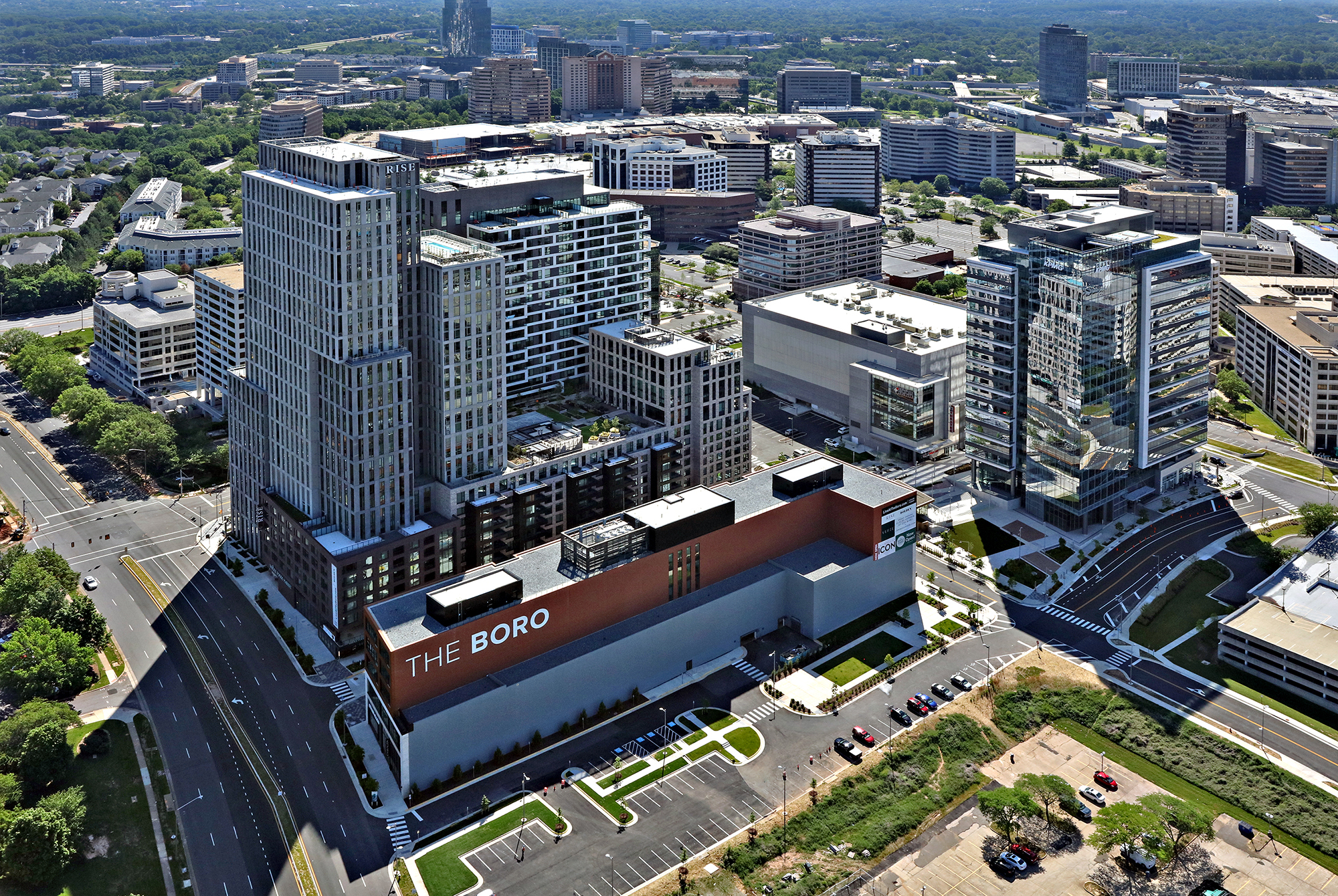
High-rises in Tysons, Virginia

The Washington metropolitan area, with a population of 6.4 million, is centered on Washington D.C., the capital of the United States. The Height of Buildings Act of 1899 and 1901 limits building heights in Washington D.C. to a maximum of 130 feet (40 m) in most cases. As a result, Washington D.C. is devoid of skyscrapers, and there are no buildings with over 20 stories. Instead, the majority of high-rise buildings in the area are located outside the capital. This distribution is unique among American cities. With 36 buildings taller than 300 ft (91 m) as of 2026, the Washington metropolitan area has fewer tall buildings than other U.S. metropolitan areas of a similar size. It is the largest metropolitan area in the United States without a skyscraper taller than 492 feet (150 m). Since 2018, the tallest building in the Washington metropolitan area has been the 470 ft (143 m) Capital One Tower in Tysons, Virginia.

The Washington Monument, which rises 555 feet (169 m), has been the tallest free-standing structure in both Washington D.C. and its metropolitan area since its completion in 1884. However, as it is not a habitable building, the title of the tallest building in both Washington D.C. was taken by the Old Post Office in 1899 via its 315 ft (96 m) clock tower, which was constructed before the city's height restrictions were enacted. Before the 1980s, the only other buildings that surpassed 300 ft (91 m) in height were the George Washington Masonic National Memorial and the Basilica of the National Shrine of the Immaculate Conception.

Beginning in the 1960s, the unincorporated area of Rosslyn in Arlington County, Virginia, was rezoned to allow for high-rise commercial development. Later urban plans included more residential space, orienting the area towards mixed-use development. In 1982, the Rosslyn Twin Towers became the tallest buildings in the metropolitan area. High-rise development became more common from the 1970s onwards in the metropolitan area. The Washington Metro, which opened in 1976, encouraged transit-oriented development in multiple locations besides Rosslyn. The rate of construction increased substantially in the 2010s, particularly in the census-designated place (CDP) of Tysons, also known as Tyson's Corner. Capital One Tower was completed there in 2018, and the metropolitan area's second tallest building, Capital One Center M3, was built nearby in 2022.

The two largest concentrations of high-rises are in Rosslyn, which sits southwest of Washington D.C. directly across the Potomac River, and in Tysons, which is about ten miles west of the capital. In addition to Rosslyn, significant high-rise clusters in Arlington County include Ballston and Crystal City (whose high-rise footprint extends to Pentagon City). Notable clusters elsewhere that include buildings taller than 300 ft (91 m) include Bethesda, Maryland and Reston, Virginia. Shorter high-rise groupings can be found in Eisenhower East and Bailey's Crossroads in Virginia, and North Bethesda, Rockville, and Silver Spring in Maryland. Besides Silver Spring, these clusters are all located west of Washington D.C.

== History ==
Number of high-rise buildings by height in the Washington metropolitan area by the end of each year, based on the list below. Click on the legend to toggle a specific height on or off. View chart definition.

== Map of tallest buildings ==
The following map shows the distribution of buildings taller than 300 ft (91 m) in the Washington metropolitan area. Individual buildings that are not part of a cluster of multiple 300 ft (91 m) buildings are colored by their decade of completion and numbered by their height rank. The named clusters are shown in further detail below.

Buildings taller than 300 ft (91 m) in the Washington metropolitan area.
- 1950s and before
- 1980s
- 1990s
- 2000s
- 2010s
- 2020s
1 Capital One Tower
2 Skymark Reston Town Center
3 Capital One Center M3
4 Central Place Tower
5 2000 Opportunity Way
6 1812 N Moore
7 Hilton at The Key
8 Lumen at Tysons
9 Rosslyn Twin Tower One
10 Rosslyn Twin Tower Two
11 One Skyline Tower
12 VITA
13 Adaire
14 Rise at the Boro
15 Central Place Residential Tower
16 1801 North Lynn Street
17 Nouvelle
18 The Wilson
19 Hilton Alexandria Mark Center
20 George Washington Masonic National Memorial
21 The Elm
22 Basilica of the National Shrine of the Immaculate Conception
23 Marriott International Headquarters
24 Metropolitan Park Building 6
25 Metropolitan Park Building 7/8
26 Tysons Tower
27 Old Post Office
28 Turnberry Tower
29 Verse at the Boro
30 The Mather
31 Reva
32 The Grace
33 Washington National Cathedral
34 Two Waterview Place
35 One Waterview Place
36 The Heming

=== By cluster ===
Rosslyn
Buildings taller than 300 ft (91 m)
- 1980s
- 2000s
- 2010s
- 2020s
4 Central Place Tower
6 1812 N Moore
7 Hilton at The Key
9 Rosslyn Twin Tower One
10 Rosslyn Twin Tower Two
15 Central Place Residential Tower
16 1801 North Lynn Street
28 Turnberry Tower
34 Two Waterview Place
35 One Waterview Place

Tysons
Buildings taller than 300 ft (91 m)
- 2010s
- 2020s
1 Capital One Tower
3 Capital One Center M3
8 Lumen at Tysons
12 VITA
13 Adaire
14 Rise at the Boro
17 Nouvelle
26 Tysons Tower
29 Verse at the Boro
30 The Mather
36 The Heming

Crystal City/Pentagon City
Buildings taller than 300 ft (91 m)
- 2020s
24 Metropolitan Park Building 6
25 Metropolitan Park Building 7/8
31 Reva
32 The Grace

Bethesda
Buildings taller than 300 ft (91 m)
- 2020s
18 The Wilson
21 The Elm
23 Marriott International Headquarters

== Tallest buildings ==
This list ranks completed skyscrapers and high-rises in the Washington metropolitan area that stand at least 300 ft (91 m) tall as of 2026, based on standard height measurement. This includes spires and architectural details but does not include antenna masts. The “Year” column indicates the year of completion. Free-standing structures are included for comparison purposes.

Was the tallest building in the Washington metropolitan area upon completion

| Rank | Name | Image | City | Height ft (m) | Floors | Year | Purpose | Notes |
|---|---|---|---|---|---|---|---|---|
| N/A | Washington Monument | | Washington, D.C. 38°53′22″N 77°02′07″W | 555 (169) | 3 | 1884 | Monument | Tallest masonry structure in the District. Was the tallest structure in the world from 1884 until 1889, and the tallest monument in the U.S. until the completion of San Jacinto in 1939. Not a habitable building; included for comparison purposes. |
| 1 | Capital One Tower | | Tysons, VA 38°55′34″N 77°12′45″W | 470 (143.3) | 31 | 2018 | Office | Tallest building in Northern Virginia, second tallest building in Virginia, and tallest office building in the Washington metropolitan area. |
| 2 | Skymark Reston Town Center | | Reston, VA 38°57′20″N 77°21′42″W | 433 (132) | 40 | 2025 | Mixed-use | The tallest building in Reston and the tallest mixed-use residential tower in the Washington Metropolitan Area. |
| 3 | Capital One Center M3 | | Tysons, VA 38°55′30″N 77°12′43″W | 410 (125) | 30 | 2022 | Office | Topped out in 2021. |
| 4 | Central Place Tower | | Rosslyn, VA 38°53′44″N 77°04′16″W | 390 (118.9) | 31 | 2018 | Office | Tallest building in Arlington since 2017. The View of DC provides access to the top two floors, with a publicly accessible vantage point that opened June 21, 2018. Also known as CEB Tower. |
| 5 | 2000 Opportunity Way | | Reston, VA 38°57′15″N 77°21′41″W | 387 (118) | 28 | 2021 | Office | |
| 6 | 1812 N Moore | | Rosslyn, VA 38°53′47″N 77°04′19″W | 386 (117.8) | 30 | 2014 | Office | Was the tallest building in the Washington metropolitan area at the time of completion, overtaking the Rosslyn Twin Towers. |
| 7 | Hilton at The Key | | Rosslyn, VA 38°53′52″N 77°04′23″W | 385 (117.3) | 36 | 2025 | Hotel | Part of The Key. Full service hotel with 331 rooms, 28,000 SF of conference space, and retail. Formerly known as Dittmar Rosslyn Hotel. |
| 8 | Lumen at Tysons | | Tysons, VA 38°55′13″N 77°13′55″W | 384 (117) | 32 | 2019 | Residential | |
| 9 | Rosslyn Twin Tower One | | Rosslyn, VA 38°53′38″N 77°04′08″W | 381 (116.1) | 27 | 1980 | Office | |
| 10 | Rosslyn Twin Tower Two | | Rosslyn, VA 38°53′41″N 77°04′13″W | 381 (116.1) | 26 | 1982 | Office | |
| 11 | One Skyline Tower | | Bailey's Crossroads, VA 38°50′40″N 77°06′59″W | 364 (110.9) | 26 | 1988 | Office | Tallest building in Bailey's Crossroads. |
| 12 | VITA | | Tysons, VA 38°55′11″N 77°13′15″W | 362 (110.3) | 32 | 2014 | Residential | |
| 13 | Adaire | | Tysons, VA 38°55′50″N 77°14′27″W | 360 (109.7) | 34 | 2016 | Residential | |
| 14 | Rise at the Boro | | Tysons, VA 38°55′30″N 77°14′00″W | 360 (109.7) | 33 | 2019 | Residential | |
| 15 | Central Place Residential Tower | | Rosslyn, VA 38°53′48″N 77°04′16″W | 355 (108.2) | 31 | 2017 | Residential | |
| 16 | 1801 North Lynn Street | | Rosslyn, VA 38°53′48″N 77°04′14″W | 344 (105) | 24 | 2002 | Mixed-use | Mixed-use residential and office building. |
| 17 | Nouvelle | | Tysons, VA 38°55′29″N 77°13′08″W | 341 (104) | 27 | 2015 | Residential | |
| 18 | The Wilson | | Bethesda, MD 38°58′55″N 77°05′37″W | 341 (104) | 25 | 2021 | Office | Tallest building in Bethesda, in Montgomery County, and the tallest building in Maryland outside of Baltimore since 2021. Part of the Wilson & The Elm building complex. |
| 19 | Hilton Alexandria Mark Center | | Alexandria, VA 38°49′59″N 77°07′03″W | 338 (103) | 30 | 1985 | Hotel | Tallest building in Alexandria. |
| 20 | George Washington Masonic National Memorial | | Alexandria, VA 38°48′27″N 77°03′58″W | 333 (101.5) | 9 | 1932 | Museum | |
| 21 | The Elm | | Bethesda, MD 38°58′55″N 77°05′39″W | 331 (101) | 29 | 2021 | Residential | Part of the Wilson & The Elm building complex. |
| 22 | Basilica of the National Shrine of the Immaculate Conception | | Washington, D.C. 38°55′58″N 77°00′03″W | 329 (100.3) | 1 | 1959 | Religious | Tallest building in Washington, D.C. since 1959. Tallest building completed in the city in the 1950s. |
| 23 | Marriott International Headquarters | | Bethesda, MD 38°59′16″N 77°05′44″W | 328 (100) (Note: Sources do not state the exact height of this building. This figure was determined using Google Earth by subtracting the altitude of the building entrance from the highest architectural point.) | 22 | 2022 | Office | |
| 24 | Metropolitan Park Building 6 | | Pentagon City, VA 38°51′42″N 77°03′16″W | 325 (99.2) | 23 | 2023 | Office | Part of Amazon HQ2. Joint-tallest building in Pentagon City. |
| 25 | Metropolitan Park Building 7/8 | | Pentagon City, VA 38°51′37″N 77°03′16″W | 325 (99.2) | 23 | 2023 | Office | Part of Amazon HQ2. Joint-tallest building in Pentagon City. |
| 26 | Tysons Tower | | Tysons, VA 38°55′10″N 77°13′11″W | 318 (97) | 22 | 2014 | Office | |
| 27 | Old Post Office | | Washington, D.C. 38°53′39″N 77°01′39″W | 315 (96) | 12 | 1899 | Office | Tallest building completed in Washington in the 19th century. |
| 28 | Turnberry Tower | | Rosslyn, VA 38°53′49″N 77°04′23″W | 313 (95.3) | 27 | 2009 | Residential | |
| 29 | Verse at the Boro | | Tysons, VA 38°55′28″N 77°13′57″W | 310 (94.5) | 25 | 2019 | Residential | |
| 30 | The Mather | | Tysons, VA 38°55′34″N 77°13′16″W | 308 (93.9) | 27 | 2024 | Residential | Two apartment style high-rise buildings for adults 62 and older |
| 31 | Reva | | Crystal City, VA 38°51′23″N 77°02′59″W | 302 (92) (Note: CTBUH lacks information on this building or its height. This figure was determined using Google Earth, as stated in the source.) | 27 | 2024 | Residential | |
| 32 | The Grace | | Crystal City, VA 38°51′26″N 77°02′59″W | 302 (92) | 26 | 2024 | Residential | |
| 33 | Washington National Cathedral | | Washington, D.C. 38°55′50″N 77°04′14″W | 302 (92) | 7 | 1990 | Religious | Tallest structure completed in Washington, D.C. in the 1990s. Construction took place for over 80 years from 1907 to 1990, though the cathedral has been in use since 1912. |
| 34 | Two Waterview Place | | Rosslyn, VA 38°53′50″N 77°04′12″W | 300 (91.4) | 30 | 2007 | Mixed-use | Mixed-use residential and hotel building. |
| 35 | One Waterview Place | | Rosslyn, VA 38°53′52″N 77°04′14″W | 300 (91.4) | 24 | 2008 | Office | Contains retail units. |
| 36 | The Heming | | Tysons, VA 38°55′26″N 77°12′24″W | 300 (91) | 28 | 2023 | Residential | Luxury condominium building with 410 residential units and 40,000 square feet of retail space. |

== Tallest under construction or proposed ==
=== Under construction ===
As of 2026, there are no buildings under construction in the Washington metropolitan area that will be taller than 300 feet (91 m).

=== Proposed ===
The following table ranks approved and proposed skyscrapers in the Washington metropolitan area that are expected to be at least 300 ft (91 m) tall as of 2026, based on standard height measurement. The “Year” column indicates the expected year of completion. A dash “–“ indicates information about the building is unknown or has not been released.

| Name | City | Height ft (m) | Floors | Year | Purpose | Status | Notes |
|---|---|---|---|---|---|---|---|
| The Helix | Pentagon City | 352 (107.4) | 15 | 2027 | Office | Approved | Will be part of Amazon HQ2. |

== Timeline of tallest buildings ==
This table includes buildings that once held the title of tallest building in the Washington metropolitan area. The Washington Monument is excluded, as it is not a habitable building. It has been the tallest structure in the area since its completion in 1884.

| Name | Image | City | Years as tallest | Height ft (m) | Floors | Notes |
|---|---|---|---|---|---|---|
| Old Post Office | | Washington, D.C. | 1899–1932 | 315 (96) | 12 | |
| George Washington Masonic National Memorial | | Alexandria, VA | 1932–1980 | 333 (101.5) | 9 | |
| Rosslyn Twin Tower One | | Rosslyn, VA | 1980–2014 | 381 (116.1) | 27 | Title shared with Rosslyn Twin Tower Two. |
| Rosslyn Twin Tower Two | | Rosslyn, VA | 1982–2014 | 381 (116.1) | 26 | Title shared with Rosslyn Twin Tower One. |
| 1812 N Moore | | Rosslyn, VA | 2014–2018 | 386 (117.8) | 30 | |
| Capital One Tower | | Tysons, VA | 2018–present | 470 (143.3) | 31 | |

== Skylines ==
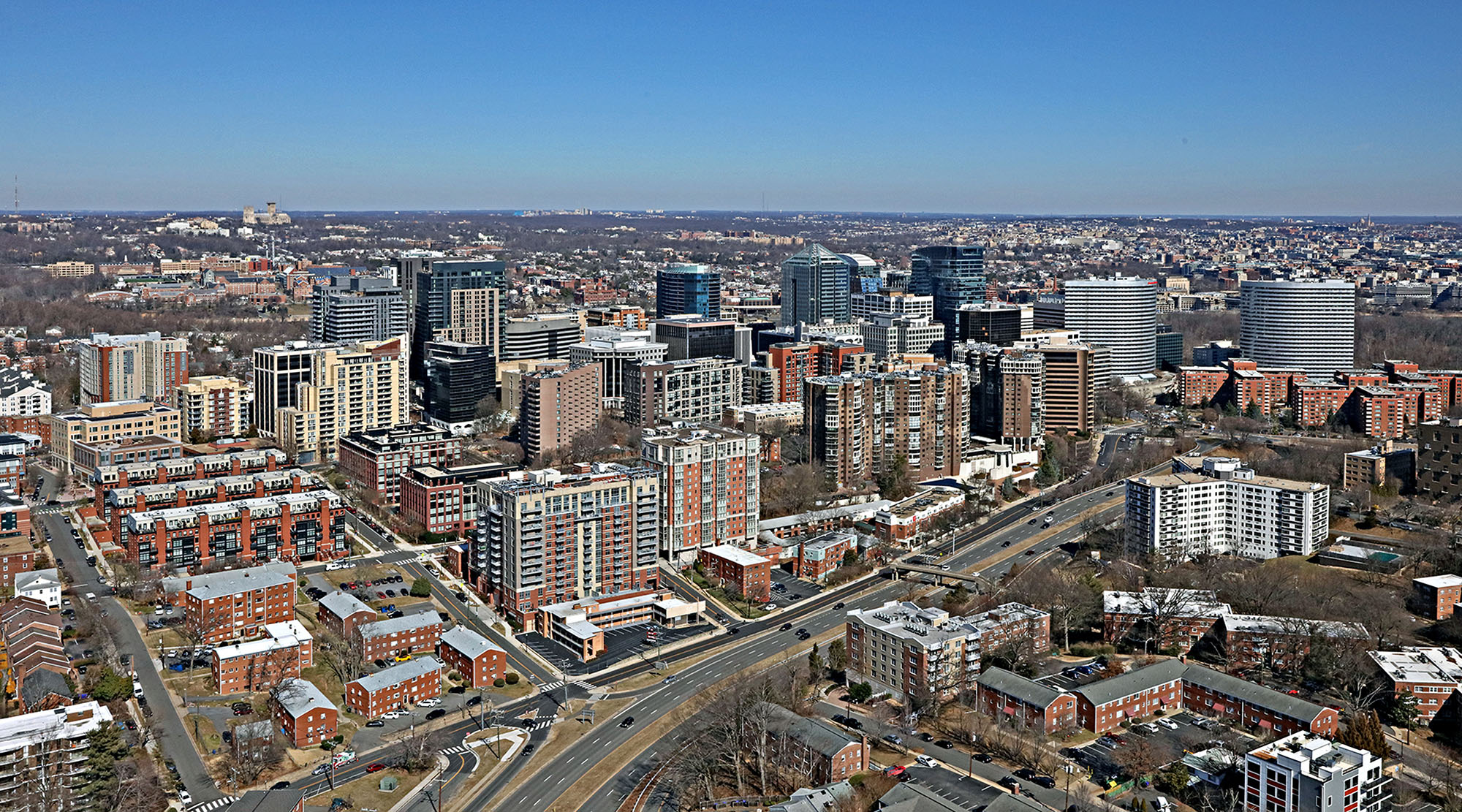
Rosslyn

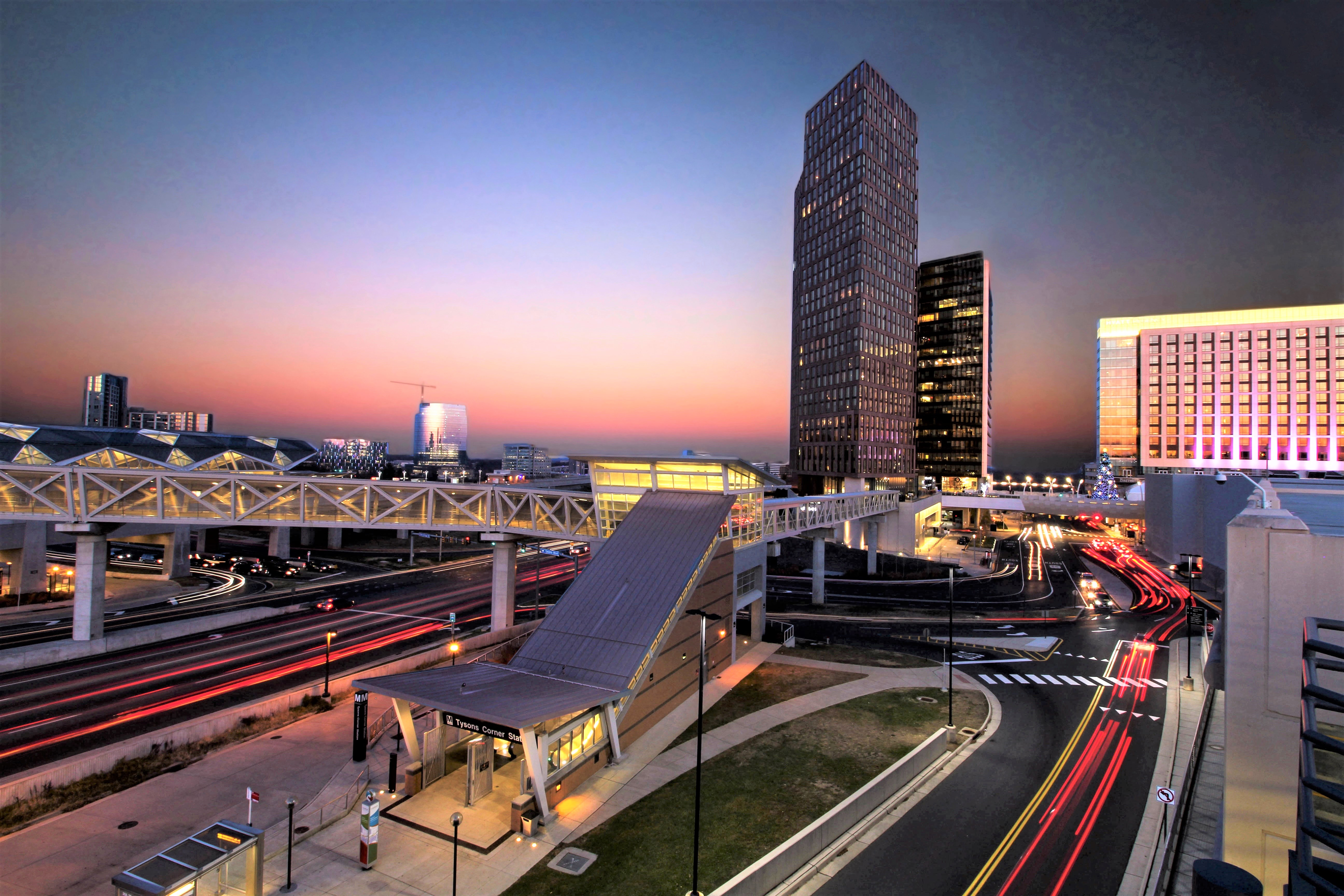
Tysons

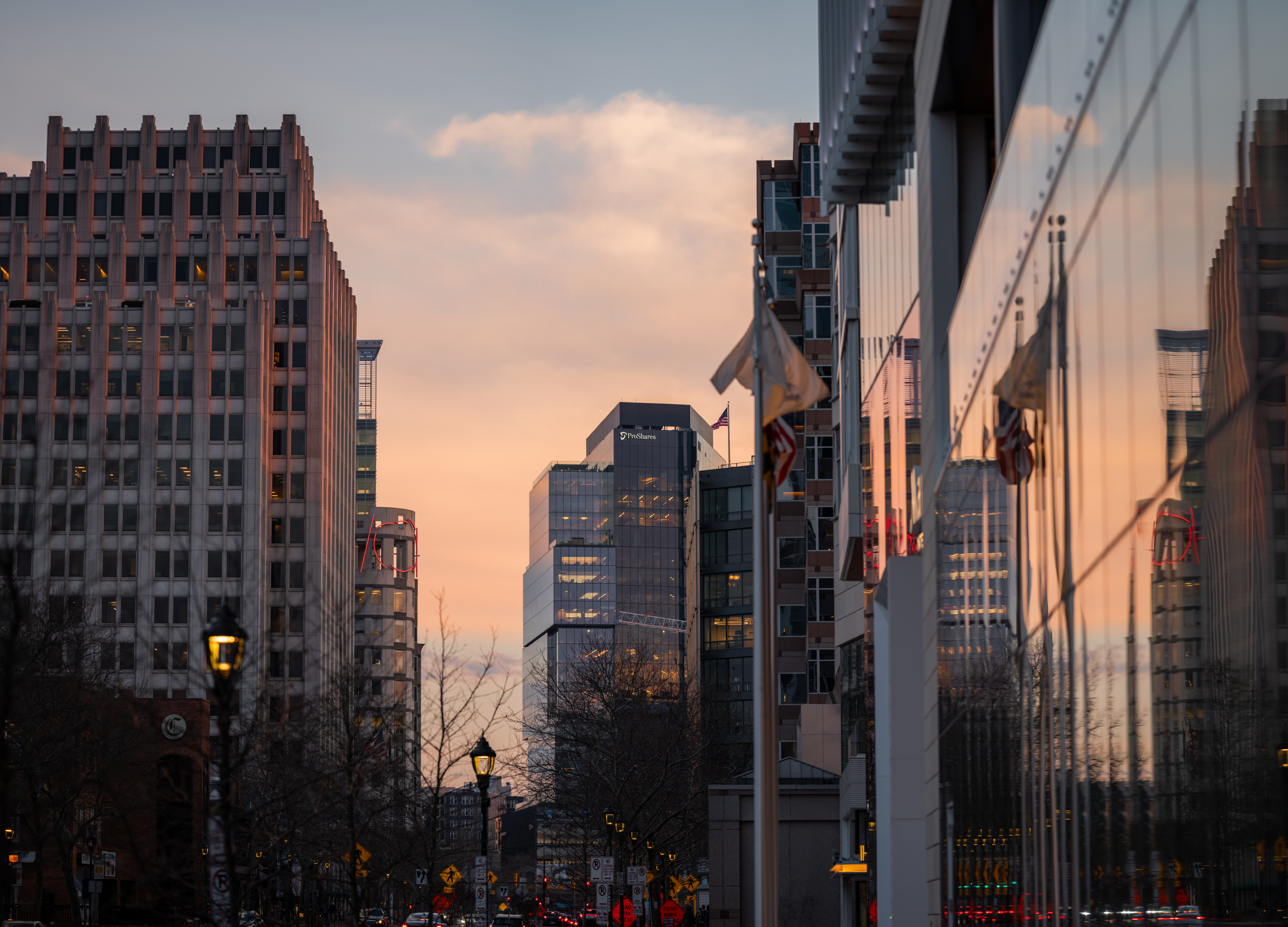
Bethesda

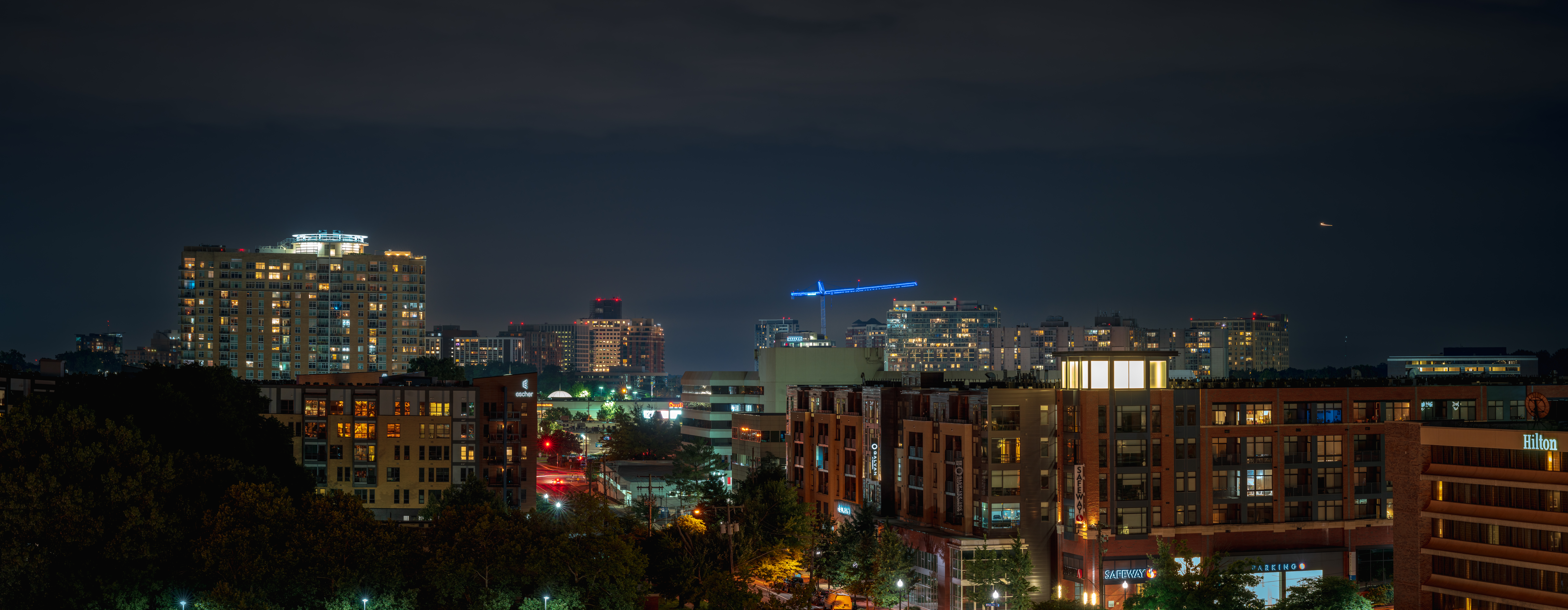
North Bethesda

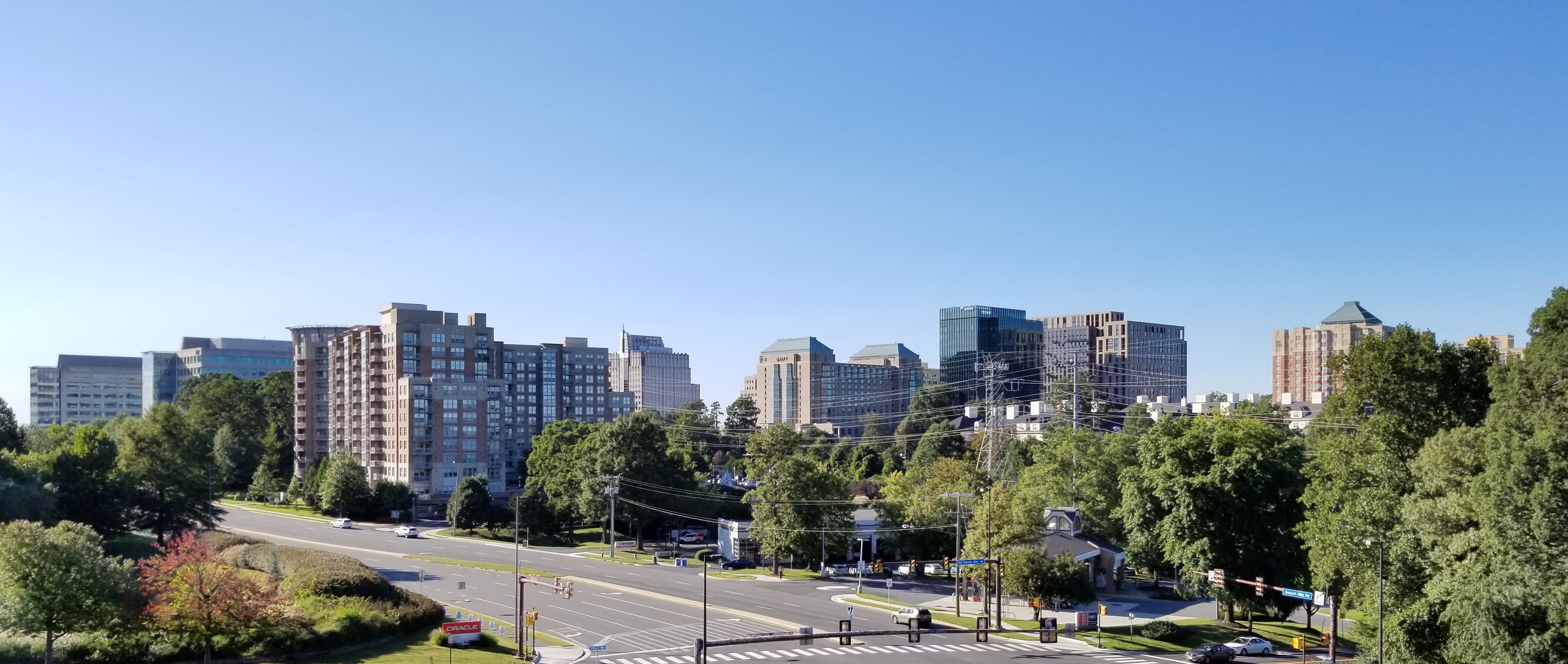
Reston

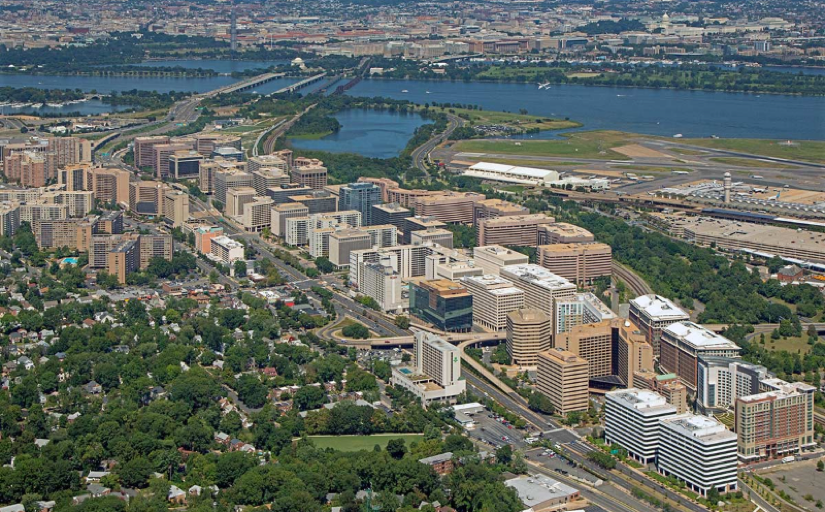
Crystal City

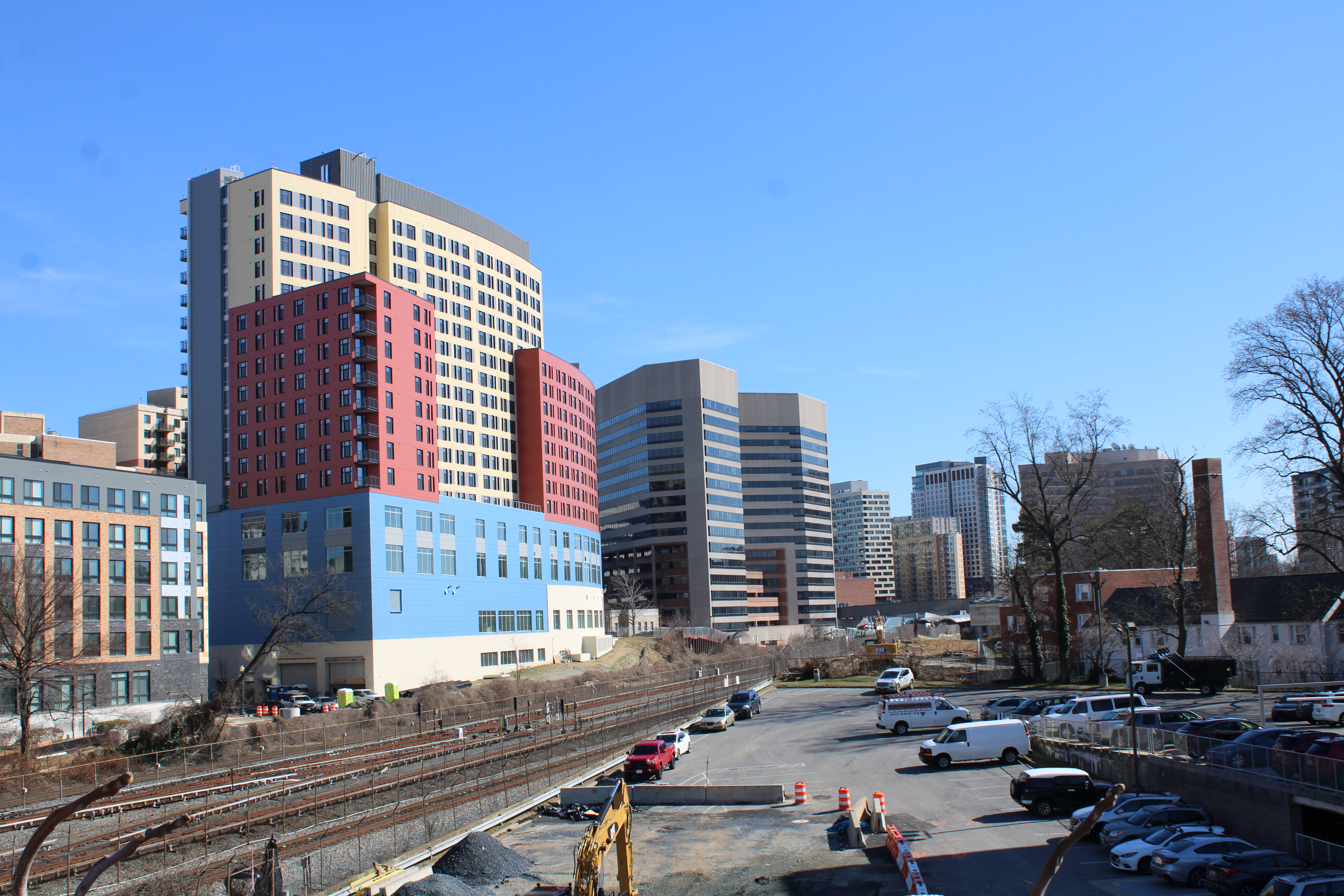
Silver Spring

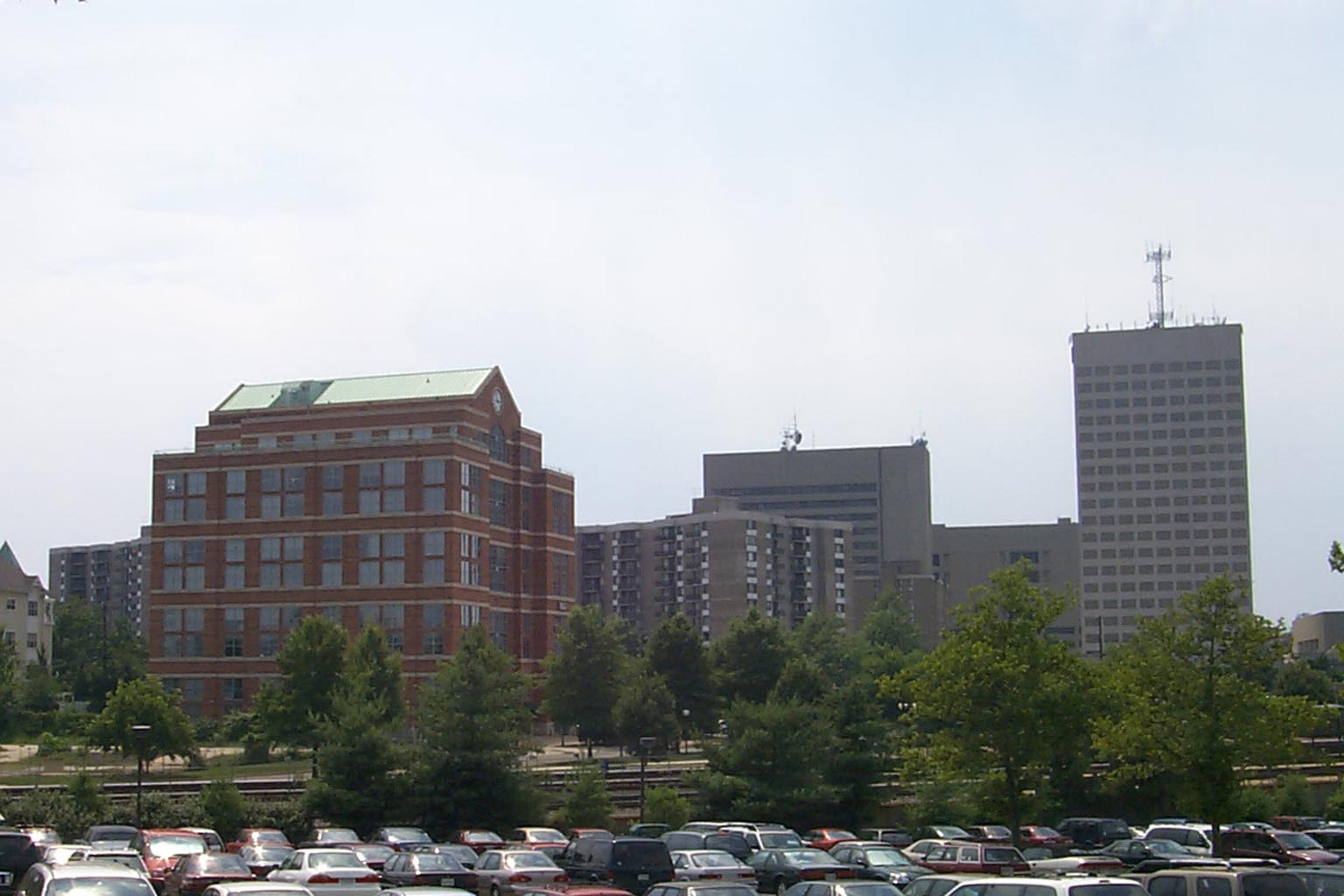
Rockville

== See also ==
- List of tallest buildings in Virginia
- List of tallest buildings in Washington, D.C.
- Architecture of Washington, D.C.
