= Diplomatic Telecommunications Service =

US Department of State system

The Diplomatic Telecommunications Service (DTS) is a system of integrated telecommunications networks that supports foreign affairs agencies in Washington, D.C., and U.S. diplomatic missions abroad. It is administered by the United States Department of State Diplomatic Telecommunications Service Program Office (DTSPO). DTS is a global network of telecommunications sites that is charged with providing a global, reliable, and cost-effective communications network for the U.S. foreign affairs community.

== Relay locations ==
- Beltsville Messaging Center, Beltsville, Maryland (39.0457°N 76.8640°W)
- Brandy Station, Warrenton Training Center, Virginia (38.4591°N 77.8487°W)
- Network Access Point (NAP) of the Americas, Miami, Florida (25.7824°N 80.1931°W)
- United States Embassy, Annex A, RAF Croughton, United Kingdom (51.9880°N 1.1800°W)
- European Communication Research Center, Egelsbach, Germany (50.0036°N 8.6108°E)
- Opana Radar Site, Hawaii (21.6856°N 158.0097°W)
- Naval Air Station Sigonella, Italy (37.4018°N 14.9222°E)
