= Tycon Center =

Coordinates: 38°54′52″N 77°13′10″W

Tycon Center is a development at 8000 Towers Crescent Drive in Vienna, VA, built and initially owned by developers James T. Lewis, Roy Mitchell and Don Moore, known as Tycon Development The complex is also known as Tycon Towers 1 and consists of a postmodern 17-story brick clad building designed by John Burgee Architects with Philip Johnson.

== History ==
The original intent was to build three towers, curved in plan, with curved parking structures behind each one. The developer selected the firm John Burgee Architects with Philip Johnson after seeing their name in a Fortune magazine list of famous architects. Lewis thought that the site's location at the intersection of several highways and its prominent elevation deserved an important architect and he was familiar with some of Johnson's other projects, including Pennzoil Place, PPG Place, and 550 Madison Avenue.

Only the first building of the three proposed was completed as part of the original project.

Construction of the project was completed in 1986. Developer James T. Lewis was forced to sell the property after his business was badly affected during the economic downturn of the early 1990s and the failed efforts to develop PortAmerica (which was later developed as National Harbor, opening its initial phase in 2008). The complex is also known as Tycon Towers 1 and consists of a postmodern 17-story brick clad building designed by John Burgee Architects with Philip Johnson.

== Design ==
The office building is 17 stories, brick on precast panels trimmed with limestone sills, lintels and keystones. The granite clad lobby has a 3-story space. The top level includes a barrel vault skylight across the building's width. The building was designed to attract top tier tenants and includes high end finishes such as doors with only levered handles and no knobs.

Tycon Towers used 4,500 tons of steel and 1.25 million bricks. Of those bricks, 700,000 were special shapes used primarily in building the massive columns.

At the time of its construction it was the only skyscraper in the vicinity and towered over neighboring buildings. Johnson intended the building to be a monument and prominent against its surroundings and accessible only by car. Plans for another two buildings in the complex were inconsistent with Fairfax's master plan for more transit-oriented, pedestrian friendly development.

The building became known locally as "The Shopping Bag" because of its distinctive shape. It has three levels of underground basements totaling 500,000 square feet (46,000 m^{2}).

== Project team ==
- Owner: Tycon Development Corporation
- Engineer: Guido & Fernandez
- Steel Contractor: Glen Construction Company
- Structural Steel and Fabrication: Cives Steel Company
- Architectural Precast: Smith Midland
- Steel Modeling: Mountain Enterprises Mtent Inc.
- Project Manager: Tom Bellingham
- Project Architect: Alan Ford, AIA
- Project Architect for the parking structure: Monty Mitchell
- Project Design: Betsy del Monte
- Brick Supply: Potomac Valley Brick
- Masonry Contractor: United Masonry
- Water treatment: Arc Water Treatment Company

== See also ==
- List of tallest buildings in Tysons, Virginia
