= Organizational structure of the Central Intelligence Agency =

The Central Intelligence Agency (CIA), informally known as "the Agency" or "the Company", is a United States intelligence agency that "provides objective intelligence on foreign countries." The CIA is part of the United States Intelligence Community, and is organized into numerous organizational subdivisions including Directorates, (Note: A "Directorate" within the CIA is an top-level organization headed by a deputy director.) Centers, (Note: A "Center" or "Mission Center" in the CIA is a crossfunctional level of organization. The CIA is divided into five major directorates, and several functionally oriented centers including the Special Activities Center. The major difference between a Directorate and Centers within the CIA is that the centers bring together people from all five CIA directorates and include officers from other intelligence agencies.) Staffs, (Note: A "Staff" in the CIA is an organizational entity within a Directorate that is responsible for staff and administrative work.) Divisions, (Note: A "Division" within the CIA is an organizational level that is subordinate to a Directorate; historically Divisions were the primary operating entities within the Directorate of Operations/Clandestine Service. The term was also used within the Directorate of Intelligence as a subdivision of Offices. It has also been inconsistently applied to other units, such as the unit responsible for contacting US citizens to collect foreign intelligence from them has at various times been an Office, a Service, and currently a Division.) Groups, (Note: A "Group" within the CIA is an organizational level that is subordinate to a Division or Center. Groups consist of "Branches", typically sharing similar functional, geographic, or close organizational links.) Offices, (Note: A "Office" in the CIA is an organizational entity within a Directorate; Offices historically represented the major components within the Directorates of Intelligence (where they were further subdivided into Divisions), Support, and Science & Technology.) and Branches. (Note: A "Branch" within the CIA is an organizational level subordinate to either a transnational or regional Group; historically some Divisions within the Clandestine Service were also subdivided directly into Branches.) It is overseen by the Director of Central Intelligence; and is divided into five major Directorates, supported by several offices of staff, and 11 Mission Centers. As of June 2025, the directorates are:

- Directorate of Analysis
- Directorate of Operations
- Directorate of Science and Technology
- Directorate of Digital Innovation
- Directorate of Support

== Organizational Charts ==
The CIA periodically publishes organizational charts of its agency. Here are a few examples.

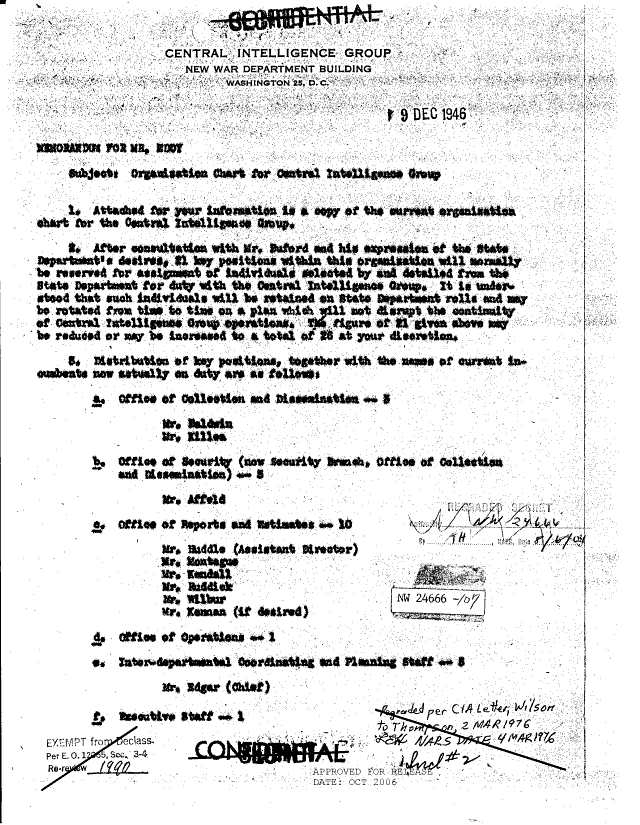
1946 (CIG)

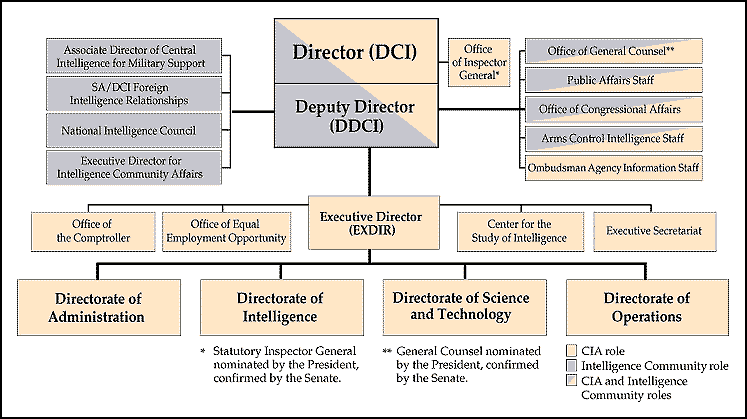
1997

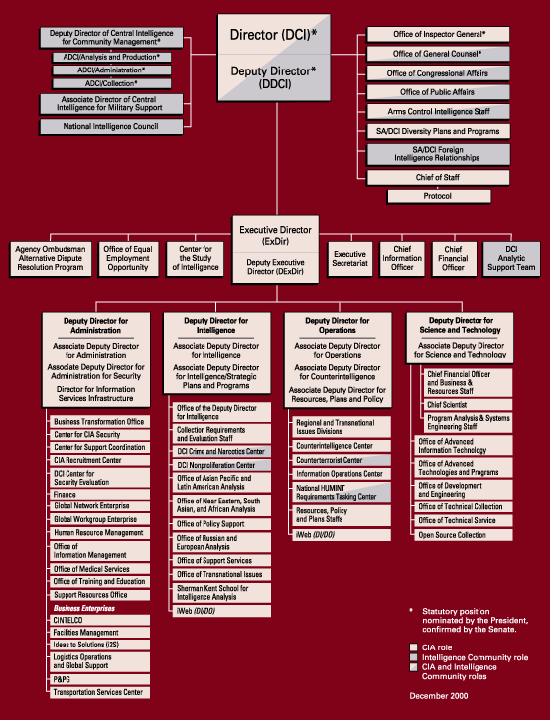
Dec 2000
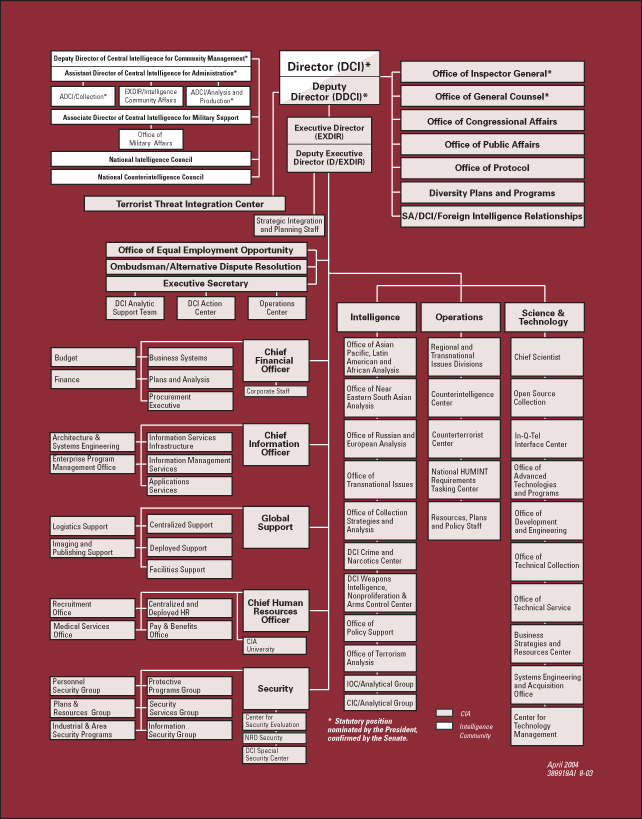
Apr 2004

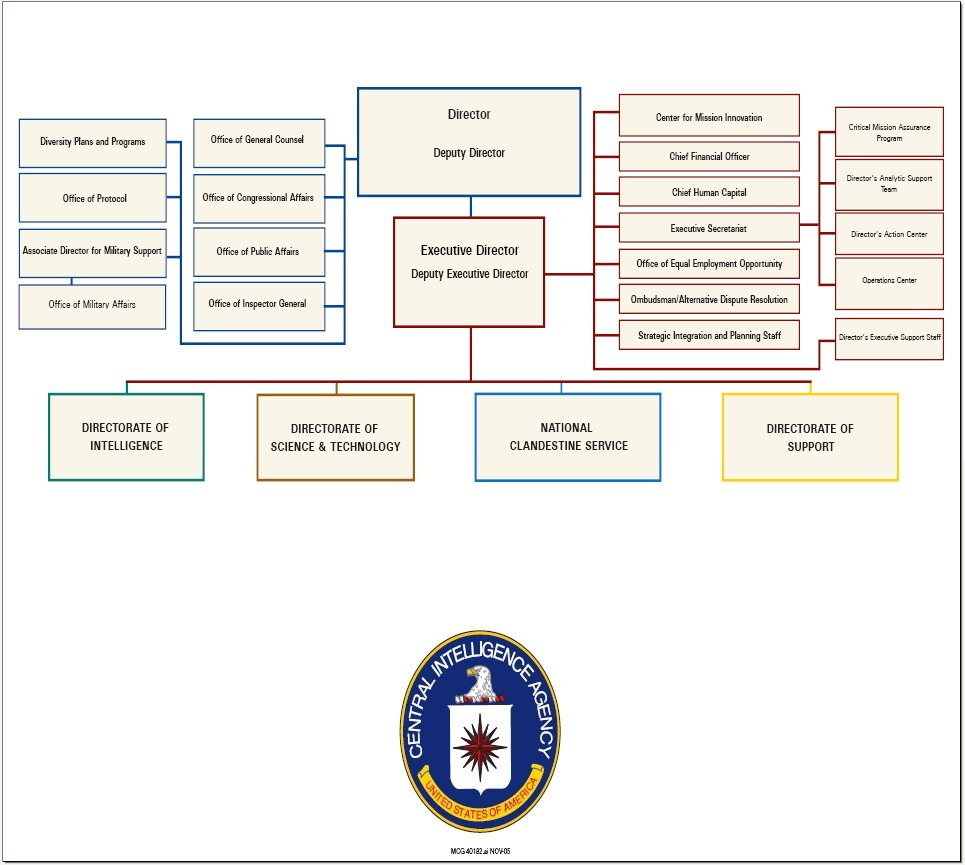
Nov 2005

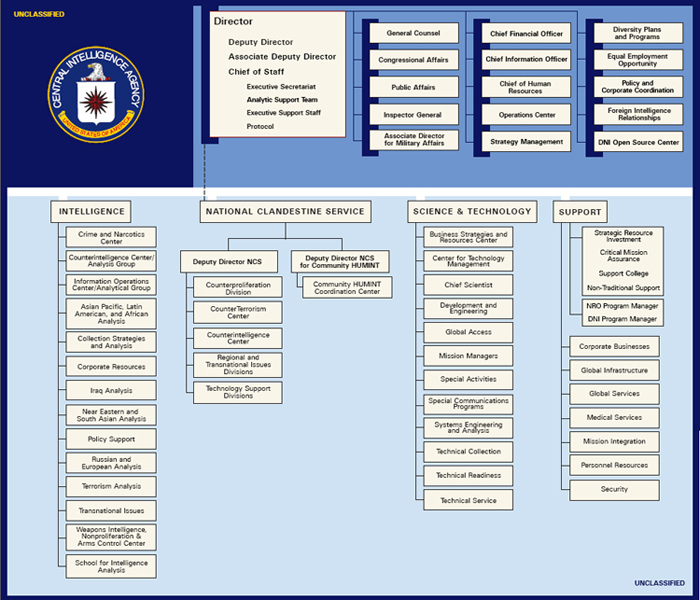
May 2009

== Executive offices ==
Previously, the Director of Central Intelligence (DCI) oversaw the Intelligence Community (IC), serving as the president's principal intelligence advisor, additionally serving as head of the Central Intelligence Agency. The Intelligence Reform and Terrorism Prevention Act of 2004 amended the National Security Act to provide for a Director of National Intelligence who would assume some of the roles formerly fulfilled by the DCI, with a separate Director of the Central Intelligence Agency. The DCI's title now is "Director of the Central Intelligence Agency" (DCIA), serving as head of the CIA.

Currently, the Central Intelligence Agency answers directly to the Director of National Intelligence, although the CIA Director may brief the President directly. The CIA has its budget approved by the US Congress, a subcommittee of which see the line items. The intelligence community, however, does not take direct orders from the Congress. The National Security Advisor is a permanent member of the National Security Council, responsible for briefing the President with pertinent information collected by all 16 US Intelligence Community agencies are under the policy, but not necessarily budgetary, authority of the Director of National Intelligence.

The effect of the personalities of the DCIs on the structure and behavior of the Agency and indeed the IC is analyzed in Painter's dissertation on "Early Leader Effects" of Donovan, Dulles and Hoover.

Until the creation of the Office of the Director of National Intelligence, the director of the CIA met regularly with the president to issue daily reports on ongoing operations. After the creation of the post of DNI, currently Tulsi Gabbard, the report is now given by the DNI, who oversees all US intelligence activities, including intelligence community operations outside of CIA jurisdiction. Former CIA Director Porter Goss, who had been a CIA officer, denied this has had a diminishing effect on morale, but promoted his mission to reform the CIA into the lean and agile "counter-terrorism"-focused force he believes it should be.

The Deputy Director of the CIA (DDCIA) assists the director in his or her duties as head of the CIA and exercises the powers of the director when the director's position is vacant or in the director's absence or disability. Either the director or deputy director may be a military officer, but both positions may not be filled, at the same time, by military officers.

The third-highest office and highest non-political office of the CIA, which manages day-to-day operations and budget, was known as Executive Director from July 5, 2006, also as Associate Deputy Director (ADD) and was renamed Chief Operating Officer (COO) of the CIA in 2017.

=== Relationship with Congress ===
There have been various arrangements to handle the CIA's relationship with Congress. It began with a single position named the "legislative liaison" which later became the "legislative counsel". Eventually it became an office. In the 1970s, Congressional inquiries demanded a great increase in staffing and a reorganization. In the 1980s, several more reorganizations and renamings followed. Near the end of the 1980s, the office was named the Office of Congressional Affairs and as of 2009, has kept that name. See also CIA Office of Congressional Affairs

=== Support to the military ===
As the DCIA's principal adviser and representative on military issues, the Associate Director for Military Support (AD/MS), a senior general officer, coordinates CIA efforts to provide Joint Force commanders, who are principally consumers of national-level intelligence but producers of operational intelligence. The AD/MS also supports Department of Defense officials who oversee military intelligence training and the acquisition of intelligence systems and technology. John A. Gordon was the first AD/MS, before the creation of ODNI. There is also an Associate Deputy Director for Operations for Military Affairs (ADDO/MA)

The Office of Military Affairs provides intelligence and operational support to the US armed forces.

=== Covert Action Authorities ===
President George W. Bush, in creating the National Clandestine Service (NCS), set a clear policy that the CIA would be in charge of all human intelligence (HUMINT) operations. NCS (formerly the Directorate of Operations, and earlier the "Directorate of Plans"), performs clandestine human intelligence collection, and conducts deniable psychological operations (psyops) and paramilitary operations.

Special Activities Center (SAC) is the NCS's unit responsible for Covert Action and "Special Activities". These special activities include the covert political influence and paramilitary operations. Special Operations Group (SOG) is the element within SAC responsible for paramilitary operations. They recruit solely from the Joint Special Operations Command and are then trained through an extensive course to become a clandestine intelligence officer. This unit is the most secretive and one of the most elite special operations forces in the world.

Covert Action authorities come from the National Security Act of 1947. President Ronald Reagan issued Executive Order 12333 titled "United States Intelligence Activities" in 1984. This order defined covert action as both political and military activities that the US Government could legally deny and granted them exclusively to the CIA. The CIA was also designated as the sole authority under the 1991 Intelligence Authorization Act and mirrored in Title 50 of the United States Code Section 413(e).

The Pentagon commissioned a study to determine whether the CIA or the Department of Defense (DoD) should conduct covert action paramilitary operations. Their study determined that the CIA should maintain this capability and be the sole government agency conducting covert action. The DoD found that it does not have the legal authority to conduct covert action nor the agility to carry out these types of missions.

=== Proposed support to Homeland Security ===
A great sensitivity remains about the CIA having domestic responsibilities, but it clearly will, on occasions, collect information outside the US that relates directly to domestic security. The CIA, for example, is more likely to obtain HUMINT on terrorists than the very limited foreign resources of the Department of Homeland Security (DHS) or the Federal Bureau of Investigation (FBI).

The DHS, like the military, is seen principally as a consumer of national intelligence, but its border and transportation security functions also produce intelligence. At present, however, there is no well-defined way for DHS to task intelligence collection agencies with its requirements. One proposal suggests using the AD/MS as a prototype, to create an AD/Homeland Security in the CIA, and possibly an equivalent position in the U.S. Justice Department, which, through the FBI and other agencies, legally collects domestic intelligence. This proposal is one of many to improve coordination and avoid intelligence failures caused by not "connecting the dots", when the dots are held by different agencies.

== National estimates ==
Prior to 2004, CIA had two analytic roles: the main effort based in the Directorate of Intelligence, which used internal experts to analyze data collected by CIA, National Reconnaissance Office (NRO), the military collection organizations, and other parts of the intelligence community. Many of these reports were on current subjects, such as the status of a revolutionary group, or the technical details of a new Chinese factory.

Another function, however, was preparing "estimates", which try to predict the future. Estimates are a product of the intelligence community as a whole. National Intelligence Estimates were the most extensively coordinated documents, often that could be scheduled on a regular basis, such as a regular report on Soviet intentions. Special National Intelligence Estimates (SNIE) were quick-response publications, often providing guidance in a crisis, but were still interagency consensus rather than CIA alone.

CIA had a separate and prestigious office, going by different names and organizations, such as the Office of National Estimates, Board of National Estimates, or a set of National Intelligence Officers, which would seek out the consensus of all the intelligence agencies, and then have some of the most senior analysts write a draft. The idea of such estimates is often credited to Sherman Kent, sometimes called the father of US intelligence analysis, with special emphasis on the production of estimates. This function is now in the National Intelligence Council of the Office of the Director of National Intelligence. Originally defined in 1950, this responsibility stated "CIA is now in the business of producing what are called National Intelligence Estimates (NIE) along the lines laid down in NSC 50. These papers are interdepartmental in character, designed to focus all available intelligence on a problem of importance to the national security." In the early days of the process, CIA used the State Department's intelligence staff for drafting the NIEs, but a "small top level Office of National Estimates" was set up to integrate the departmental drafts. A senior CIA analyst responsible for the document would work out differences. There is also a process by which an agency can disagree with a comment called a "reclama", which is a footnote expressing an alternate position. For an example of such dissents, see Special National Intelligence Estimate 10–9–65, where there are dissents to various parts from all or part of the military, and from the Department of State.

Upon approval by an interagency review committee, the paper becomes a NIE and is sent by the Director of Central Intelligence to the President, appropriate officers of Cabinet level, and the NSC.

== Directorate of Science and Technology ==
The Directorate of Science & Technology researches and applies innovative technology in support of the intelligence collection mission. The CIA has always been invested in harnessing scientific and technological advances to enhance its capabilities. The interest in technology originated with two main aims during the Cold War: firstly, to harness these techniques for its own use, and secondly, to match and counter any new technologies the Soviet Union might develop. This effort gained impetus in the fifties when the USSR took the US by surprise, launching the Sputnik satellite and triggering the start of the Space Race. The agency is also extremely interested in computer and information technology. In 1999, the CIA created the venture capital firm In-Q-Tel to help fund and develop technologies of interest to the agency.

Its website mentions its priorities being in:

- Application Software and Analytics
- Bio, Nuclear, and Chemical Technologies
- Communications and Infrastructure
- Digital Identity and Security
- Embedded Systems and Power

In January 2008, it featured a collaboration with Streambase Systems, makers of a "high-performance Complex event processing (CEP) software platform for real-time and historical analysis of high-volume intelligence data", using a new processing paradigm for Structured Query Language (SQL). This allows queries against multiple real-time data streams still updating the data base.

== Directorate of Operations ==
The Directorate of Operations (formerly the National Clandestine Service) is responsible for collecting foreign intelligence, mainly from clandestine HUMINT sources, and covert action. The name reflects its role as the coordinator of human intelligence activities among other elements of the wider U.S. intelligence community with their own HUMINT operations. The Directorate of Operations was created in an attempt to end years of rivalry over influence, philosophy and budget between the United States Department of Defense (DOD) and the CIA. In spite of this, the Department of Defense recently organized its own global clandestine intelligence service, the Defense Clandestine Service (DCS), under the Defense Intelligence Agency (DIA).

The precise present organization of this Directorate is classified.

It is responsible for collection of foreign intelligence, principally from clandestine HUMINT sources, and covert action. The new name reflects its role as the coordinator of all human intelligence activities among various elements of the wider U.S. intelligence community. Note that there is an open source function in the office of the Director of National Intelligence, which may be taking over certain legal interviews in the US that previously were the Domestic Contact Division (or Domestic Contact Service).

While the NCS organization chart has not been published, although there have been prior descriptions of the Directorate of Plans or the Directorate of Operations, a fairly recent organization chart of the Defense Clandestine Service will indicate functions transferred into the NCS, and may well be fairly close to the overall NCS organizational structure.

The Special Activities Center (SAC) is a division of the Central Intelligence Agency's National Clandestine Service, responsible for covert action paramilitary operations, the collection of intelligence in hostile and/or denied areas and all high threat military and/or intelligence operations when the US government does not wish to be overtly associated with such activities. As such, members of the unit, when on missions, normally do not carry any objects or clothing (e.g., military uniforms) that would associate them with the United States. If compromised during a mission, the government of the United States may legally deny their status and all knowledge of their mission. SAC officers are a majority of the recipients of the coveted Distinguished Intelligence Cross and the Intelligence Star. These are the two highest medals for valor in the CIA. Not surprisingly, SAC officers also make up the majority of those memorialized on the Wall of Honor at CIA headquarters. These Paramilitary Operations Officers were the spearhead of the invasions of Afghanistan and Iraq.

There are references to earlier structures in various historical documents. For example, in a CIA paper on the internal probe into the Bay of Pigs Invasion, there are several comments on the Directorate of Plans organizational structure in 1962. Even though any large organization will constantly reorganize, the basic functions will stay and can be a clue to future organization.

At the top level, Deputy Director for Plans Richard Bissell had two Assistant Deputy Directors, C. Tracy Barnes and Richard Helms. Warner explains "operational details fell to Branch 4 (Cuba) of the DDP's Western Hemisphere Division (WH)", with some exceptions. Jacob Esterline, chief of the Cuba Branch, reported directly to Bissell and Barnes rather than to his division chief, J.C. King "although King was regularly informed and often consulted. To confuse matters still further, Branch 4 had no direct control over the Brigade's aircraft, which were managed by a separate DDP division that also took some orders directly from Deputy Director of Central Intelligence (DDCI) Charles P. Cabell, a US Air Force general who liked to keep his hand in the planning of airdrops and other missions." Air operations, therefore, were in a separate division either for covert support, paramilitary operations, or both.

Cuba Branch had a "Foreign Intelligence Section", foreign intelligence being a term of art for HUMINT. The branch, however, established a separate 'G-2' unit, subordinate to its Paramilitary Section, which planned the actual invasion. This gives us the model of a geographic branch with subordinate sections, at least, for intelligence collection and paramilitary actions.

Warner's paper also mentions that certain DDP groups were outside the scope of the post-mortem by Executive Director Lyman Kirkpatrick, but their mention tells us that these were representative components of the DDP: "... the Havana station or the Santiago base, the development of foreign intelligence assets and liaison contacts, Division D's technical collection programs, or counter-intelligence work against the Cuban services." CIA "stations" are the parts of the embassy with officers under diplomatic cover, in a typical diplomatic office building. "Bases", however, are large facilities for supporting operations, typically with an airfield, secure warehouses, barracks and training areas. Division D was the joint CIA-NSA collection effort, where CIA would use clandestine operations personnel to emplace NSA SIGINT sensors. The reference to counter-intelligence work appears to refer to a main counterintelligence division, presumably the Counterintelligence Staff under James Jesus Angleton.

== Directorate of Analysis ==
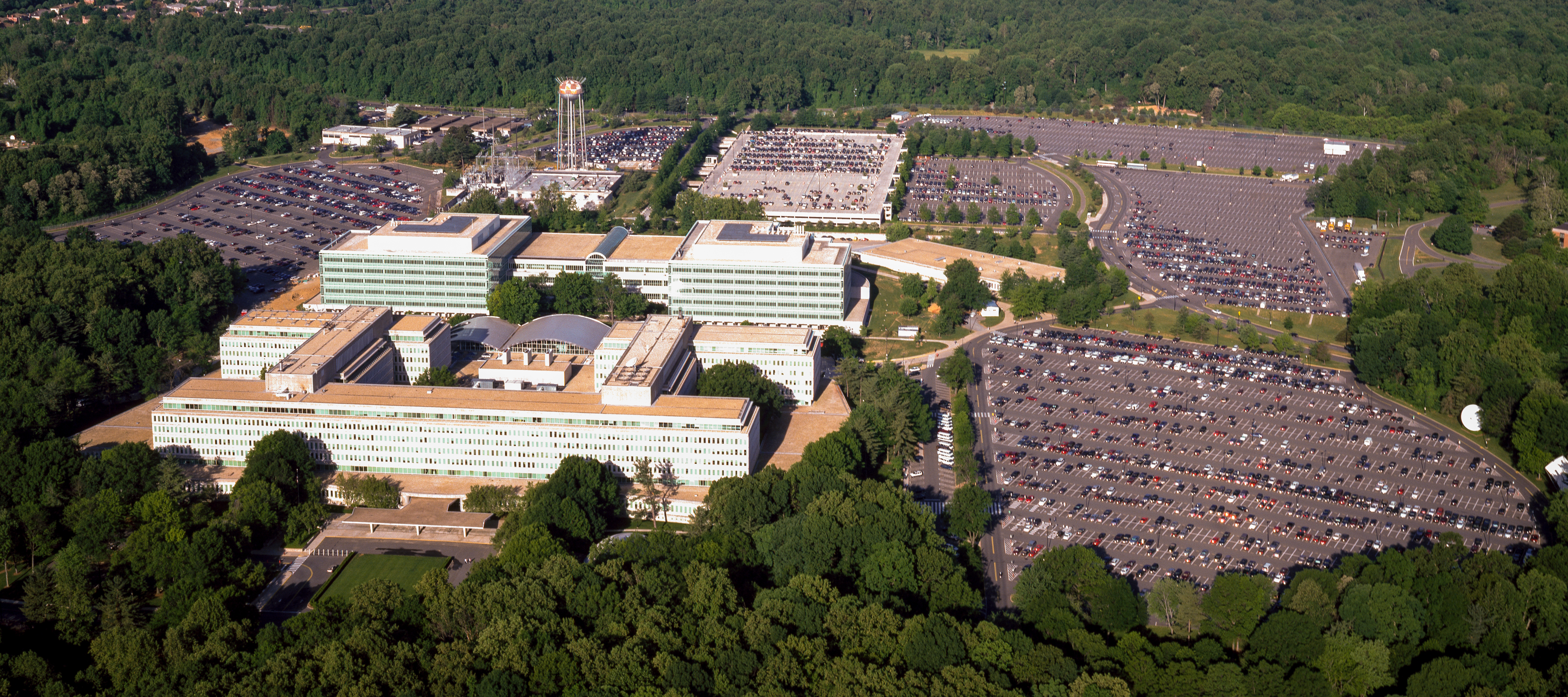
Aerial view of the Central Intelligence Agency headquarters, Langley, Virginia

The Directorate of Analysis (formerly the Directorate of Intelligence) is the analytical branch of the CIA, responsible for the production and dissemination of all-source analysis on key foreign issues relating. It has four regional analytic groups, six groups for transnational issues, and two support units. Prior to the formation of the office of the Director of National Intelligence, the President's Daily Brief was prepared by the CIA Office of Current Intelligence.

Some open source intelligence (OSINT), such as the Foreign Broadcast Information Service, were, at different times, part of the Directorate of Intelligence or the Directorate of Science & Technology. Along with other OSINT functions, the National Open Source Enterprise is now in the ODNI.

=== Regional groups ===
- The Office of Middle East and North Africa Analysis (MENA)
- The Office of South Asia Analysis (OSA)
- The Office of Iraq Analysis
- The Office of Russian and European Analysis (OREA)
- The Office of Asian Pacific, Latin American and African Analysis (APLAA)

=== Transnational groups ===
The Office of Terrorism Analysis supports the National Counterterrorism Center in the Office of the Director of National Intelligence. See CIA transnational anti-terrorism activities.

The Office of Transnational Issues applies unique functional expertise to assesses perceived existing and emerging threats to US national security and provides senior policymakers, military planners, and law enforcement with analysis, warning, and crisis support.

The CIA Crime and Narcotics Center researches information on international narcotics trafficking and organized crime for policymakers and the law enforcement community. As the CIA has no legal domestic police authority, it sends its analytic information to the FBI and other law enforcement organizations, such as the Drug Enforcement Administration (DEA) and the Bureau of Alcohol, Tobacco, and Firearms.

The Weapons Intelligence, Nonproliferation, and Arms Control Center provides intelligence support related to national and non-national threats, as well as supporting threat reduction and arms control. It receives the output of national technical means of verification and works with the Defense Threat Reduction Agency.

The Counterintelligence Center Analysis Group identifies, monitors, and analyzes the efforts of foreign intelligence entities, both national and non-national, against US government interests. It works with FBI personnel in the National Counterintelligence Executive of the Director of National Intelligence.

The Information Operations Center Analysis Group. deals with threats to US computer systems. This unit supports DNI activities and evaluates foreign threats to US computer systems, particularly those that support critical infrastructures. It works with critical infrastructure protection organizations in the United States Department of Defense (e.g., CERT Coordination Center) and the Department of Homeland Security (e.g., United States Computer Emergency Readiness Team).

=== Support and general units ===
The Office of Collection Strategies and Analysis provides comprehensive intelligence collection expertise to the Directorate of Intelligence, to senior Agency and Intelligence Community officials, and to key national policymakers.

The Office of Policy Support customizes Directorate of Analysis products and presents it to a wide variety of policy, law enforcement, military, and foreign liaison recipients.

== Directorate of Support ==
The Directorate of Support provides necessary "housekeeping" administration functions, but in a manner consistent with the need to keep their details protected. These functions include personnel, security, communications, and financial operations. Most of this Directorate is sub-structured into smaller offices based on role and purpose, such as the Office of Security, which is concerned both with personnel and physical security. Other major offices include the Office of Communications and the Office of Information Technology.

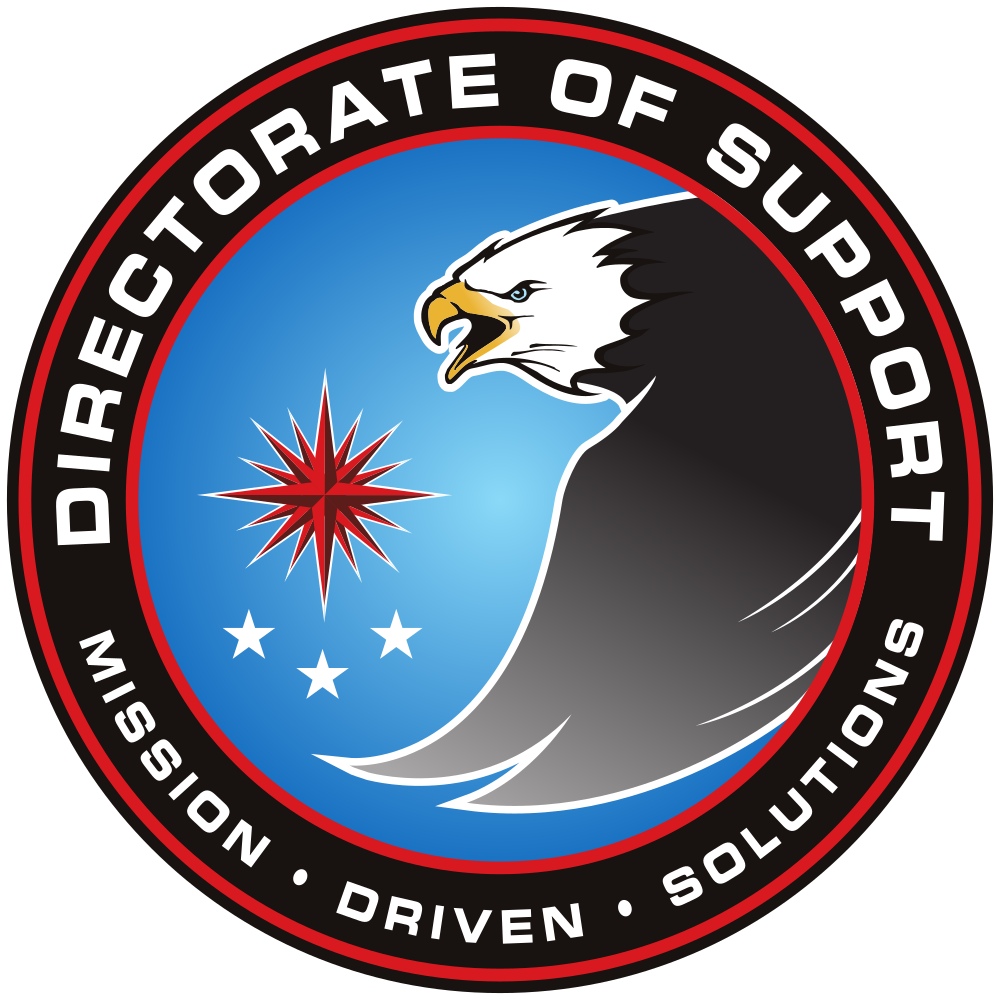
Official Seal of Directorate of Support

=== Logistics and proprietaries ===
Under the original NSC 10/2 authorization, CIA was made responsible not just for covert action during the cold war, but for such action during major wars, in collaboration with the Joint Chiefs of Staff. When DCI Smith created the Directorate of Plans and ended the autonomy of the OPC and OSO, he recognized it was necessary to establish logistical support for these operations before the start of a hot war. Smith did not want to duplicate existing military support systems, and proposed, in 1952, that the CIA should be able to draw, on a reimbursable basis, on military supply stocks. In many respects, this was the beginning of the idea that what was to become the Directorate of Support had a far wider scope than the OSS and initial CIA term, Directorate of Administration.

Smith presented the concept that the CIA would need a worldwide system of support bases, which usually could be tenant organizations on military bases. According to Smith's memo,

A major logistical support base will consist of a CIA base headquarters, training, communications, medical accommodation for evacuees and storage for six months' hot war requirements as well as provide logistical support for CIA operational groups or headquarters ... Informal planning along the lines indicated has been carried out by elements of CIA with ... the Joint Chiefs of Staff ...

The CIA was expected to reimburse "extraordinary expenses" incurred by the military services.

While military transportation might be appropriate for some purposes, there would be cases where the arrival of a military aircraft at a location other than a military base might draw undue attention. This was the origin of the idea of the CIA operating proprietary airlines, whose relationship to the US government would not be public. Among these organizations were airlines that provided covert logistical support, such as Civil Air Transport, Southern Air Transport, and consolidated them into Air America. The latter was heavily involved in support with the war in Cambodia, Laos, and Vietnam in the 1960s.

=== Training ===
This directorate includes the Office of Training, which starts with a Junior Officer Training program for new employees. So that the initial course might be taken by employees who had not received final security clearance and thus were not permitted unescorted access to the Headquarters building, a good deal of basic training has been given at office buildings in the urban areas of Arlington, Virginia.

It is known, although not acknowledged by the US Government, that the CIA runs at least two operations training facilities. One is known as The Farm, at Camp Peary, Virginia. The other is known as The Point at Harvey Point, North Carolina. While the course outline has never been revealed, it is believed to include such things as surveillance, countersurveillance, cryptography, paramilitary training as well as other tradecraft. The course is believed to be slightly less than a year and runs at irregular intervals depending on circumstances. Operations training is delivered by experienced operations officers.

Student progress is monitored by experienced evaluators who meet to discuss a recruit's progress and who have the power to dismiss a recruit even before his or her training is complete. Evaluation techniques for the CIA's World War II predecessor, the OSS, were published as the book Assessment of Men, Selection of Personnel for the office of Strategic Services. (See Roger Hall's You're Stepping on My Cloak and Dagger for an amusing but accurate account of Hall's OSS duty, which included finding unexpected solutions to things in the assessment process as well as his experience in real operations.)

Psychological stress is part of operations training, but of a different type than military special operations force evaluation, such as the Navy SEAL Basic Underwater Demolition/SEAL course or Army Special Forces Assessment and Selection. For instance, an operations training officer will often lie to a recruit saying they have evidence that will result in the recruit to be arrested and tried for felony crimes. This is a test of the recruit's ability to maintain a cover under stress.

- Contrary to popular belief or what is seen in film and television series, US-born, professional employees trained to work as Intelligence Officers for the National Clandestine Service (CIA) are never referred to as "secret agents", "spies", "agents" or "special agents", they are known as 'Operations Officers' or 'Case Officers', or Officer for short. To highlight this point: within the intelligence community, the equivalent of an FBI Special Agent is a CIA Officer. Within the law enforcement community, the equivalent of a CIA "agent" is an FBI informant. There does not exist any working title or job position known as 'CIA Agent', agents or "assets" of the CIA are usually foreigners who pass along secret information to the government through CIA Case Officers, who are posted at US embassies worldwide.

These CIA Case Officers recruit foreign agents, known as 'assets', to give information to the CIA. There are a wide range of motivations for a person to become an asset; CIA Case Officers are normally sent abroad under a cover identity, most commonly as a diplomat but sometimes under "nonofficial cover" using an assumed identity and having no immunity.

== Other offices ==
=== General Publications ===
One of the CIA's best-known publications, The World Factbook, is in the public domain and is made freely available without copyright restrictions because it is a work of the United States federal government. On February 4, 2026, the CIA announced that The World Factbook was discontinued.

CIA's Center for the Study of Intelligence maintains the Agency's historical materials and promotes the study of intelligence as a legitimate and serious discipline. The CIA since 1955 has published an in-house professional journal known as Studies in Intelligence that addresses historical, operational, doctrinal, and theoretical aspects of the intelligence profession. The Center also publishes unclassified and declassified Studies articles, as well as other books and monographs. A further annotated collection of Studies articles was published through Yale University Press under the title Inside CIA's Private World: Declassified Articles from the Agency's Internal Journal, 1955–1992.

In 2002, CIA's Sherman Kent School for Intelligence Analysis began publishing the unclassified Kent Center Occasional Papers, aiming to offer "an opportunity for intelligence professionals and interested colleagues – in an unofficial and unfettered vehicle – to debate and advance the theory and practice of intelligence analysis."

=== General Counsel ===
Two offices advise the Director on legality and proper operations. The Office of the General Counsel advises the Director of the Central Intelligence Agency on all legal matters relating to his or her role as CIA director and is the principal source of legal counsel for the CIA.

=== Inspector General ===
The Office of Inspector General promotes efficiency, effectiveness, and accountability in the administration of Agency activities. The OIG also seeks to prevent and detect fraud, waste, abuse, and mismanagement. The Inspector General is nominated by the President and confirmed by the Senate. The Inspector General, whose activities are independent of those of any other component in the Agency, reports directly to the Director of the Central Intelligence Agency. The OIG conducts inspections, investigations, and audits at Headquarters and in the field, and oversees the Agency-wide grievance-handling system. The OIG provides a semiannual report to the Director of the Central Intelligence Agency which the Director is required by law to submit to the House and Senate Intelligence Committees of Congress within 30 days.

In February 2008, the Director of the Central Intelligence Agency, Michael V. Hayden, sent a message to employees that Inspector General John L. Helgerson will accept increased control over the investigations by that office, saying "John has chosen to take a number of steps to heighten the efficiency, assure the quality and increase the transparency of the investigation process". The Washington Post suggested this was a response to senior officials who believe the OIG has been too aggressive in looking into counterterrorism programs, including detention programs. The changes were the result of an investigation, begun in April 2007, by one of Hayden's assistants, Robert L. Deitz. There was congressional concern that restrictions on the OIG might have a chilling effect on its effectiveness. Senator Ron Wyden, a Democratic member of the Intelligence Committee, did not disagree with any of Hayden's conclusions but said the inquiry "should never have happened and can't be allowed to happen again."..."I'm all for the inspector general taking steps that help C.I.A. employees understand his processes, but that can be done without an approach that can threaten the inspector general's independence."

=== Public Affairs ===
The Office of Public Affairs advises the Director of the Central Intelligence Agency on all media, public policy, and employee communications issues relating to his role as CIA director and is the CIA's principal communications focal point for the media, the general public and Agency employees. See CIA influence on public opinion.

=== Talent Acquisition ===
Talent Acquisition is the office tasked with recruiting. As of July 2018, the Chief of Talent Acquisition is Sheronda Dorsey.
