= List of tallest buildings in Virginia =

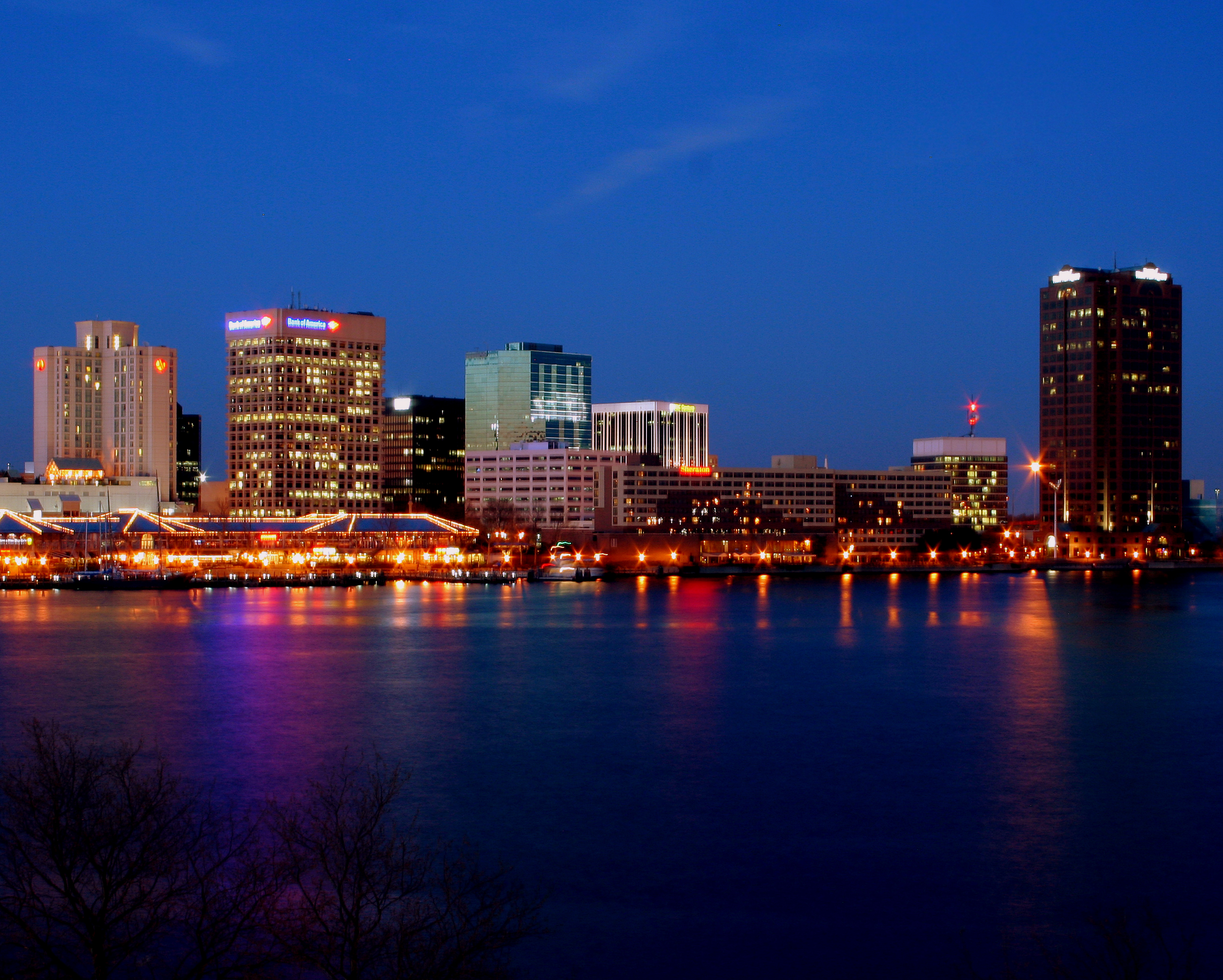
The skyline of Norfolk

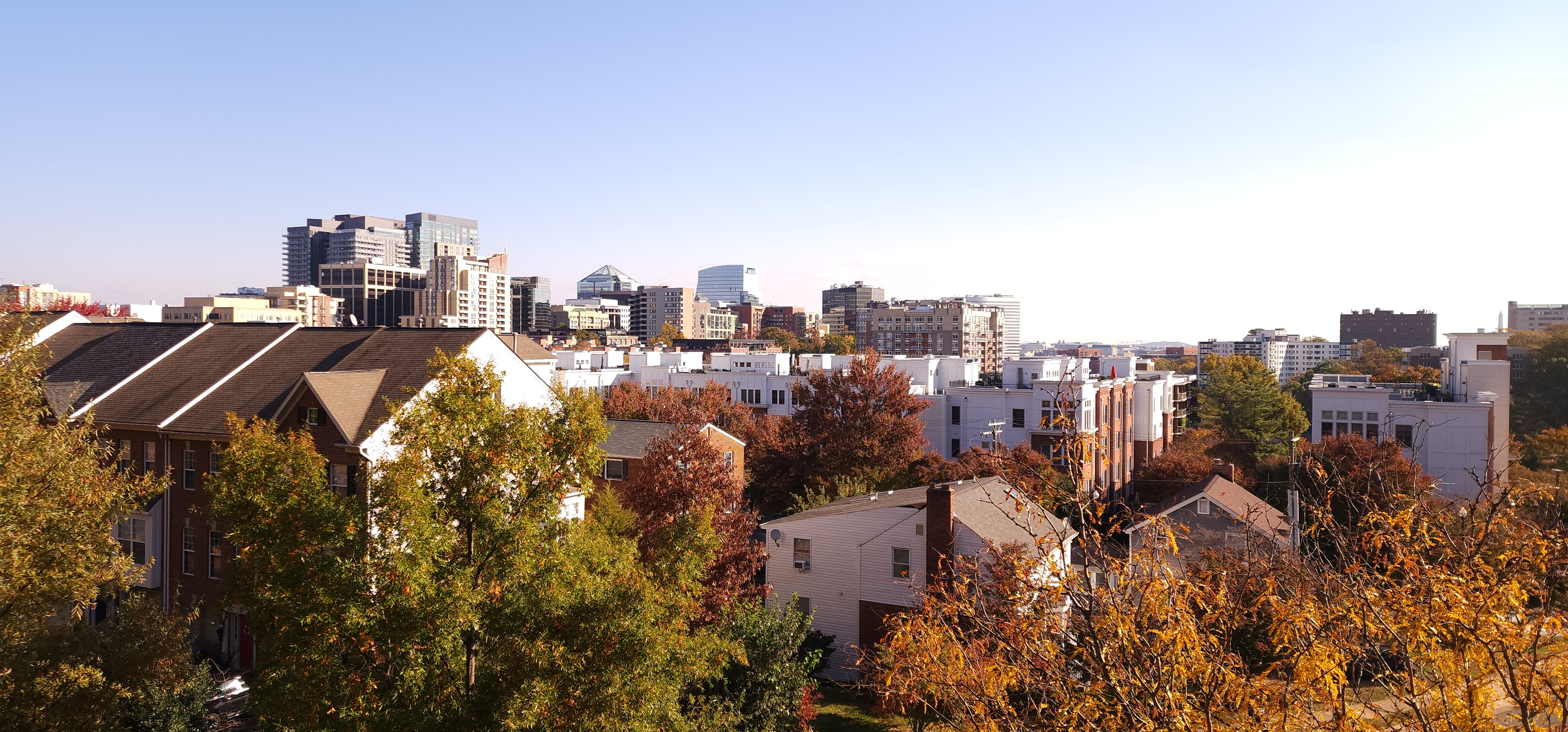
The Rosslyn skyline in 2024.

This list of tallest buildings in Virginia ranks skyscrapers over 250 feet (76 m) tall in the U.S. Commonwealth of Virginia by height. The tallest building in Virginia is the Westin Virginia Beach Town Center in Virginia Beach, which contains 38 floors and is 508 ft (155 m) tall. The antenna spire however accounts for 95 feet of the building, leaving its rooftop at 413 ft. In comparison, the Capital One Building in Tysons has its roof at 470 ft. Both buildings have their highest occupied floor significantly lower than each building's official height.

== Tallest buildings ==
Indicates buildings still under construction that have been architecturally topped out but not yet fully opened

Rank	Name	Image	Height ft (m)	Floors	Year	City	Notes
1	Westin Virginia Beach Town Center		508 (155)	38	2008	Virginia Beach	Tallest building in Virginia Beach and in Virginia since 2008. Tallest building in Virginia constructed in the 2000s.
2	Capital One Tower		470 (143)	31	2018	Tysons	Tallest building in Northern Virginia and tallest office building in the Washington metropolitan area. Tallest building in Virginia constructed in the 2010s.
3	James Monroe Building		449 (137)	29	1981	Richmond	Tallest building in Richmond. Was the tallest building in Virginia from 1981 - 2008. Tallest building in Virginia constructed in the 1980s.
4	Skymark Reston Town Center		432 (132)	40	2025	Reston	The tallest building in Reston and the tallest mixed-use residential tower in the Washington Metropolitan Area.
5	CoStar HQ2 Complex		425 (130)	24	2026	Richmond	
6	600 Canal Place		417 (127)	20	2019	Richmond	Fourth tallest building in Virginia after topping out in July 2018.
7	Capital One Center Three		410 (125)	31	2022	Tysons	Second tallest building in Virginia constructed in the 2020s.
8	Truist Place		400 (122)	26	1983	Richmond	
9	Armada Hoffler Tower		396 (121)	23	2002	Virginia Beach	
10	Federal Reserve Bank of Richmond		394 (120)	26	1978	Richmond	One of twelve Federal Reserve Banks in the United States. Tallest building in Virginia from 1978 - 1981. Tallest building in Virginia constructed in the 1970s.
11	Central Place Tower		390 (119)	32	2018	Arlington	Tallest Building in Arlington.
11	1812 North Moore Street		390 (119)	35	2013	Arlington	Was the tallest building in the Washington metropolitan area at the time of completion, overtaking the Rosslyn Twin Towers. Was surpassed by the Capital One Tower in 2017.
12	2000 Opportunity Way		387 (118)	28	2022	Reston	
13	Rosslyn Twin Tower One		381 (116)	27	1980	Arlington	
13	Rosslyn Twin Tower Two		381 (116)	27	1982	Arlington	
15	Hilton at The Key		379 feet (116 m)	36	2025	Arlington	Part of The Key. Full service hotel with 331 rooms, 28,000 SF of conference space, and retail.
16	Rise at the Boro		372 (113)	32	2019	Tysons	
17	Lumen at Tysons		365 (111)	32	2018	Tysons	
18	Adaire		356 (109)	34	2016	Tysons	
19	BLVD Haley		356 (109)	27	2025	Reston	
20	Central Place		355 (108)	31	2017	Arlington	
21	VITA		351 (107)	30	2015	Tysons	
22	1801 North Lynn Street		344 (105)	24	2002	Arlington	
23	Dominion Tower		341 (104)	26	1987	Norfolk	Tallest building in Norfolk.
24	Hilton Alexandria Mark Center		338 (103)	30	1985	Alexandria	Tallest building in Alexandria
25	George Washington Masonic National Memorial		333 (101)	9	1932	Alexandria	Tallest building in Virginia constructed in the 1930s.
26	Bank of America Center (Richmond)		331 (101)	26	1974	Richmond	
27	Metropolitan Park Jasper		327 (100)	22	2023	Arlington	Amazon HQ2. Topped out in 2022.
27	Metropolitan Park Merlin		327 (100)	22	2023	Arlington	Amazon HQ2. Topped out in 2022.
27	JW Marriott Reston Station		327 (100)	28	2025	Reston	
29	Wells Fargo Tower		320 (98)	21	1990	Roanoke	Tallest building in Roanoke. Tallest building in Virginia constructed in the 1990s.
30	Tysons Tower		318 (97)	22	2014	Tysons	
31	Richmond City Hall		315 (96)	19	1971	Richmond	
31	Fairview Park Marriott		315 (96)	16	1989	Annandale	
33	One Skyline Tower		313 (95)	26	1988	Bailey's Crossroads	Tallest building in Bailey's Crossroads
33	Turnberry Tower		313 (95)	27	2009	Arlington	
35	Riverfront Plaza West		312 (95)	20	1988	Richmond	
35	Riverfront Plaza East		312 (95)	20	1988	Richmond	Also known as BB&T
37	Verse		310 (94)	25	2019	Tysons	
37	Rosslyn Towers at The Key		310 feet (94 m)	28	2024	Arlington	Part of The Key. Luxury apartments will contain 500+ units, 28,000 SF of conference space, and retail.
39	Harbor Tower Apartments		307 (94)	25	1983	Portsmouth	
40	Icon Norfolk		305 (93)	23	1967	Norfolk	Formerly Bank of America Center. Tallest building in Virginia constructed in the 1960s.
40	Main Street Centre		305 (93)	23	1986	Richmond	
42	One Waterview Place		300 (91)	24	2008	Arlington	
42	Two Waterview Place		300 (91)	29	2007	Arlington	Also called Le Meridien Arlington, containing hotel and residences.
42	8421 Broad		300 (91)	26	2014	Tysons	Formerly called The Ascent
45	Two James Center		299 (91)	21	1987	Richmond	
45	Nouvelle		299 (91)	27	2015	Tysons	
47	Wells Fargo Center		298 (91)	23	2010	Norfolk	
47	Rosslyn Metro Center II		298 (91)	27	2002	Arlington	
47	The Watermark Hotel		298 (91)	28	2021	Tysons	
50	One James Center		295 (90)	21	1985	Richmond	
50	Heming		295 (90)	28	2023	Tysons	Mixed-use building—410 apartments over three level retail plaza
52	Parc Meridian		294 (90)	25	2016	Alexandria	
53	Cortland Rosslyn East		293 (89)	27	2021	Arlington	Also called Evo at The Highlands.
54	150 West Main Street		292 (89)	20	2002	Norfolk	
55	Eighth & Main Building		289 (88)	20	1975	Richmond	
56	1950 Opportunity Way		287 (87)	20	2022	Reston	
57	Norfolk Waterside Marriott		285 (87)	23	1991	Norfolk	
58	1750 Tysons Central		284 (87)	21	2022	Tysons	
59	Central National Bank		282 (86)	22	1930	Richmond	
59	Norfolk Southern Tower		282 (86)	20	1989	Norfolk	
61	8350 Broad		276 (84)	20	2019	Tysons	
61	Gateway Plaza		276 (84)	18	2015	Richmond	
63	Freedom Tower		275 (84)	17	2018	Lynchburg	
64	Hilton Norfolk The Main		270 (82)	23	2017	Norfolk	
65	River Tower at Harbor's Edge		265 (81)	24	2021	Norfolk	
66	The Bartlett		264 (80)	22	2016	Arlington	
67	Cortland Rosslyn West		263 (80)	23	2021	Arlington	Also called Aubrey at The Highlands.
68	J Rivelle		260 feet (79 m)	27	2026	Arlington	Former RCA site. Luxury apartments with 442 units and 12,130 SF of retail. Joined at the base and at the top by an "amenity bridge"
68	MidTown West		260 (79)	21	2006	Reston	
68	MidTown East		260 (79)	21	2006	Reston	
71	One Freedom Square		258 (79)	18	2000	Reston	
72	Skyline Square North		257 (78)	26	1982	Bailey's Crossroads	
72	Skyline Square South		257 (78)	26	1984	Bailey's Crossroads	
72	Skyline Towers North		257 (78)	26	1988	Bailey's Crossroads	
72	Skyline Towers South		257 (78)	26	1988	Bailey's Crossroads	
76	The Monarch		257 (78)	20	2023	Tysons	
77	MITRE 4		255 (78)	14	2016	Tysons	
78	Arlington Tower		250 (76)	19	1980	Arlington	

== Timeline of tallest buildings ==
Name	Image	Height	Floors	Years tallest	City	Notes
Jamestown Church		46 / 14	3	c.1639/1700-c.1682	Jamestown	The date of construction is not certain for either the Jamestown Church or St. Luke's Church. For evidentiary reasons, the Jamestown Church is included on this list.
St. Luke's Church		60 / 18	3	c.1632/82-c.1706	near Smithfield	
Governor's Palace		approximately 90 / 27	3	c.1706-1788	Williamsburg	
Virginia State Capitol		approximately 100 / 48	3	1788-1845	Richmond	
St. Paul's Episcopal Church		225 / 69	2	1845-1900/05	Richmond	St. Paul's was briefly the tallest building in the United States until Trinity Church in New York City was built in 1846. The spire was removed between 1900 and 1905 and replaced with a simpler dome, which reduced the overall height to 135 feet.
City Hall (now known as Old City Hall)		195 / 59	7	1900/05-1913	Richmond	City Hall offices from 1894 to 1971, when the new City Hall was built.
First National Bank Building		262 / 80	19	1913-1930	Richmond	Converted to residential in 2012
Central National Bank		282 / 86	22	1930-1932	Richmond	
George Washington Masonic National Memorial		333 / 101	9	1932-1978	Alexandria	
Federal Reserve Bank of Richmond		394 / 120	26	1978-1981	Richmond	One of twelve Federal Reserve Banks in the United States. Tallest building in Virginia from 1978 - 1981.
James Monroe Building		449 / 137	29	1981-2008	Richmond	Tallest building in Richmond. Was the tallest building in Virginia from 1981 - 2008.
Westin Virginia Beach Town Center		508 / 155	38	2008–present	Virginia Beach	Tallest building in Virginia.

== Tallest under construction, approved, or proposed ==
This lists buildings that are under construction, approved for construction or proposed for construction in Virginia.

Name	Image	Height ft (m)	Floors	Year	City	Status	Notes
Project Genesis Vertical Continuous Vulcanizer Tower		660 (201)	26	2028	Chesapeake	Under Construction	Would become the tallest building in Virginia upon completion.
Iconic at the View		615 (187)	48	—	Tysons	Approved	Would stand as the tallest building in the Washington Metropolitan Area, as well as the tallest building between Philadelphia and Charlotte.
The View at Tysons C-1		455 (139)	27	—	Tysons	Approved	
The View at Tysons C-2B		421 (128)	35	—	Tysons	Approved	
Arbor Row Hotel		413 (126)	28	—	Tysons	Proposed	
Capital One Center Building 7		400 (122)	39	—	Tysons	Approved	
The View at Tysons D-1		395 (120)	29	—	Tysons	Approved	
The View at Tysons C-2A		389 (119)	33	—	Tysons	Approved	
Carlyle Park 3		386 (118)	34	—	Alexandria	Approved	
Halley Rise Block H		375 (114)	32	—	Reston	Approved	
Capital One Center Building 8		373 (114)	34	—	Tysons	Approved	
Piazza at Tysons A		371 (113)	33	—	Tysons	Proposed	
Capital One Center Building 9		365 (111)	33	—	Tysons	Approved	
The Helix		350 (107)	22	—	Arlington	Approved	
Carlyle Park 1		338 (103)	30	—	Alexandria	Approved	
One Reston Town Center		330 (101)	23	—	Reston	Approved	
Capital One Center Building 10		325 (99)	22	—	Tysons	Approved	
The Mather B		321 (98)	27	2024	Tysons	Under Construction	
Campus Commons Building C		320 (98)	27	—	Reston	Approved	
Carlyle Park 2		319 (97)	28	—	Alexandria	Approved	
Halley Rise Building D1		317 (97)	28	—	Reston	Approved	
Capital One Center Building 4		305 (93)	18	—	Tysons	Approved	
RTC West Building 6		300 (91)	22	—	Reston	Approved	
RTC West Building 8		300 (91)	22	—	Reston	Approved	
Paxton		300 (91)	26	—	Tysons	Approved	
Commerce Metro Center Building C		272 (83)	22	—	Reston	Approved	
Halley Rise Building G		265 (81)	19	—	Reston	Approved	

* Table entries with dashes (—) indicate that information regarding building heights, floor counts, or dates of completion has not yet been released.

== Tallest no longer standing ==
Name	Image	Height ft (m)	Floors	Year Completed	Year Demolished	City	Notes
One James River Plaza		310 (94)	22	1978	2020	Richmond	Building demolished via implosion in May 2020.

== See also ==
- List of tallest buildings in Norfolk
- List of tallest buildings in Arlington
- List of tallest buildings in Richmond
- List of tallest buildings in Virginia Beach
- List of tallest buildings in Tysons, Virginia
