= List of tallest buildings in Richmond =

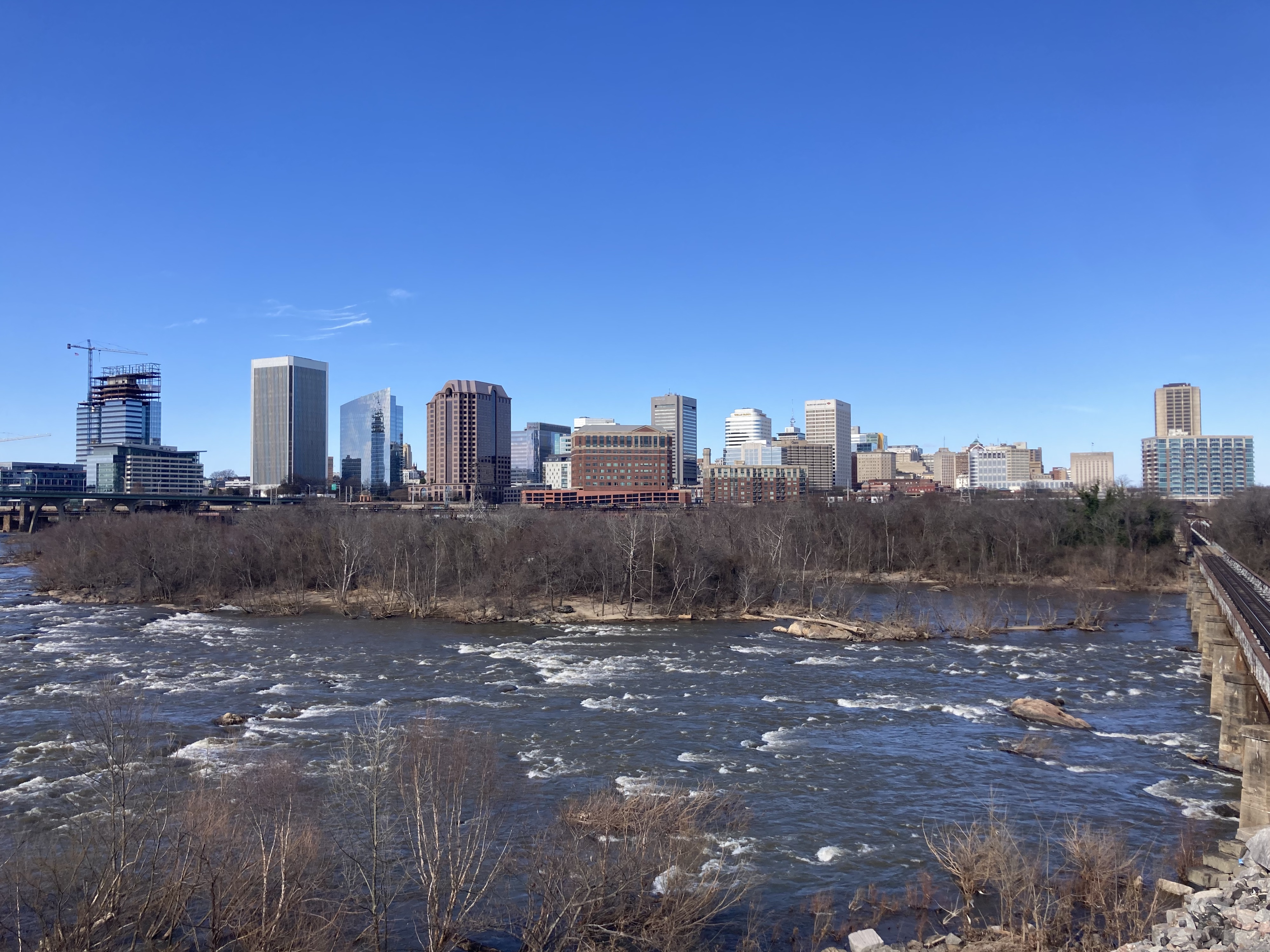
View of Downtown Richmond from the James River, March 2025

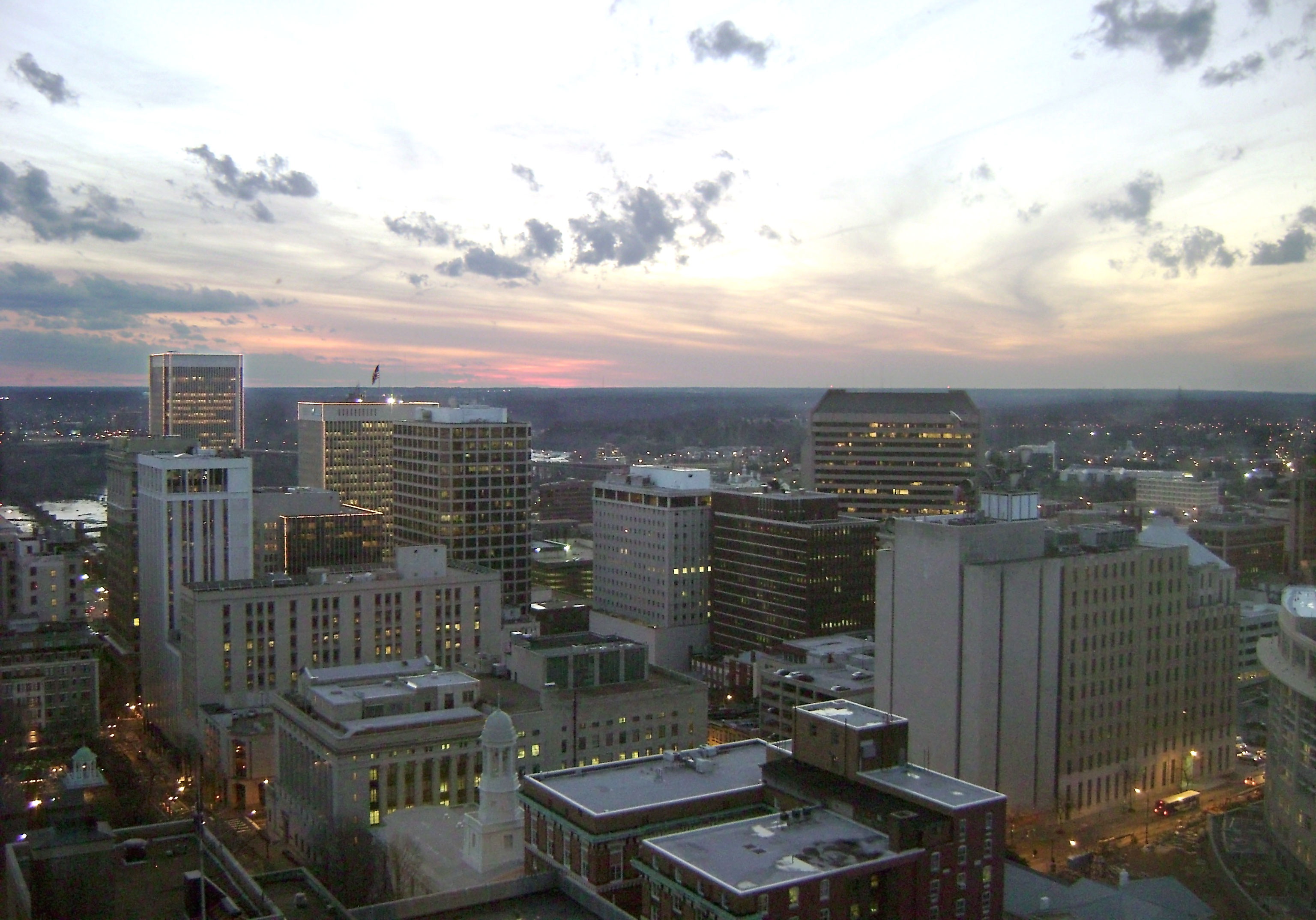
Aerial view of the center business district in 2008

This is a list of tallest buildings in Richmond, Virginia. Presently, the tallest building in Richmond is the 29-story James Monroe Building, standing at 449 feet (137 m). It was the tallest building in Virginia from the time of its completion in 1981 until 2007, when the 38-story Westin Tower in Virginia Beach opened in downtown Virginia Beach. The second-tallest building in the city is the CoStar Tower. Completed in 2026, it has a structural height of 421 feet (128 m). The third-tallest building is Dominion Energy's headquarters at 600 Canal Place at 417 feet (127 m) in height. The next three tallest skyscrapers each have 26 stories within the structure, although they vary in height: Truist Place, at 400 ft (120 m); the Federal Reserve Bank of Richmond, at 394 ft (119 m); and the Bank of America Center, at 331 ft (101 m).

The first high-rise in Richmond history is considered to be the 19-story First National Bank Building, which was completed in 1913. The structure stands at 262 ft (80 m) and is located on the southwest corner of Main Street and Ninth Street.

== Tallest buildings ==
This list ranks completed buildings in Richmond that stand at least 200 ft (61 m) tall as of 2026, based on standard height measurement. This includes spires and architectural details but does not include antenna masts. The “Year” column indicates the year of completion. Buildings tied in height are sorted by year of completion with earlier buildings ranked first, and then alphabetically.

Was the tallest building in Richmond upon completion

Rank	Name	Image	Location	Height ft (m)	Floors	Year	Purpose	Notes	
1	James Monroe Building		101 North 14th Street	449 (136.9)	29	1981	Office	Tallest building in Richmond since 1981. Tallest building completed in Richmond in the 1980s. Third tallest building in Virginia.	
2	CoStar Tower		600 Tredegar Street	425 ft	26	2026	Office / Retail	Completed July 2026.	
600 Canal Place		111 South 6th Street	417 (127.2)	20	2019	Office	Headquarters of Dominion Energy.		
	3	Truist Place		919 East Main Street	400 (121.9)	26	1983	Office	Formerly known as the SunTrust Center (1998-2021), Crestar Bank Center (1987-1998), and United Virginia Bank Center (1983-1987).
4	Federal Reserve Bank Building		701 East Byrd Street	393 (119.8)	26	1978	Office	Tallest building in Richmond from 1978 to 1981. Houses the Federal Reserve Bank of Richmond, one of twelve Federal Reserve Banks in the United States.	
5	Bank of America Center		1111 East Main Street	333 (101.5)	26	1974	Office	Tallest building in Richmond from 1974 to 1978. Formerly known as the NationsBank Center (1990-1999), Sovran Center (1983-1990), and the First and Merchants Center (1974-1983). This building replaced the First National Bank Building as the headquarters of the First and Merchants Bank.	
6	Richmond City Hall		900 East Broad Street	314 (95.7)	19	1971	Government	Tallest building in Richmond from 1971 to 1974.	
7	Riverfront Plaza, East Tower		951 East Byrd Street	312 (95.1)	22	1990	Office	Anchored by Hunton Andrews Kurth since 2018, formerly Hunton and Williams (1990-2018).	
8	Riverfront Plaza, West Tower		901 East Byrd Street	312 (95.1)	22	1990	Office	Anchored by Truist Securities since 2019, formerly by BB&T Securities (2010-2019), Wachovia Securities (2001-2007), Wheat First Union (1997-2001), and Wheat First Butcher Singer (1990-1998).	
9	Main Street Centre		600 East Main Street	305 (93)	23	1986	Office	Also known as the Virginia Lottery building.	
10	Two James Center		1021 East Cary Street	300 (91.4)	21	1987	Office	Also known as the Wells Fargo Building. Anchored by Wells Fargo (2008-Present), formerly by Wachovia (1998-2008), Central Fidelity National Bank (1993-1998), and Central Fidelity Bank (1987-1993).	
11	Eighth & Main Building		707 East Main Street	290 (88.4)	20	1975	Office		
12	One James Center		901 East Cary Street	285 (86.9)	21	1985	Office	Anchored by HCA Healthcare since 2020, formerly by McGuireWoods (2004-2015), First Union Bank (1993-2001), and Dominion Bank (1985-1993).	
13	VCU Health System Adult Outpatient Pavilion		1001 East Leigh Street	278 (85)	17	2021	Health		
14	Gateway Plaza		800 East Canal Street	276 (84.1)	18	2015	Office	Hosts a branch of TowneBank.	
15	Central National Bank		219 East Broad Street	274 (83.5)	22	1930	Residential	Tallest building in Richmond from 1930 to 1971. Converted to residential use in 2016. Formerly anchored by Wachovia (1998-2000, operations were then consolidated to Two James Center), Central Fidelity National Bank (1993-1998), Central Fidelity Bank (1979-1993), and the eponymous CNB (1930-1979).	
16	First National Bank Building		823 East Main Street	262 (79.9)	19	1913	Residential	Tallest building in Richmond from 1913 to 1930. Tallest building completed in Richmond in the 1910s. Converted to residential use in 2012.	
17	One Capitol Square		830 East Main Street	261 (79.6)	23	1964	Office		
18	Children's Hospital of Richmond at VCU's Children's Tower		1000 East Broad Street	260 (79)	16	2023	Health		
19	Virginia War Memorial Carillon		1300 Blanton Avenue	240 (73)	8	1932	Monument		
20	John Tyler Building		1300 East Main Street	240 (73)	11	1992	Office		
21	Vistas on the James		300 Virginia Street	240 (73)	18	2007	Residential		
22	Rhoads Hall		710 West Franklin Street	240 (73)	18	1968			
23	Seventh & Franklin Building		701 East Franklin Street	240 (73)	18	1967			
24	Omni Richmond Hotel		100 South 12th Street	240 (73)	18	1987			
25	Monroe Park Towers		520 West Franklin Street	240 (73)	18	1972			
26	Wytestone Plaza		801 East Main Street	240 (73)	18	1965		Formerly known as the Ross Building from 1965 to 1998.	
27	Richmond Marriott		500 East Broad Street	240 (73)	18	1984			
28	Brandt Hall		710 West Franklin Street	227 (69)	17	2005			
29	The Towers on Franklin		104 West Franklin Street	227 (69)	17	1963			
30	700 East Main Street (Holiday Inn and Suites Richmond)		700 East Main Street	227 (69)	17	1964			
31	General Assembly Building		201 North 9th Street	215 (66)	14	2023			
32	Delta Hotel (formerly Crowne Plaza)		555 East Canal Street	214 (65)	16	1986			
33	West Hospital		1200 East Broad Street	210 (64)	17	1941			
34	Riverside on the James		1001 Haxall Point	203 (62)	15	2005			
35	James Madison Building		109 Governor Street	200 (61)	15	1964			
36	Thomas Jefferson Building		1220 Bank Street	200 (61)	15	1956			
37	Williams Mullen Center		200 South 10th Street	200 (61)	15	2010			
38	Hotel John Marshall		101 North 5th Street	200 (61)	15	1929		Converted to residential in 2011.	
39	2000 Riverside Apartments		2000 Riverside Drive	200 (61)	15	1965		Tallest building in South Richmond (Manchester).	

== Tallest under construction or proposed ==
This lists buildings that are under construction, approved for construction or proposed for construction in Richmond and are planned to rise at least 200 feet (61 m), but are not yet completed structures. Under construction buildings that have already been topped out are also included.

* Table entries with dashes (—) indicate that information regarding building heights, floor counts, or dates of completion has not yet been released.

Name	Image	Height* ft (m)	Floors*	Year* (est.)	Address	Status	Notes
Avery Hall Investments Apartment Buildings		–	17	–	301 West Sixth Street	Under Construction	Set to be the tallest building in Manchester

== Tallest demolished ==
There has been one building in Richmond that once stood taller than 200 ft (61 m) and has since been demolished.

Name	Image	Address	Height ft (m)	Floors	Year completed	Year demolished	Notes
One James River Plaza		701 East Cary Street	310 (94)	22	1978	2020	Demolished via implosion in May 2020. Former headquarters of Dominion Energy. Replaced the VEPCO Headquarters 1913 building at 700 East Franklin Street and replaced by 600 Canal Street, built in 2019.

== Timeline of tallest buildings ==
Name	Image	Height ft (m)	Floors	Years as tallest	Address	Notes
St. Paul's Episcopal Church		225 (69)	2	1845-1900/05	815 East Grace Street	The spire was removed between 1900 and 1905 and replaced with a simpler dome, which reduced the overall height to 135 feet.
City Hall (now known as Old City Hall)		195 (59)	7	1900/05-1913	1001 East Broad Street	City Hall offices from 1894 to 1971, when the new City Hall was built.
First National Bank Building		262 (80)	19	1913-1930	823 East Main Street	Converted to residential in 2012
Central National Bank		282 (86)	22	1930-1971	219 East Broad Street	Converted to residential in 2016.
Richmond City Hall		315 (96)	19	1971-1974	900 East Broad Street	
Bank of America Center (Richmond)		331 (101)	26	1974-1978	1111 East Main Street	
Federal Reserve Bank of Richmond		394 (120)	26	1978-1981	701 East Byrd Street	One of twelve Federal Reserve Banks in the United States. Seventh tallest building in Virginia.
James Monroe Building		449 (137)	29	1981–present	101 North 14th Street	Third tallest building in Virginia, second by occupiable height.

== See also ==
- List of tallest buildings in Virginia
