= Tobacco Row, Richmond =

Place in Virginia, United States

Coordinates: 37°31′46.5″N 77°25′27.4″W

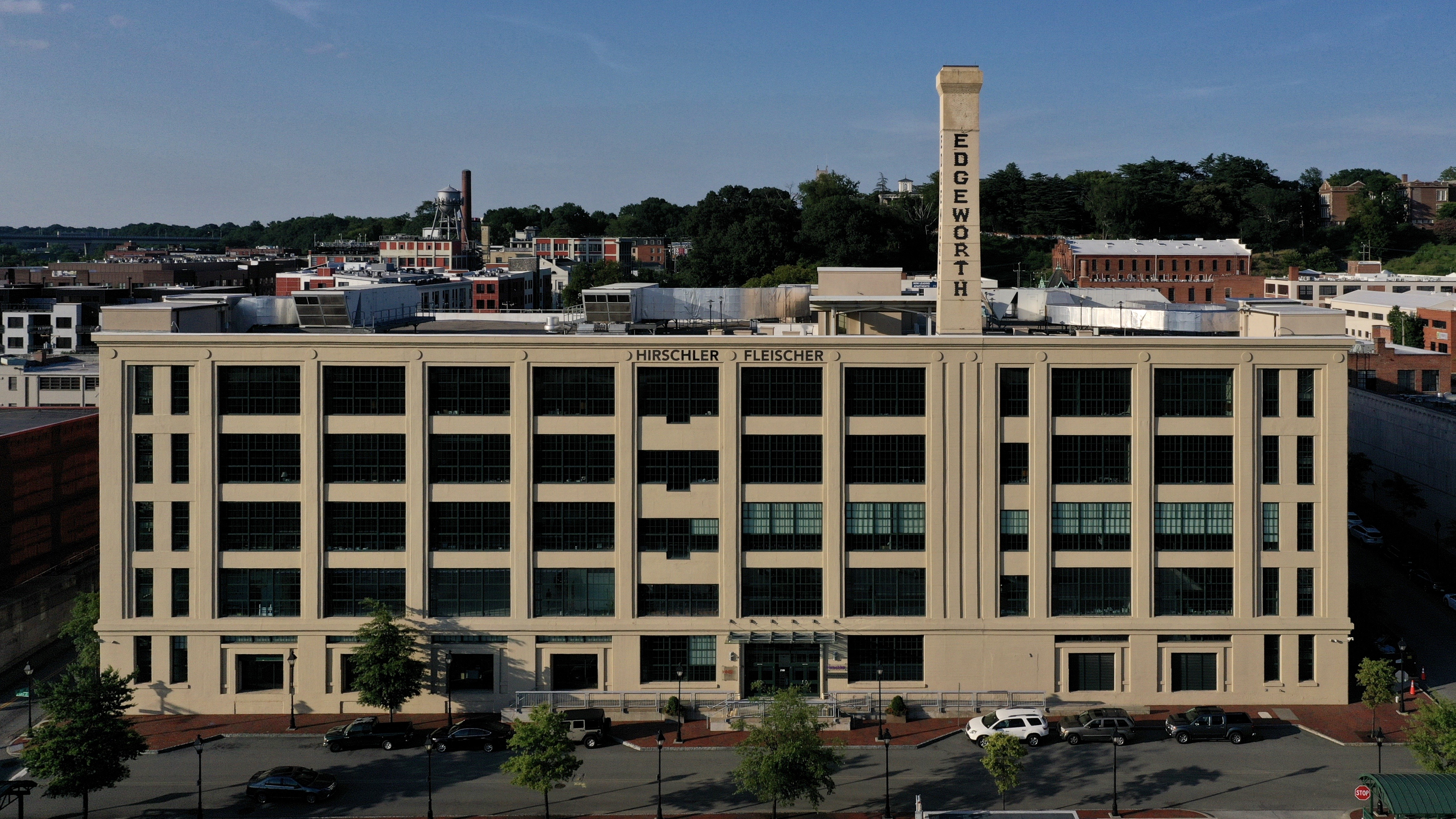
Edgeworth Building

Tobacco Row is a collection of tobacco warehouses and cigarette factories in Richmond, Virginia, adjacent to the James River and Kanawha Canal near its eastern terminus at the head of navigation of the James River.

== History ==
Beginning in the 18th century, many growers and shippers of Virginia's major cash-crop of tobacco maintained facilities there, as well as directly across the river at Manchester. Substantial multi-story brick buildings were constructed to protect the contents from loss due to fire.

During the American Civil War (1861–1865), Tobacco Row was the site of the infamous Libby Prison and nearby Castle Thunder, detention facilities of the Confederate government.

In 1925, WRVA radio, owned by Larus and Brother Company, went on the air, broadcasting from a studio located in a corner of their House of Edgeworth warehouse, with a tower mounted on the roof of the building.

== Adaptive Reuse ==
The area was vacated by the tobacco companies by the late 1980s. Following completion of Richmond's James River Flood Wall in 1995, led by Richmond developer William H. Abeloff, many of the old warehouses of Tobacco Row were modernized and converted into developments of loft apartments, condominiums, offices, and retail space along part of the restored canal system.

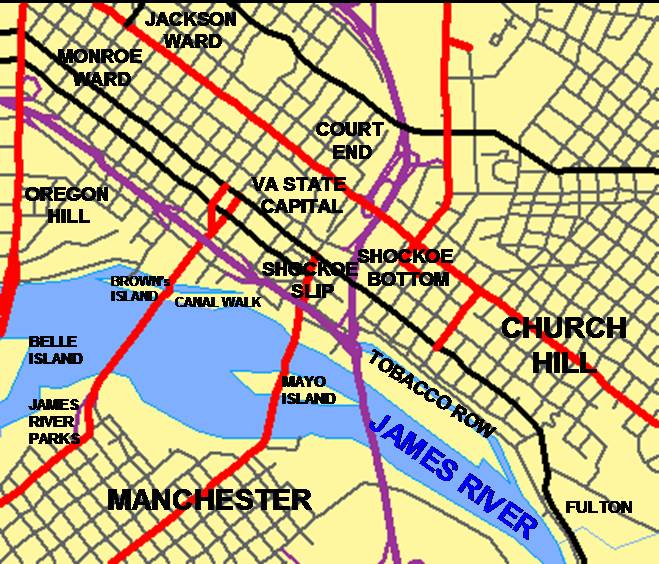
There are several areas in Downtown Richmond, including Shockoe Bottom, Shockoe Slip, the River District, Belle Isle, Monroe Ward, Manchester, Jackson Ward, Main Street, Court End, Tobacco Row, and the Canal Walk. edit

One of the warehouses is home to the Virginia Holocaust Museum.

In the mid-2010s, the neighborhood was introduced to the extreme western portion of the Virginia Capital Trail.

== See also ==
- Neighborhoods of Richmond, Virginia
