= List of tallest buildings in Virginia Beach =

The skyline of Virginia Beach remained relatively low- to mid-rise until the 2000s, when the 23-story Armada Hoffler Tower was constructed in 2002.

The Westin Virginia Beach Town Center, 38 stories tall, took the top spot from Armada Hoffler Tower when it was completed in 2008 at the newly revitalized Virginia Beach Town Center. The Westin Virginia Beach Town Center is the tallest building in the city, and in Virginia.

The city has two skylines: One at Town Center and one at the oceanfront. The following ranking is a compilation of both.

== Tallest buildings ==
This list ranks the skyscrapers over 200 feet tall in Virginia Beach, Virginia, based on standard height measurement. The height includes spires and architectural details but does not include antenna masts. The "Year" column indicates the year in which a building was completed.

Rank	Name	Image	Height ft (m)	Floors	Year	Purpose	Notes
1	Westin Virginia Beach Town Center		508 (154.8)	38	2007	Mixed-use	Mixed-use residential and hotel building. Tallest building in Virginia.
2	Armada Hoffler Tower		396 (120.7)	23	2002	Office	Tallest building in Virginia Beach from 2002 to 2007. Tallest office building in Virginia Beach.
3	Hilton Virginia Beach Oceanfront	Upload image	252 (77)	21	2003		
4	Marriott Virginia Beach Oceanfront	Upload image	232 ft (71 m)	20	2020		
5	Hyatt House Virginia Beach Oceanfront	Upload image	228 (69)	19	2016		
6	Oceanaire	Upload image	228 (69)	19	2012		
7	Ocean Beach Club	Upload image	216 (66)	18	2005		
8	Ocean Condominiums	Upload image	210 (64)	22	1975		
9	Wyndham Virginia Beach	Upload image	204 (62)	17	1985		

== Tallest under construction, approved, and proposed ==
This table lists buildings that are approved for construction in Virginia Beach and are planned to rise at least 200 feet (61 m). A floor count of 20 stories is used as the cutoff in place of a height of 250 feet (76 m) for buildings whose heights have not yet been released by their developers.

Name	Image	Height ft (m)	Floors	Status	Year	Notes
Westminster-Canterbury Tower	Upload image	250 ft (76 m)	22	Approved		

== Timeline of tallest buildings ==
Name	Image	Height ft / m	Floors	Year	Notes
Ocean Condominiums		210 / 64	22	1975–2002	
Armada Hoffler Tower		396 / 121	23	2002–2008	
Westin Virginia Beach Town Center		508 / 155	38	2008–present	Tallest building in Virginia.

== See also ==
- List of tallest buildings in Virginia
- List of tallest buildings in Arlington County, Virginia
- List of tallest buildings in Norfolk
- List of tallest buildings in Richmond
- List of tallest buildings in Tysons, Virginia
