= Downtown Richmond, Virginia =

Central business district

Coordinates: 37°32′44″N 77°26′20″W

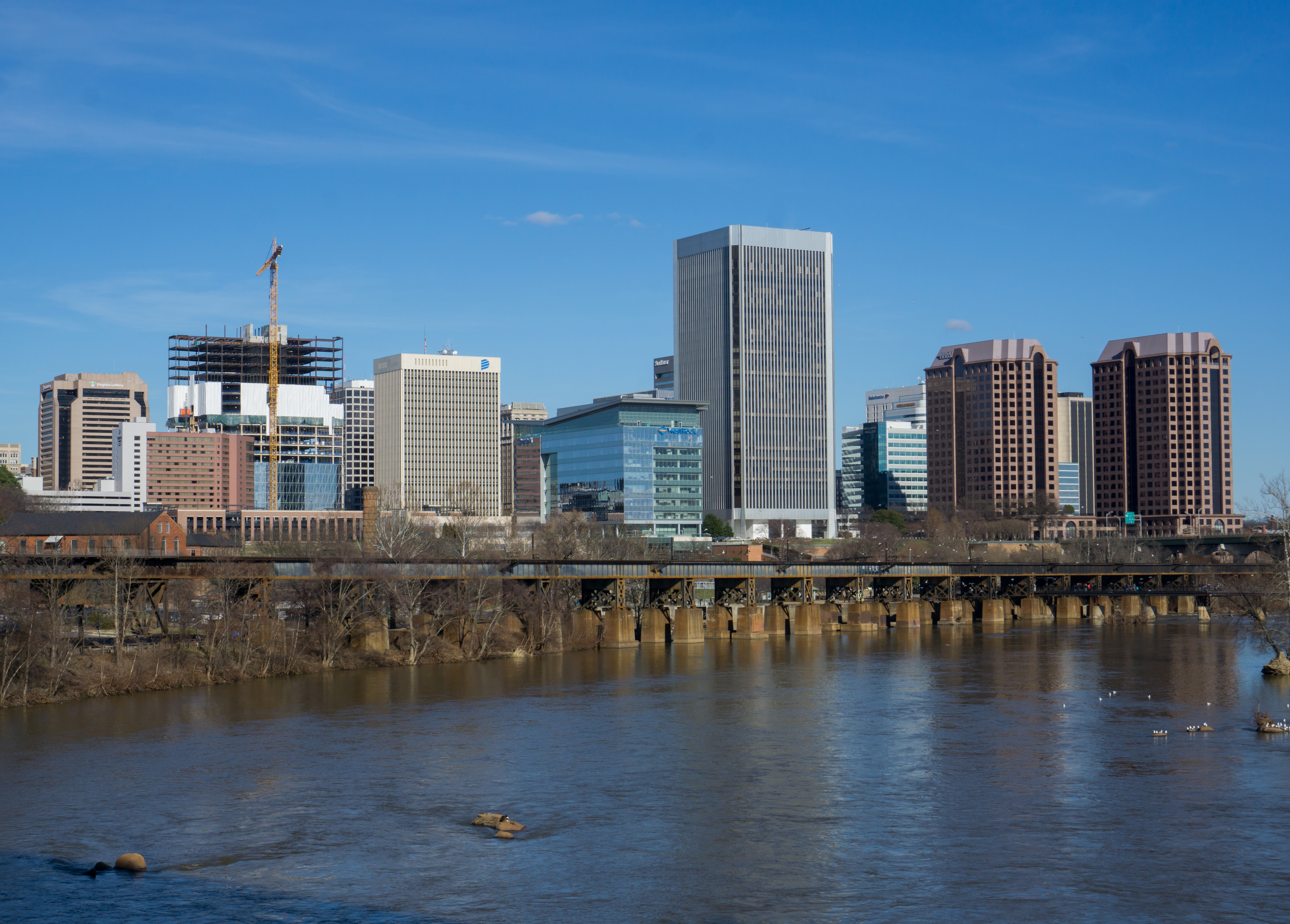
Skyline from the James River

There are several areas in Downtown Richmond, including Shockoe Bottom, Shockoe Slip, the River District, Belle Isle, Monroe Ward, Manchester, Jackson Ward, Main Street, Court End, Tobacco Row, and the Canal Walk.

Downtown Richmond is the central business district of Richmond, Virginia, United States. It is generally defined as being bound by Belvidere Street to the west, I-95 to the north and east, and the James River to the south. The Fan district borders it to the west, Highland Park to the north, Church Hill to the east, and Manchester to the south.

== Buildings and towers ==
Downtown Richmond's skyline is dominated by several notable skyscrapers. The tallest building in Richmond is the 29-story James Monroe Building at 449 feet, which also held the title of Virginia's tallest building from 1981 until 2007. The second-tallest structure is the Dominion Energy headquarters at 600 Canal Place, standing at 417 feet.

Other prominent buildings include Truist Place at 400 feet, the Federal Reserve Bank of Richmond at 394 feet, and Bank of America Plaza at 331 feet. Additional notable buildings downtown include the James Center, Richmond City Hall, the Riverfront Plaza twin towers, the James Madison Building, Main Street Centre, and the Central National Bank building.

The Greater Richmond Convention Center, a 700,000-square-foot facility located at 403 North Third Street, serves as the city's primary venue for conferences and events. VCU Medical Center comprises several hospital buildings on the MCV Campus, including the 12-story McGlothlin Medical Education Center, which opened in 2013.

== History ==
From the 1800s, downtown Richmond was a booming city, one of the largest in the nation, and a major player in the slave trade market. The district now known as Shockoe Bottom was the largest and most famous slave trade market in the entire nation, with people traveling from the South to trade, purchase, or sell slaves. When the Civil War came, though, Richmond became much of a military town, serving as the capital of the newly formed Confederate States of America. As the war came to an end, the South, in a last resort, deliberately set fire to Richmond, so that when the Union troops arrived, the entire city was ablaze. The troops tried to extinguish the fire, but 80 percent of the buildings of Downtown Richmond was completely burnt to the ground. In the era of Reconstruction, Richmond devised to rebuild and prosper back to the top as it once was, and quickly rebuilt itself. Now that all of the slaves were free, Richmond saw new economic opportunities in other businesses, such as finance, retail, and banking. In the 1920s, America shifted into an Art Deco period, which included the construction of many fancy buildings in Downtown Richmond, notably the Central Bank Building. Also, department retailers saw investment in the downtown sector, and opened up flagships. This included Sears & Roebuck, Thalhimers, and Miller & Rhoads. But the slow yet massive move out into suburban areas began making its mark on Downtown, as these department stores expanded out to the new suburban shopping centers, and eventually Sears closed the downtown store, and Thalhimers and Miller & Rhoads went defunct in the 90s. Although retail was becoming less and less of a viable economy for downtown, banking and big business began booming, and in the 1960s, Richmond began a massive build-out, which included the construction of over 600 buildings. This would go on into the 80s, until the last few skyscrapers were topped out. In 1978, the Federal Reserve Bank of Richmond, designed by renowned architect Minoru Yamasaki, debuted. Now, the economy of Richmond is booming, with several Fortune 500 companies headquartered there. Dominion Resources, MeadWestvaco, and Universal are among those headquartered in the downtown district. MeadWestvaco built its new headquarters in 2010. However large areas of the town were allowed to fall into disrepair until the creation of large swathes of HUD priority areas in the worst areas. Developers were quick to take advantage of the generous re-development loans especially since there was a ready-made market in the form of students requiring cheap housing.

== Residents, apartments, and lofts ==
The Shockoe Bottom and Shockoe Slip districts have successfully begun the process of converting tobacco warehouses and factories into lofts and apartments. Canal Walk is under consideration for development both on the residential and service sector sides, however it is not clear whether there is real consumer appetite for additional restaurants, bars and coffee shops in Richmond. HUD developments in the Manchester district are hoping to start converting former factories into apartment and loft complexes. Residential conversion of the historic John Marshall hotel is also aimed to provide inner-city living space for an optimistic planning target for residency. This is echoed by the planned new construction of Shockoe Valley Heights, a large residential development in Shockoe Bottom. The partial redevelopment of Tobacco Row, a huge row of old tobacco warehouses near fashionable Cary Street is now complete and has attracted favorable attention. The economical loft conversions have proved popular among student tenants. Further housing and redevelopment is a theme favored by Mayor Dwight C. Jones, citing plans for large apartment and condominium towers on the Canal Walk and hoping that it will attract tourists to Richmond. Unfortunately this has not occurred, however the planning is now taking a more modest line aimed at enhancing the challenge of a rather dull and empty space. Plans for the demolition of the old Reynolds Metals plant are still awaiting funding of around $50 million to be followed by reconstruction of the old canal system and development of the infrastructure with HUD grant aid before private interests can be offered a suitable development area.

== Revitalization success and future plans ==
Richmond's downtown is rich in history especially from the Civil War and reconstruction period, the "Gilded Age". A great deal of attention has been devoted to the potential tourism holds for the city, however the mainstay remains the VCU facilities and students together with the banking interests that form the backbone of the city. Industry friendly investment in infrastructure has enhanced Richmond's reputation and attracted business through the establishment of areas such as the Virginia BioTechnology Research Park, (located north of the Richmond Coliseum), which markets itself as a premier office park for research. However although much has been done in Richmond towards establishing a true urban core there are still concerns among both civic and private institutions that the city will risk crime and dilapidation in the Downtown areas unless investment is forthcoming. The City of Richmond Downtown Master Plan concretises the official line which is to build upward and create a Condo tower-based residential area Downtown. This will provide "the perfect place to live, work, and play". This will not solve the fact that there are no major national chain stores located in downtown or its direct vicinity. A rapid transport system to provide faster links between Washington and Richmond is also mooted as important to the create of New Richmond according to Mayor Dwight C. Jones: high-speed rail.

== Festivals ==
Downtown Richmond also is home to some of the nation's biggest festivals, including the National Folk Festival from 2005 to 2007, which spawned the Richmond Folk Festival, which is now one of the biggest festivals in the state, drawing as much as 200,000 people in its weekend long schedule. It takes place each year on Brown's Island and the surrounding area. There is also the National Beer Festival, which was scheduled to come to Richmond for 2011, but will return next year on account that it was cancelled under mysterious circumstances. There are much more festivals that bring nearly a million people to Richmond every year. There is also the 2nd Street Festival in Jackson Ward, considered part of Downtown, and an Italian Festival, the Que Pasa? Hispanic Festival, and in the holidays, the James Center Grand Illumination.
