= Main Street Banking Historic District =

Historic district in Virginia, United States

- U.S. National Register of Historic Places
- U.S. Historic district
- Virginia Landmarks Register
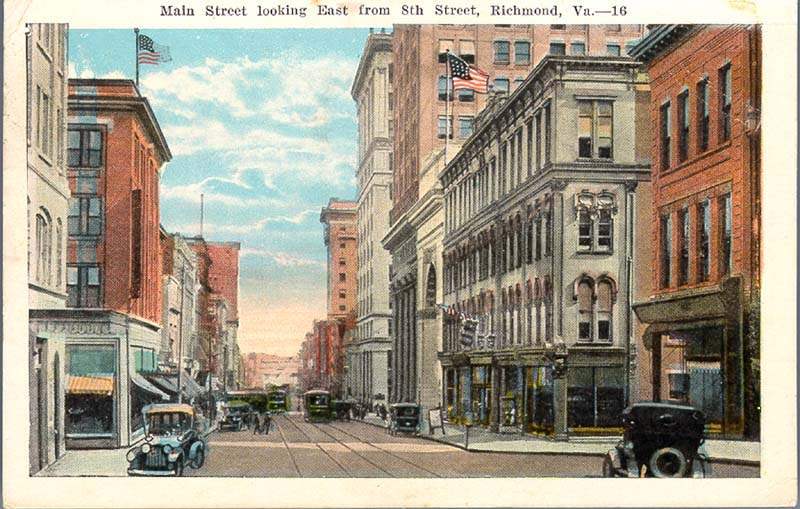
- Main Street, East at 8th Street, 1929

- Location within Virginia Location within the United States
- Location: E. Main St. between 7th & Governors Sts.; 700, 703, 705-711, 801, 830-838 Main St., E., 7 7th & 28 6th Sts., S., Richmond, Virginia
- Coordinates: 37°32′17″N 77°26′11″W
- Area: 13 acres (5.3 ha)
- Built: 1865-1965
- Architect: Robinson, Charles M.; et al.
- Architectural style: Late Victorian, Late 19th And 20th Century Revivals, International Style
- NRHP reference No.: 05000527 (original); 13000644 (increase); 100012247 (decrease)
- VLR No.: 127-6031

Significant dates
- Added to NRHP: June 1, 2005
- Boundary increase: August 27, 2013
- Boundary decreases: September 22, 2025
- Designated VLR: March 16, 2005; June 19, 2013

The Main Street Banking Historic District is a national historic district located in downtown Richmond, Virginia. The district encompasses 19 contributing buildings located south of the Virginia State Capitol and west of the Shockoe Slip Historic District. It is the location of a number of buildings built for or occupied by banking institutions. The district includes representative examples of the Late Victorian and International Style architecture built between about 1865 and 1965. Notable buildings include the Virginia Employment Commission Building (1960), the 700 Building (1964), the Ross Building (1964), the Fidelity Building (1965). Located in the district is the separately listed First National Bank Building.

It was added to the National Register of Historic Places in 2005, with a boundary increase in 2013 and a decrease in 2025.
