= Old City Hall (Richmond, Virginia) =

- U.S. National Register of Historic Places
- U.S. National Historic Landmark
- Virginia Landmarks Register
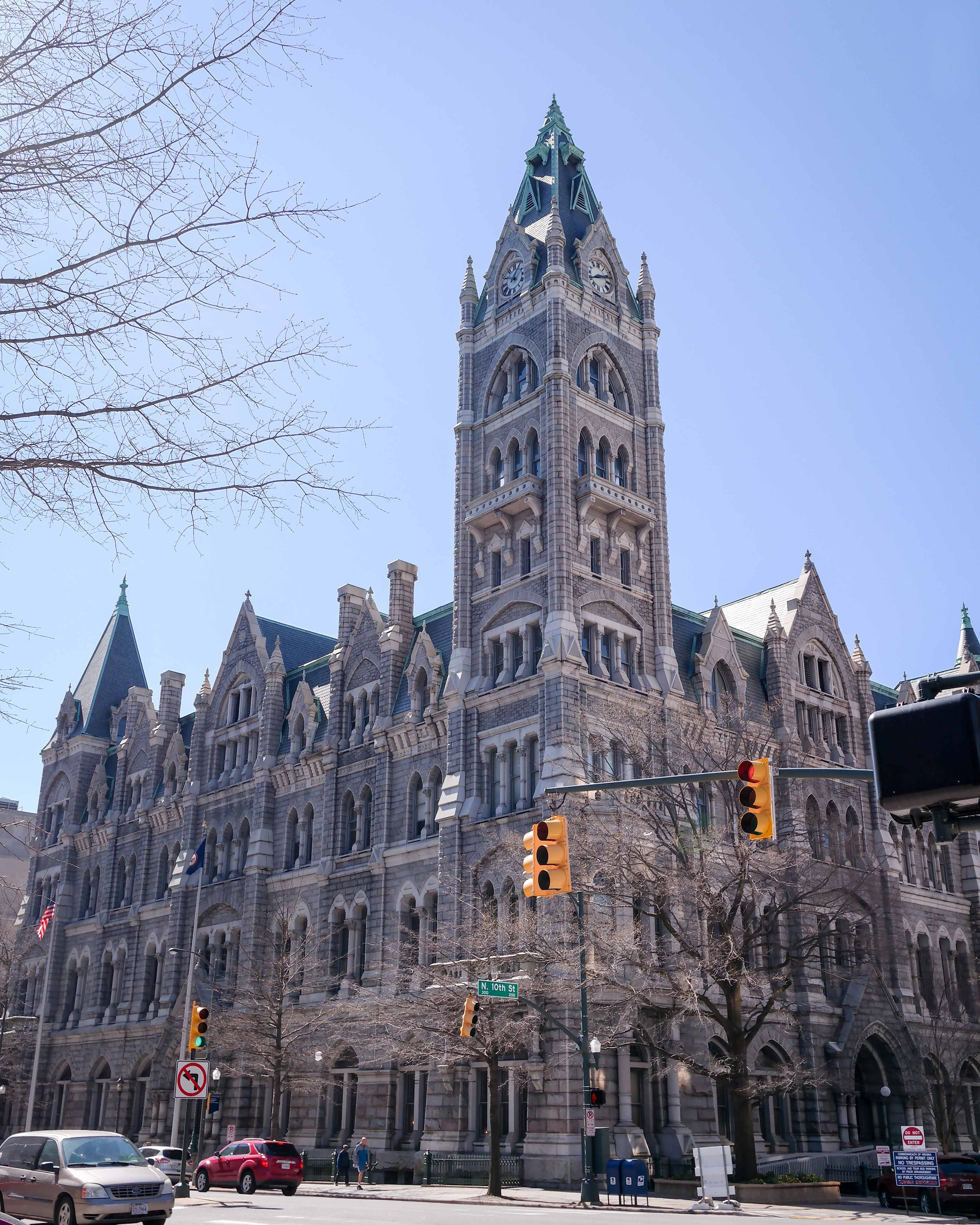
- 2015 photograph

- Location within Virginia Location within the United States
- Interactive map of Old City Hall
- Location: Richmond, Virginia
- Coordinates: 37°32′23″N 77°25′59″W
- Built: 1886
- Architect: Elijah E. Myers
- Architectural style: Gothic Revival
- NRHP reference No.: 69000327
- VLR No.: 127-0003

Significant dates
- Added to NRHP: October 1, 1969
- Designated NHL: November 11, 1971
- Designated VLR: November 5, 1968

Old City Hall, known formerly as City Hall, is the former city hall of Richmond, Virginia that was designed by Elijah E. Myers. It served as City Hall from its completion in 1894 through the 1970s. The building occupies its own city block in downtown Richmond, bounded by 10th and 11th Streets to the west and east, and Capitol Street and East Broad Street to the south. The building is executed in a meticulous Gothic Revival style, and was designated a National Historic Landmark for its architecture.

== Description ==
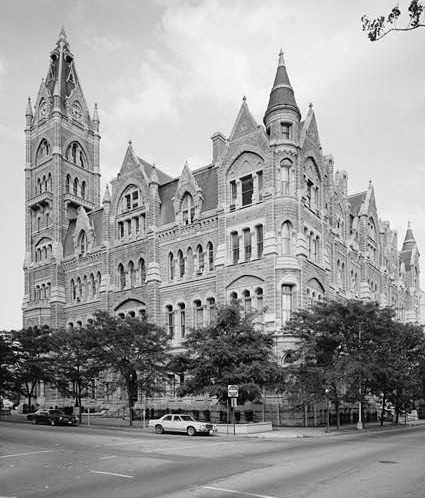
1981 HABS photograph

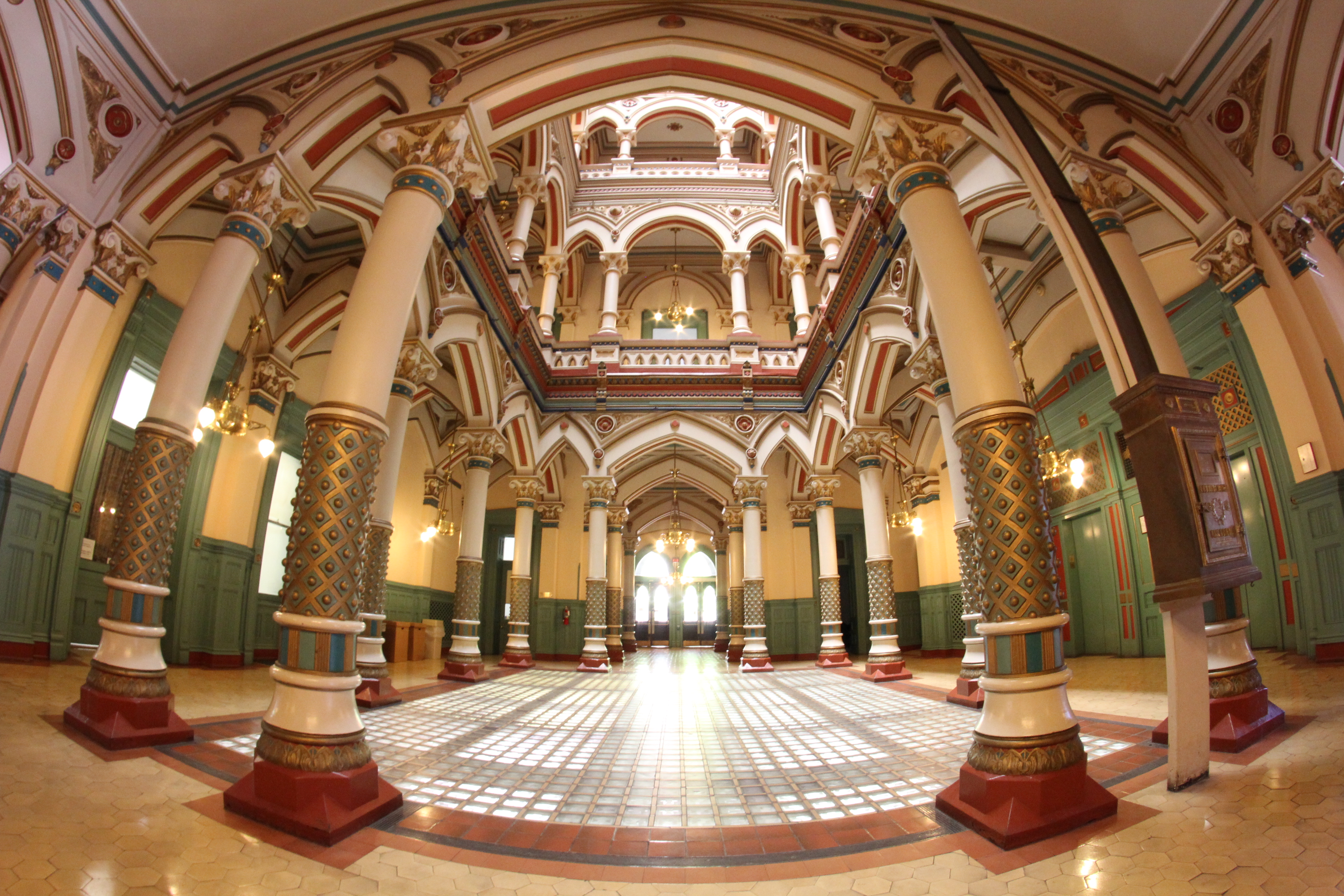
View of interior atrium

While the overall composition of the building is generally symmetrical, the 195-foot (59 m) clock tower on the left side of the principal facade gives an impression of asymmetry. The four main levels are executed in gray granite. The interior centers around a large skylit atrium surrounded by four levels of cloister-like arcades, linked by a grand staircase. The building housed city offices and courts. Granite was locally obtained from quarries along the James River near Petersburg, and was shaped by workers under the direction of subcontractor James Netherwood. Iron work was by Asa Snyder.

== History ==
The Old City Hall occupies a site that previously accommodated three notable buildings, all demolished for the new structure. The first City Hall, designed by Robert Mills and Maximilian Godefroy and completed in 1818 was demolished because it was considered structurally deficient. Also demolished were the Edmund Randolph House, a circa 1800 octagonal-ended house, and the 1853 First Presbyterian Church, which was moved off the site in 1873. A design competition was held in 1883, with a design by Elijah E. Myers of Detroit selected in 1884. The project was bid twice, and both times the low bids were well above the budget. A new competition was held, and a design by Wait & Cutter of Boston was selected. Working drawings were prepared in 1886. Despite this, later that year the city council reversed its former decision and moved forward with the Myers design.

Ground was broken for the new structure in 1886, with costs rising from a projected $300,000 to $1,318,349.19. Myers was a well-respected architect who had designed the state capitols of Colorado, Idaho, Michigan and Texas, but it was later found that Myers had paid a bribe of $1,500 to ensure that his design would be built. Cost overruns were attributed to the massive and ornamented nature of the design. From 1900/05 to 1913, City Hall was the tallest building in both Richmond and Virginia until being surpassed by the First National Bank Building. By 1915, with the popularity of the Beaux-Arts style, proposals were made to demolish City Hall to create a mall aligned with the northern side of the Virginia State Capitol. Renewed demolition threats surfaced in the 1970s, but the building was restored in the early 1980s and is used for offices.

The Old City Hall was listed on the National Register of Historic Places on October 1, 1969 and was designated a U.S. National Historic Landmark in 1971.

== See also ==
- List of National Historic Landmarks in Virginia
- National Register of Historic Places listings in Richmond, Virginia
