= 600 Canal Place =

Office skyscraper in Richmond, Virginia

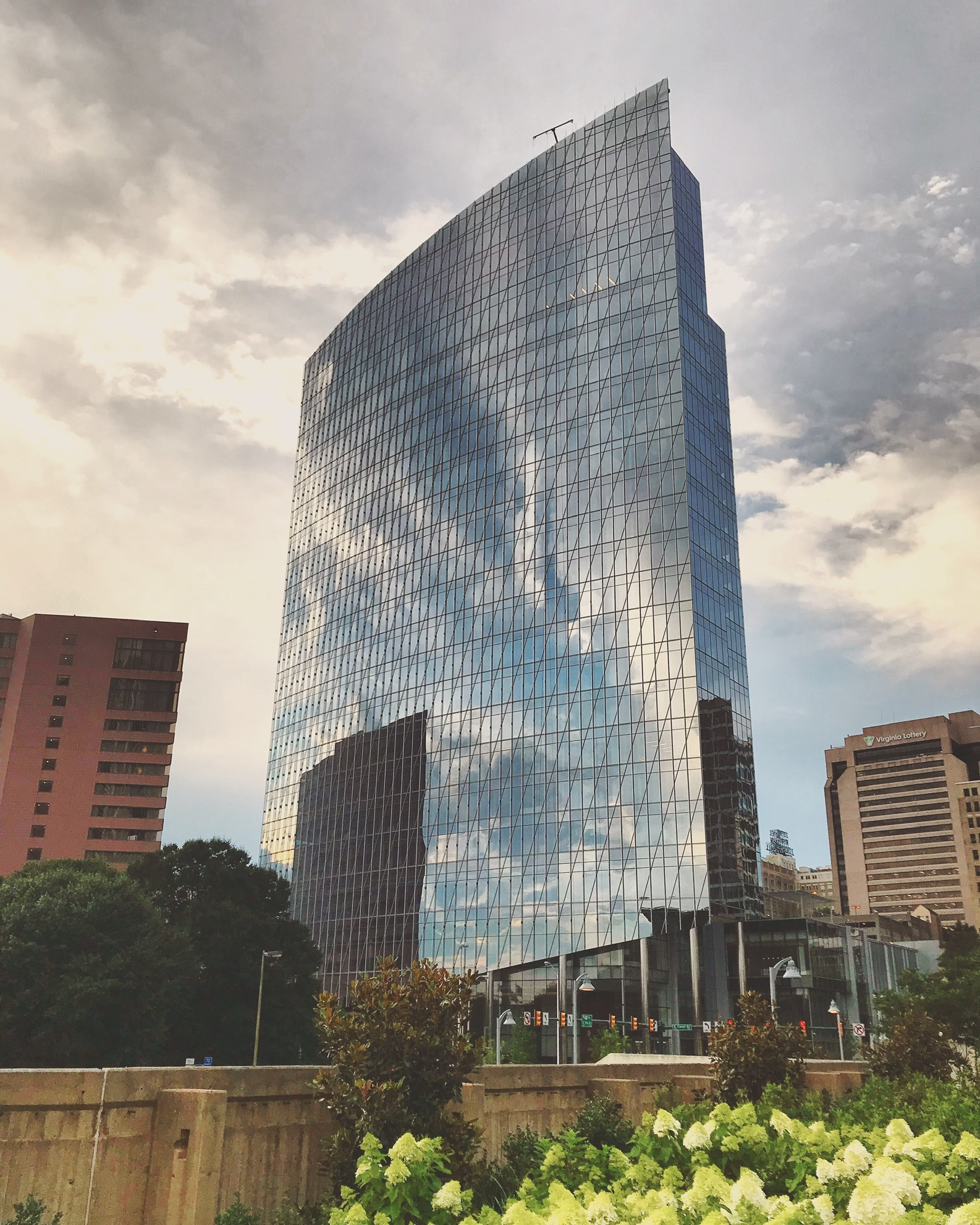
- Interactive map of the 600 Canal Place area

General information
- Status: Completed
- Coordinates: 37.538175988971204°N 77.43981811624238°W
- Construction started: December 2016
- Completed: September 2019

Height
- Height: 417 ft (127 m)

Technical details
- Floor count: 20

Design and construction
- Architect: Pickard Chilton
- Developer: Dominion Energy
- Main contractor: Hourigan Construction

600 Canal Place is 20-story, 417-foot-tall skyscraper in Richmond, Virginia. The tower serves as the headquarters for Dominion Energy. It is located at 600 East Canal Street.

== History ==
600 Canal Place was proposed by Dominion Energy in 2016 to serve as the new headquarters for the company. Plans called for the development to include office space, a fitness center, and ground-floor commercial space. A groundbreaking ceremony for 600 Canal Place was held on December 12, 2016, with expected completion in 2019.

== Construction ==
Architecture for 600 Canal Place was provided by Pickard Chilton. Hourigan Construction served as the main contractor for the project. Construction on 600 Canal Place was completed in September 2019.

== See also ==
- List of tallest buildings in Richmond, Virginia
- List of tallest buildings in Virginia
