= First Freedom Center =

Coordinates: 37°32′8.3″N 77°25′56.4″W

The Valentine First Freedom Center
- First Freedom Center
- Established: 2015
- Location: Richmond, Virginia
- Type: History museum
- Website: http://thevalentine.org/firstfreedomcenter

The First Freedom Center is a 501(c)(3) nonprofit located in Richmond, Virginia. Its mission is to commemorate and educate about freedom of religion and conscience as proclaimed in Thomas Jefferson's Virginia Statute for Religious Freedom. Located in the Shockoe Slip district of downtown Richmond, the Center sits on the site where Jefferson's statute was enacted into law by the Virginia General Assembly on January 16, 1786. Championed through the Virginia General Assembly by James Madison, the statute was the first law of absolute religious freedom enacted in the young nation and served as a template for the religion clauses of the First Amendment to the U.S. Constitution, which would be ratified five years later (1791).

== The Council for America’s First Freedom ==
The Council for America's First Freedom formed in Richmond in 1984 to prepare for the 1986 bicentennial of the Jan. 16, 1786, ratification of the Statute. The council registered the trademark for "First Freedom Center" with the US Patent office in 2003.

== First Freedom Awards ==
The First Freedom Center commemorates National Religious Freedom Day by an annual First Freedom Award presentation. The three annual awards include a Virginia First Freedom Award as well as national and international awards

Past recipients of the award include:

- Madeleine Albright
- Tony Blair
- Richard C. Holbrooke
- Chet Edwards
- Bill and Judith Moyers

== Opening of the Center ==
While educational and award activities happened for years, the Council pursued an actual "bricks and mortar" center for several years. In 2004, the center announced that groundbreaking for the center would occur in 2005 with doors to open in 2007. After some delays, the First Freedom Center opened in January 2015 with a commemoration featuring Gov. Terry McAuliffe and Richmond Mayor Dwight Jones. The FFC was taken over by The Valentine in July 2015.

== Description of the Center ==
The First Freedom Center is connected to the newly finished Courtyard and Residence Inns by Marriott (and owned by Apple Hospitality ) and features 2,200 square feet of installations that "delve into America's experience with religious liberty from its European roots through today"

According to the Richmond Times Dispatch, "The museum features statues of Jefferson and James Madison, along with exhibits and displays that trace and celebrate America’s experiment with religious liberty, from the 1600s through today. One wall will feature changing exhibits that highlight current events related to religious freedom. Outside is a 27-foot spire and a wall etched with a paragraph of the 1786 statute, which laid the foundation for the religious freedom guaranteed in the Bill of Rights."
