= Central Office District =

Central business district in downtown Richmond, Virginia, US

- Business district
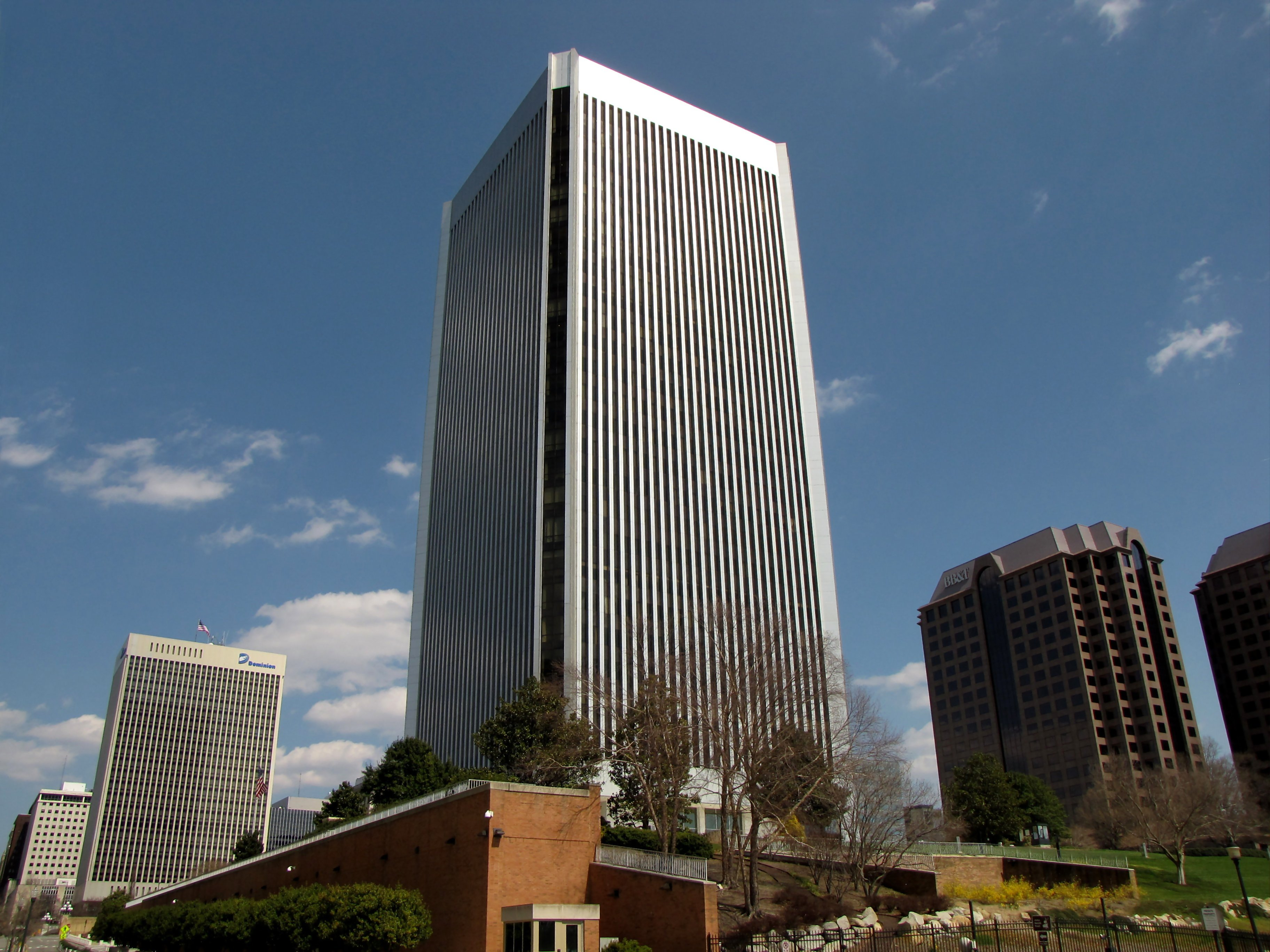
- Fifth District headquarters of the Federal Reserve (Federal Reserve Bank of Richmond

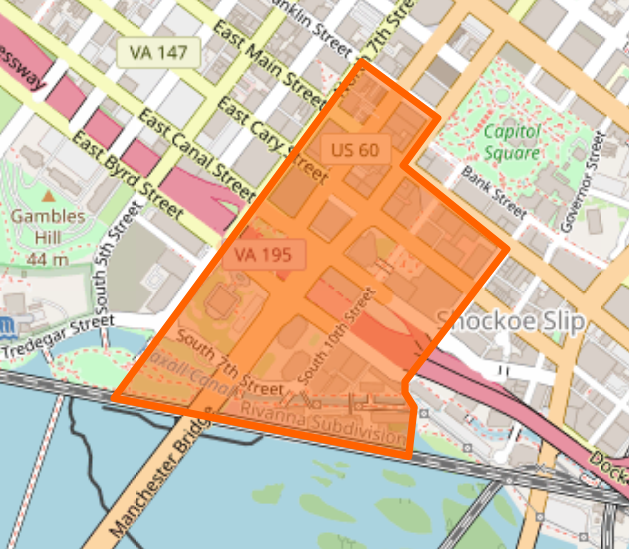
- Central Office District map
- Coordinates: 77.437925°S 37.5363581°W
- Country: United States
- State: Virginia
- Municipality: Richmond
- District: Downtown Richmond
- Elevation: 89 ft (27 m)
- Time zone: UTC-5 (Eastern Standard Time)
  - Summer (DST): UTC-4 (Eastern Daylight Time)
- ZIP Code: 23219
- NANP area code: 804

The Central Office District is the central business district for Downtown Richmond, Virginia. The district contains a majority of the city core, with several high rises situated in this region of the city. The District houses the headquarters of the Fifth District of the Federal Reserve, the Federal Reserve Bank of Richmond. It also is home to Dominion Virginia Power's corporate headquarters, Kanawha Plaza and the Virginia Tourism Corporation. U.S. Route 60 (South 9th Street) is the main street through the district.
