= Allied Arts Building =

Historic building in Virginia, US

- U.S. National Register of Historic Places
- U.S. Historic district – Contributing property
- Virginia Landmarks Register
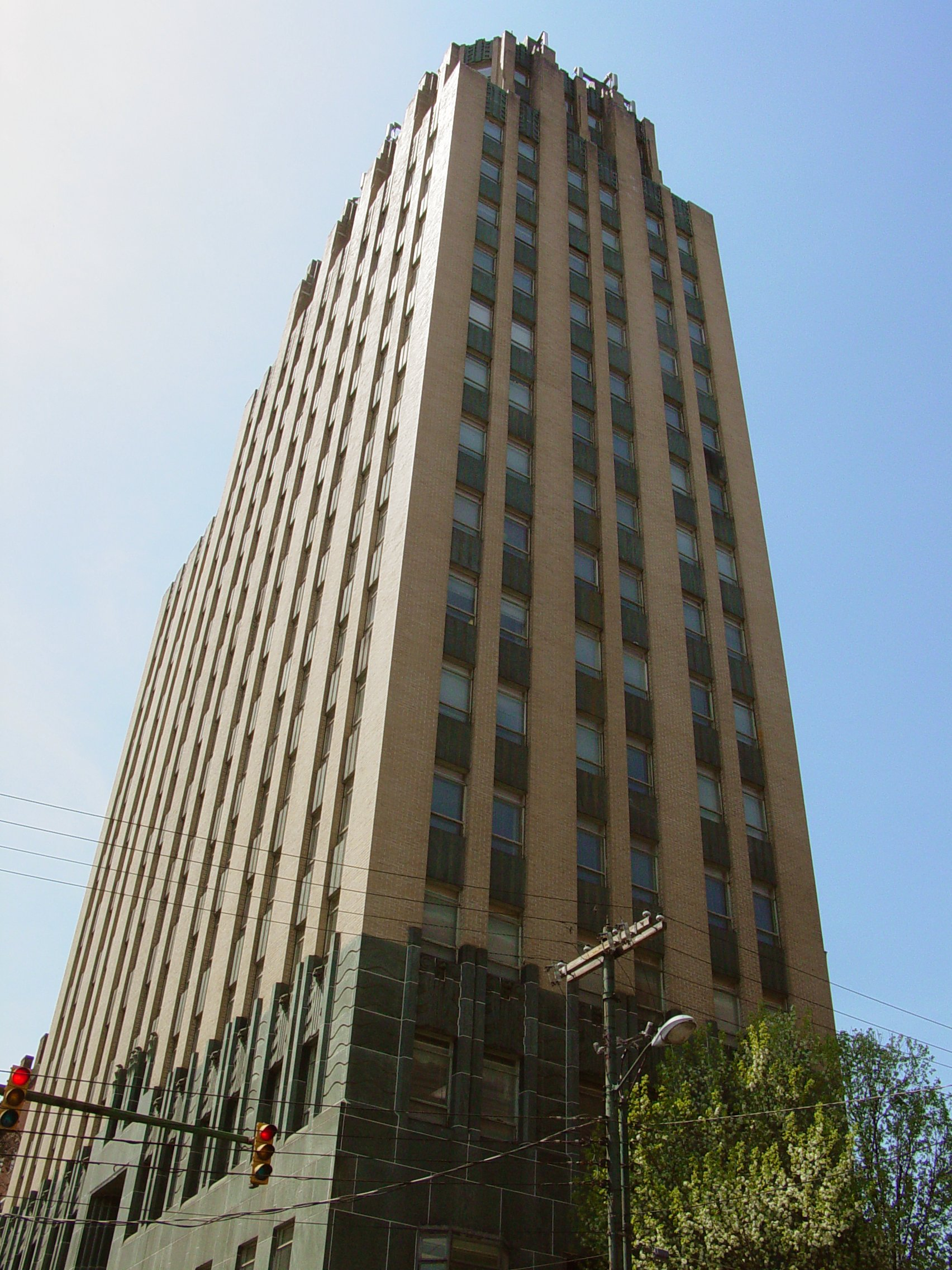
- Allied Arts Building

- Location within Virginia Location within the United States
- Location: 725 Church St., Lynchburg, Virginia
- Coordinates: 37°24′52″N 79°8′39″W
- Area: less than one acre
- Built: 1929
- Architect: Johnson, Stanhope S.; Staples, Addison
- Architectural style: Art Deco
- NRHP reference No.: 85003203
- VLR No.: 118-0110

Significant dates
- Added to NRHP: December 19, 1985
- Designated VLR: April 16, 1985

The Allied Arts Building is a historic high-rise building located at 725 Church Street in Lynchburg, Virginia. It is currently being remodeled for apartments.

Construction of the building began in 1929 and was completed in 1931, and it was designed by Stanhope S. Johnson and Addison Staples. The 17-story, 40-foot (12 m) by 132-foot (40 m) building was the tallest building in Lynchburg until completion of the Bank of the James Building in 1972. It is steel framed and faced in yellow brick and greenstone in Art Deco style. Its outer shape and design is very similar to that of the Central National Bank in Richmond, Virginia.

It was listed on the National Register of Historic Places in 1985. It is located in the Court House Hill-Downtown Historic District.

== See also ==
- Central National Bank (Richmond, Virginia)
