= Riverfront Plaza =

Twin-tower skyscraper complex in Richmond, Virginia, U.S.

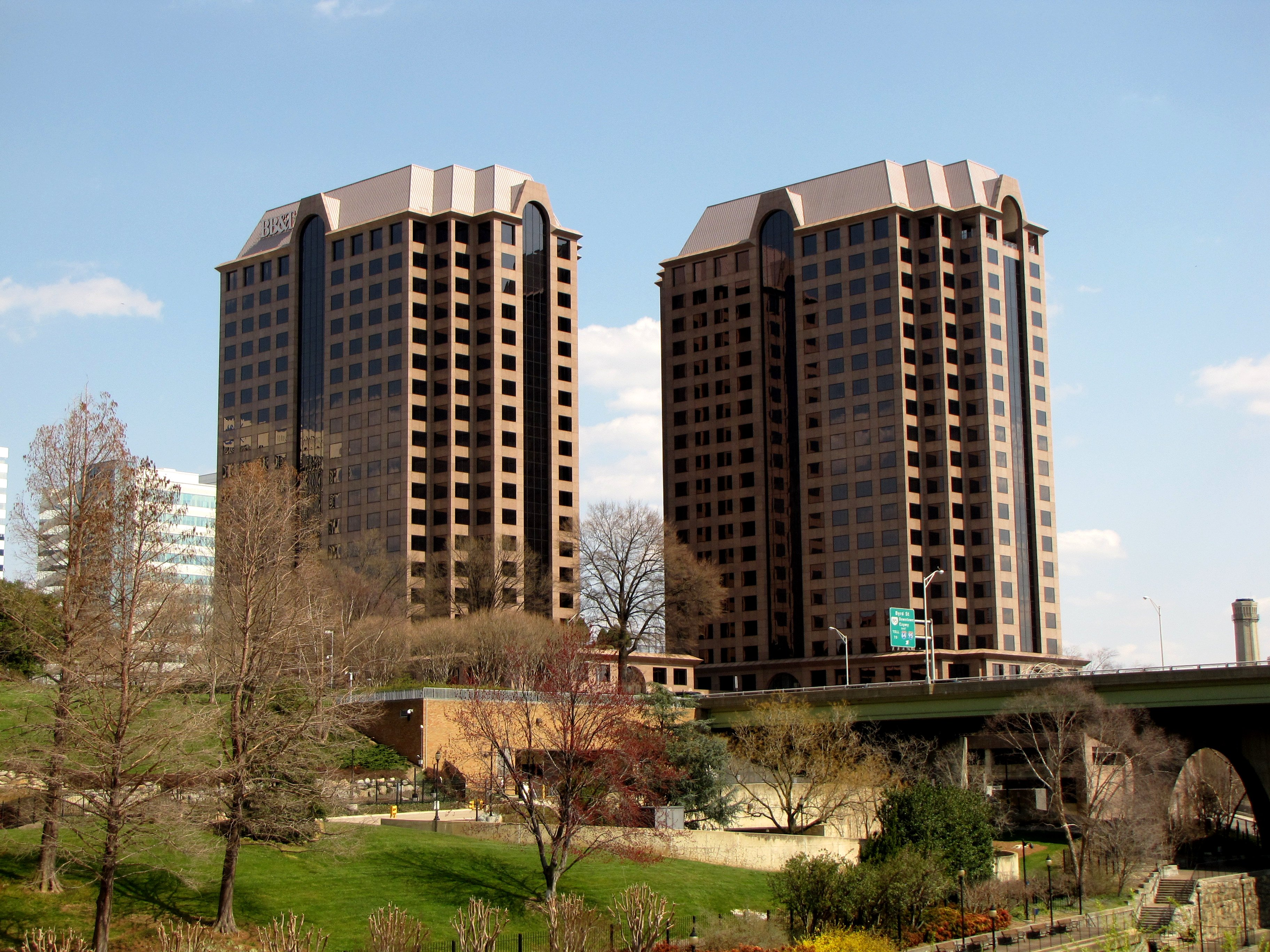
- Riverfront Plaza, from Brown's Island, in 2013
- Interactive map of the Riverfront Plaza area
- Former names: River Plaza (pre-construction)

General information
- Status: Completed
- Type: Office; retail; parking
- Location: Central Office District, Downtown Richmond, 901 and 951 East Byrd Street, Richmond, Virginia, U.S.
- Coordinates: 37°32′05″N 77°26′20″W
- Year built: 1988−1990
- Cost: US$136 million (1990)
- Owner: Hertz Investment Group (since 2015)

Height
- Height: 312 ft (95 m)

Technical details
- Floor count: 20 (each tower)
- Floor area: 951,897 sq ft (88,434 m^{2})

Design and construction
- Architect: Keith Simmons of Harwood K. Smith & Partners
- Developer: Riverfront Plaza Partnership; Daniel Corporation; Hunton & Williams; Wheat, First Securities
- Main contractor: Fluor Daniel

Website
- riverfrontplazarichmond.com

Riverfront Plaza is twin-tower office building complex in the downtown area of Richmond, Virginia. Built from 1988 to 1990 on the former site of the Old Mansion Coffee Co., it was developed as a joint venture of the law firm Hunton & Williams (now Hunton Andrews Kurth), which still occupies most of the east tower; the Daniel Corporation; and Wheat, First Securities.

In 2015, Hines Interests Limited Partnership sold the complex, which it had owned since 2006, to California Hertz Investment Group. In August 2025, Wells Fargo initiated foreclosure proceedings in Richmond's circuit court on behalf of Hertz's lenders, arguing that Hertz had previously defaulted on a $146 million loan secured by the property and that additional defaults were imminent with the expiration of anchor tenant Truist's lease at the end of the month. The court granted Wells Fargo's motion to place the property under the receivership of JLL, in order to prepare for the anticipated sale of the complex.
