= Westin Virginia Beach Town Center =

38 story high rise hotel and living residence in Downtown Virginia Beach

The Westin Virginia Beach Town Center
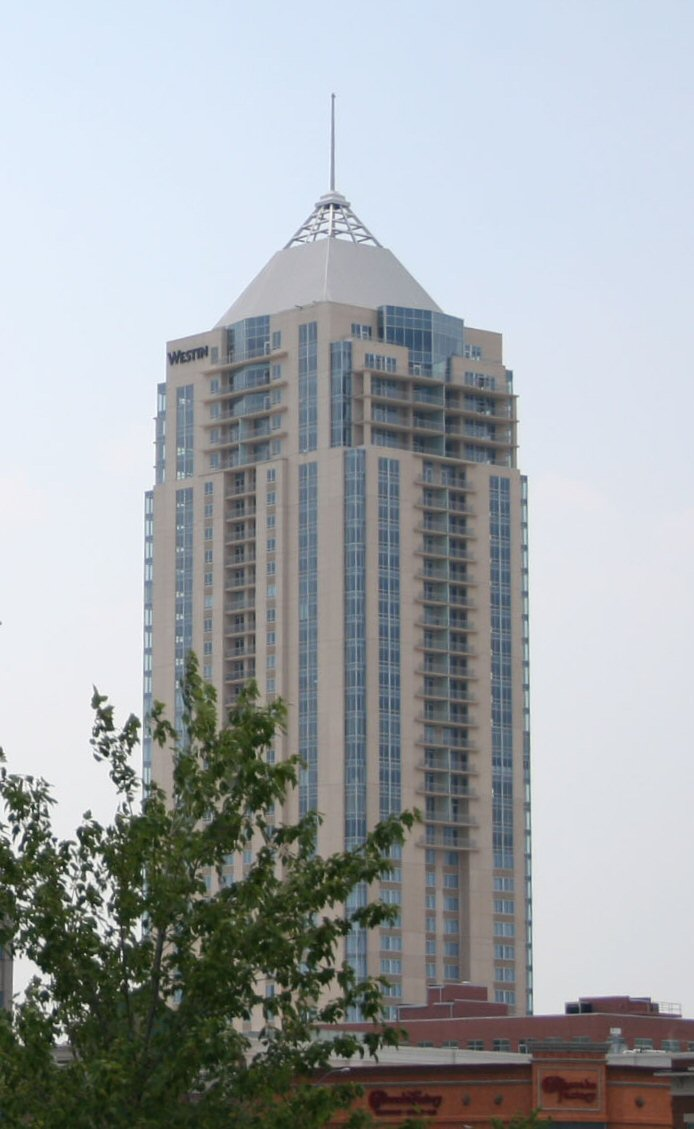
- Westin Virginia Beach Tower

General information
- Type: Hotel, Residence
- Location: 4535 Commerce Street; Virginia Beach, Virginia 23462
- Coordinates: 36°50′32″N 76°8′3.6″W
- Construction started: 2006
- Completed: 2008
- Opening: November 28, 2007
- Cost: $98 million

Height
- Antenna spire: 508 ft (155 m)
- Roof: 413 ft (126 m)

Technical details
- Floor count: 38
- Lifts/elevators: 3 for hotel floors, 2 for residence floors

Design and construction
- Architect: BBGM
- Developer: Armada Hoffler

Website
- www.marriott.com/hotels/travel/orfwi-the-westin-virginia-beach-town-center/

The Westin Virginia Beach Town Center is a 38 story high rise hotel and living residence in Virginia Beach Town Center, Virginia Beach, Virginia. The 4 star, 236-room hotel occupies the first 15 floors of the building, while the upper stories are residential. The 119 condominiums in the top floors range from 900 to 4,000 square feet (370 m^{2}). Construction began in 2006. Upon completion in 2008, it became the tallest building in both Virginia Beach and Virginia, surpassing the James Monroe Building in Richmond. In 2018, the hotel portion of the building was renovated.

The skyscraper is the tallest building in the Hampton Roads region, a Combined statistical area that is located in southeastern Virginia and northeastern North Carolina. It is ranked as the 6,809th tallest building in the world, measured from its foundation to the antenna spire. The total floor area is approximately 903,000 sq feet (84,000 sq meters), with a meeting room area of 11,266 sq feet (1,047 sq meters).

== See also ==
- CTI Consultants
- List of tallest buildings by U.S. state and territory
- List of tallest buildings in Virginia
