= Monroe Ward =

- Neighborhood of Richmond
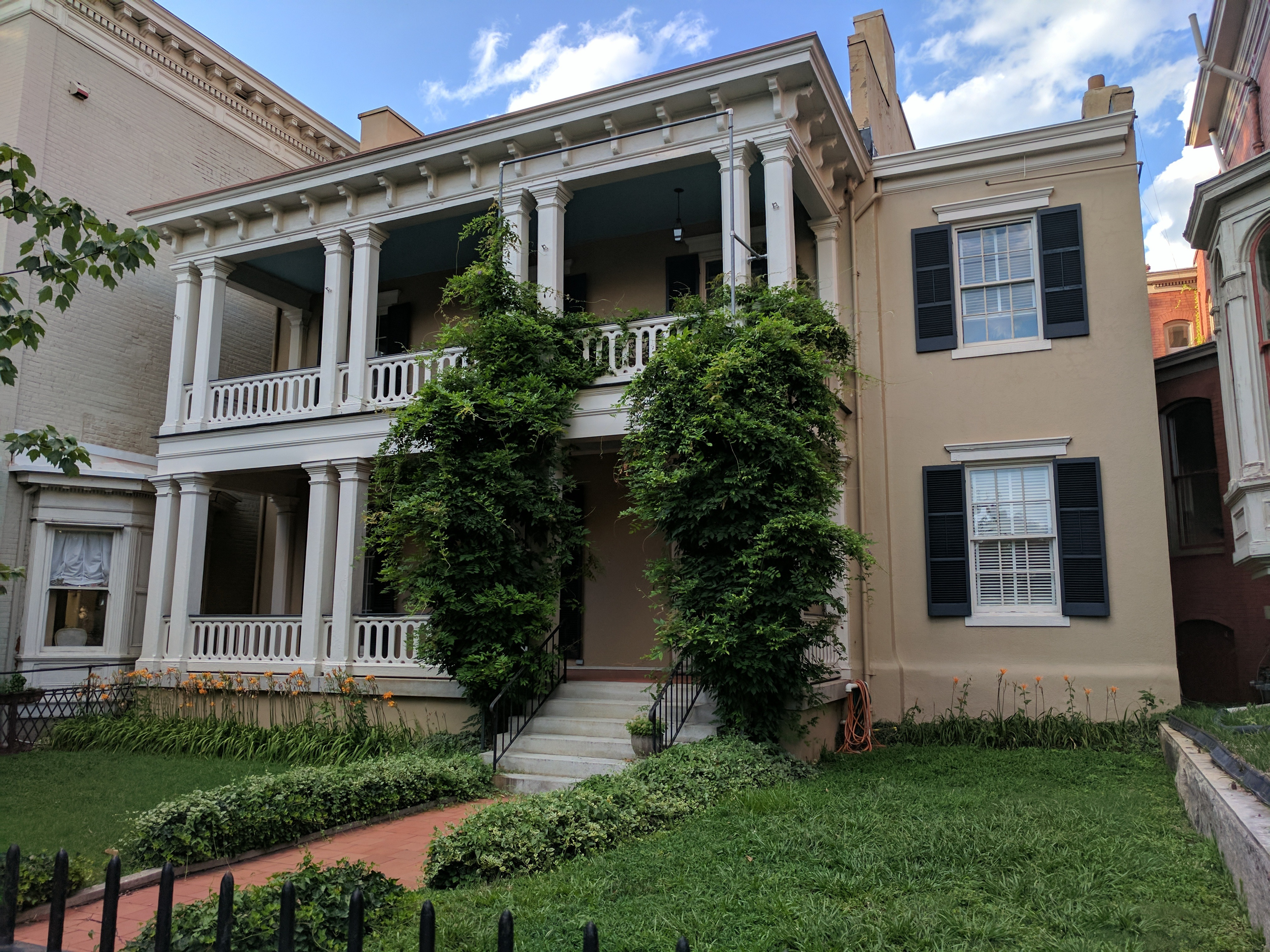
- State headquarters of Preservation Virginia on West Franklin Street in Monroe Ward.
- Interactive map of Monroe Ward
- Coordinates: 37°32′47″N 77°26′40″W
- Country: United States
- State: Virginia
- City: Richmond
- Time zone: UTC−04:00 (Eastern Daylight Time)
  - Summer (DST): UTC−05:00 (Eastern Standard Time)
- ZIP code: 23219
- Area code: 804
- ISO 3166 code: 1

Monroe Ward is a historic neighborhood in Downtown Richmond. It is east of the Fan district and includes several apartment buildings, usually with VCU students living in them. Recently, VCU expanded its Monroe Park campus into the Monroe Ward with the Engineering East/Snead Hall building, as well as an under construction residence hall and parking deck. The historic Jefferson Hotel is located in the Monroe Ward. The culture-filled area is situated between the Fan area and Downtown.
