= Virginia Statute for Religious Freedom =

Law guaranteeing freedom of religion

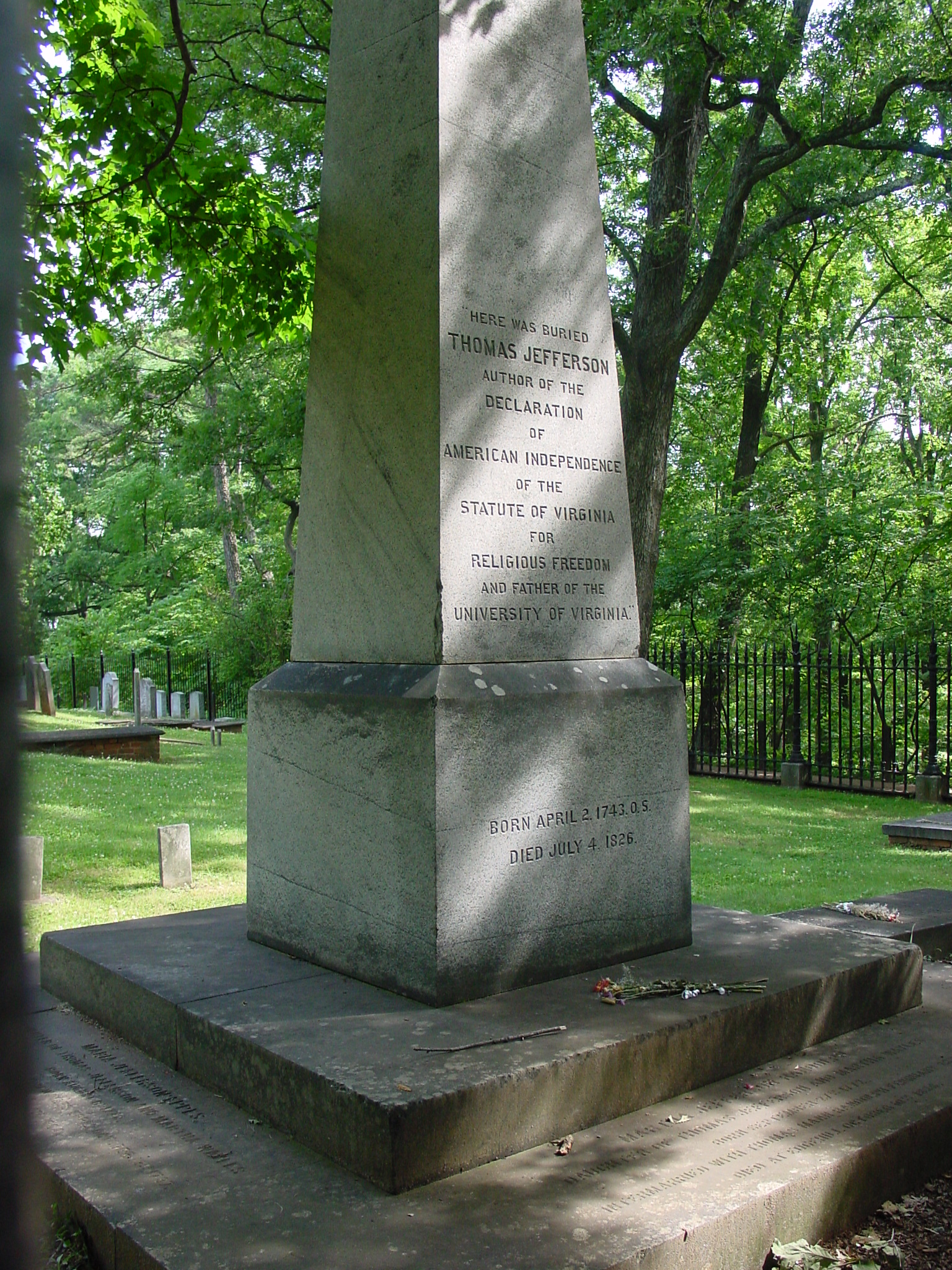
Jefferson's tombstone. The inscription, as he stipulated, reads "Here was buried Thomas Jefferson, author of the Declaration of American Independence, of the Statute of Virginia for Religious Freedom, and father of the University of Virginia."

The Virginia Statute for Religious Freedom was drafted in 1777 by Thomas Jefferson in Fredericksburg, Virginia, and introduced into the Virginia General Assembly in Richmond in 1779. On January 16, 1786, the Assembly enacted the statute into the state's law. The statute disestablished the Church of England in Virginia and guaranteed freedom of religion to people of all religious faiths, including Christians of all denominations, Jews, Muslims, and Hindus. The statute was a notable precursor of the Establishment Clause and Free Exercise Clause of the First Amendment to the United States Constitution.

The Statute for Religious Freedom is one of only three accomplishments Jefferson instructed be put in his epitaph.

== Background ==
Written in 1777 and first introduced in 1779, Jefferson's statute was repeatedly overlooked in the Virginia Assembly until Patrick Henry introduced legislation titled "A Bill Establishing a Provision for Teachers of the Christian Religion" in 1784. James Madison and others led the opposition to Henry's bill which culminated in Madison's Memorial and Remonstrance against Religious Assessments, published on June 20, 1785. As noted by the Library of Congress, "Madison revived [Jefferson's statute] as an alternative to Henry's general assessment bill and guided it to passage in the Virginia Assembly in January 1786."

== Text of statute ==
An act for establishing religious Freedom.

Whereas, Almighty God hath created the mind free;

That all attempts to influence it by temporal punishments or burthens, or by civil incapacitations tend only to beget habits of hypocrisy and meanness, and therefore are a departure from the plan of the holy author of our religion, who being Lord, both of body and mind yet chose not to propagate it by coercions on either, as was in his Almighty power to do,

That the impious presumption of legislators and rulers, civil as well as ecclesiastical, who, being themselves but fallible and uninspired men have assumed dominion over the faith of others, setting up their own opinions and modes of thinking as the only true and infallible, and as such endeavouring to impose them on others, hath established and maintained false religions over the greatest part of the world and through all time;

That to compel a man to furnish contributions of money for the propagation of opinions, which he disbelieves is sinful and tyrannical;

That even the forcing him to support this or that teacher of his own religious persuasion is depriving him of the comfortable liberty of giving his contributions to the particular pastor, whose morals he would make his pattern, and whose powers he feels most persuasive to righteousness, and is withdrawing from the Ministry those temporary rewards, which, proceeding from an approbation of their personal conduct are an additional incitement to earnest and unremitting labours for the instruction of mankind;

That our civil rights have no dependence on our religious opinions any more than our opinions in physics or geometry,

That therefore the proscribing any citizen as unworthy the public confidence, by laying upon him an incapacity of being called to offices of trust and emolument, unless he profess or renounce this or that religious opinion, is depriving him injuriously of those privileges and advantages, to which, in common with his fellow citizens, he has a natural right,

That it tends only to corrupt the principles of that very Religion it is meant to encourage, by bribing with a monopoly of worldly honours and emoluments those who will externally profess and conform to it;

That though indeed, these are criminal who do not withstand such temptation, yet neither are those innocent who lay the bait in their way;

That to suffer the civil magistrate to intrude his powers into the field of opinion and to restrain the profession or propagation of principles on supposition of their ill tendency is a dangerous fallacy which at once destroys all religious liberty because he being of course judge of that tendency will make his opinions the rule of judgment and approve or condemn the sentiments of others only as they shall square with or differ from his own;

That it is time enough for the rightful purposes of civil government, for its officers to interfere when principles break out into overt acts against peace and good order;

And finally, that Truth is great, and will prevail if left to herself, that she is the proper and sufficient antagonist to error, and has nothing to fear from the conflict, unless by human interposition disarmed of her natural weapons free argument and debate, errors ceasing to be dangerous when it is permitted freely to contradict them:

Be it enacted by General Assembly that no man shall be compelled to frequent or support any religious worship, place, or ministry whatsoever, nor shall be enforced, restrained, molested, or burthened in his body or goods, nor shall otherwise suffer on account of his religious opinions or belief, but that all men shall be free to profess, and by argument to maintain, their opinions in matters of Religion, and that the same shall in no wise diminish, enlarge or affect their civil capacities. And though we well know that this Assembly elected by the people for the ordinary purposes of Legislation only, have no power to restrain the acts of succeeding Assemblies constituted with powers equal to our own, and that therefore to declare this act irrevocable would be of no effect in law; yet we are free to declare, and do declare that the rights hereby asserted, are of the natural rights of mankind, and that if any act shall be hereafter passed to repeal the present or to narrow its operation, such act will be an infringement of natural right.

== See also ==
- First Freedom Center
- Jefferson Bible
- National Religious Freedom Day
- Separation of church and state in the United States
- United States Bill of Rights
