= James Monroe Building =

Building in Richmond, Virginia, United States

Coordinates: 37°32′10.6″N 77°25′48.4″W

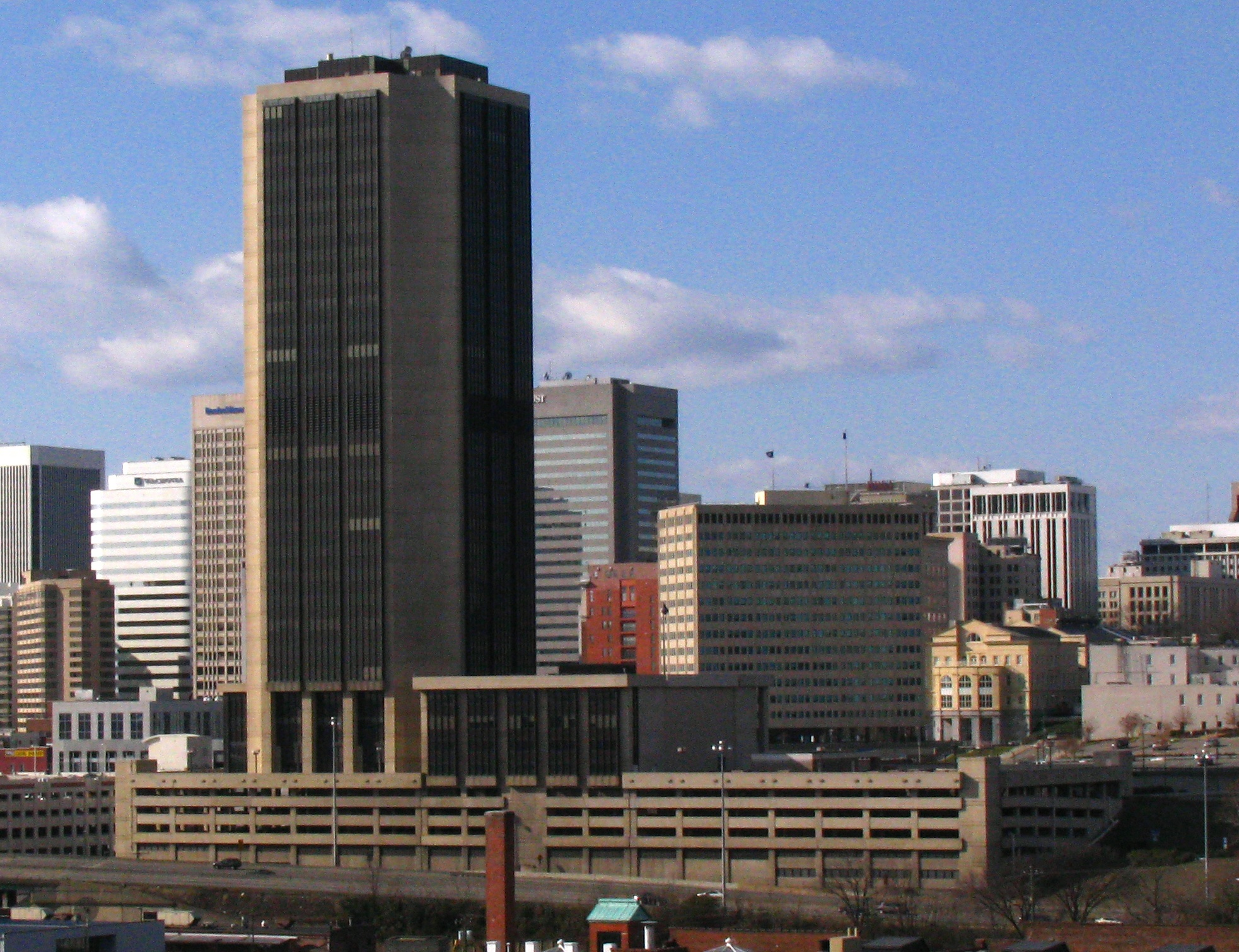
- View of the James Monroe building from the east. The right side of the large parking pedestal is where the second tower would have gone.
- Interactive map of the James Monroe Building area

General information
- Location: 101 North 14th Street
- Completed: 1981

Height
- Height: 449 ft (137 m)

Technical details
- Floor count: 29
- Floor area: 349,999 sq ft (32,516.0 m^{2})
- Lifts/elevators: 12

Design and construction
- Architects: Ballou, Justice & Upton Architects

The James Monroe Building is an office building located in Downtown Richmond, Virginia. It is the tallest building in Richmond at 137 meters (449 ft) and 29 floors. Only 25 of the floors, however, are actually occupiable as the top and middle two are maintenance floors. Although it is the tallest building in Richmond, its location at the bottom of a hill gives it the appearance of being roughly the same height as other buildings in the Richmond skyline. The building has a parking garage at its base and is located adjacent to Interstate 95.

Completed in 1981, the James Monroe Building was intended to have a twin tower at the North end of its parking garage but the recession of the early 1980s ended the project. It was the tallest building in Virginia from 1981 to 2007 when it was surpassed by The Westin Virginia Beach Town Center & Residences in Virginia Beach.

The state government plans to move all departments out of the building. As of 2023, whether or not a new building will be constructed to replace was still up in the air. This is due to building's age, requiring renovations that would be roughly equal in cost to new construction, issues with employees getting stuck in the elevator, and bathrooms that weren't compliant with the Americans with Disabilities Act.

As of early 2026, all government departments housed there have moved out or planned to do so, and the state government plans to build a new building for all the departments at 1401 East Broad Street and either sell or demolish the building. Former Governor Glenn Youngkin wanted to rent out office space instead, but lawmakers chose to build a new building due to a desire to invest in the city and centralize constituents' access to state government.

Departments formerly housed at the building include the Virginia Department of Education, Virginia Department of Veterans Services, Department of Small Business Supplier Diversity, Virginia Department of Health pharmacy services, Department of the Treasury, State Council of Higher Education for Virginia, the Auditor of Public Accounts, Office of the State Inspector General, Department of Accounts, Department of Taxation, Department of Human Resource Management, the Department of Transportation, Department of General Services' Information System Services, and the Human Resources clinic.
