= Brandt Hall =

Warren W. Brandt Hall
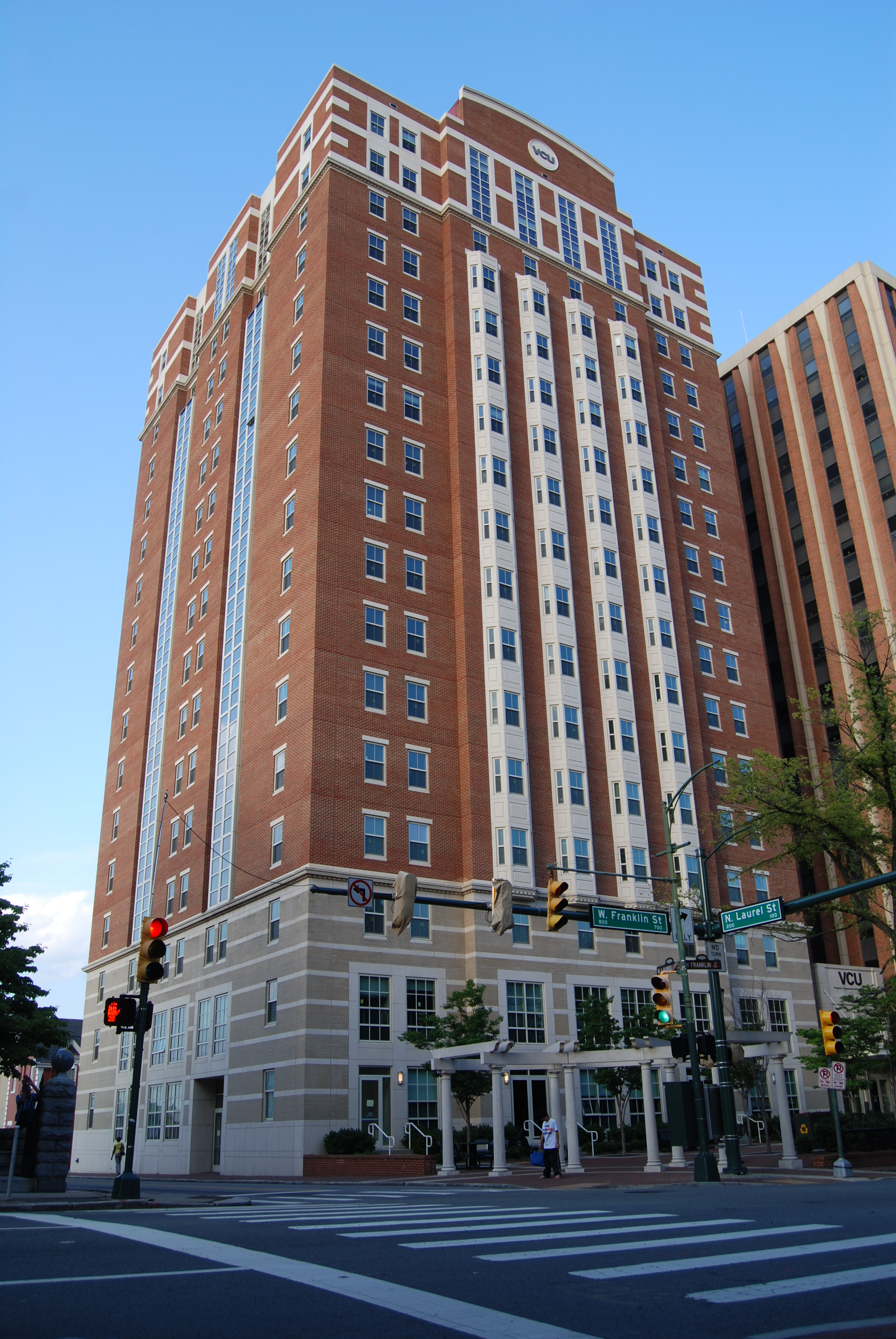
- Interactive map of the Warren W. Brandt Hall area

General information
- Type: College residence hall
- Location: 710 West Franklin Street; Richmond, Virginia 23220
- Coordinates: 37.5483°N 77.4504°W
- Construction started: 2003
- Completed: 2005
- Opening: August 24, 2005
- Cost: $28 million

Technical details
- Floor count: 17
- Lifts/elevators: 3

Design and construction
- Main contractor: W.M. Jordan Co.

Warren W. Brandt Hall is a 17-story dormitory, that is located on the northeast corner of the Virginia Commonwealth University Monroe Park campus. The building is adjacent to Rhoads Hall, and houses 640 freshmen students. The building was dedicated on August 24, 2005 and opened for the 2005–06 academic school year, being the newest residence building on campus until the construction of Gladding Residence Center, Phase III.

The building is named in Warren W. Brandt, who was the first president of VCU.
