= Armada Hoffler Tower =

High-rise office building in Virginia, United States

Coordinates: 36°50′33.5″N 76°8′0.6″W

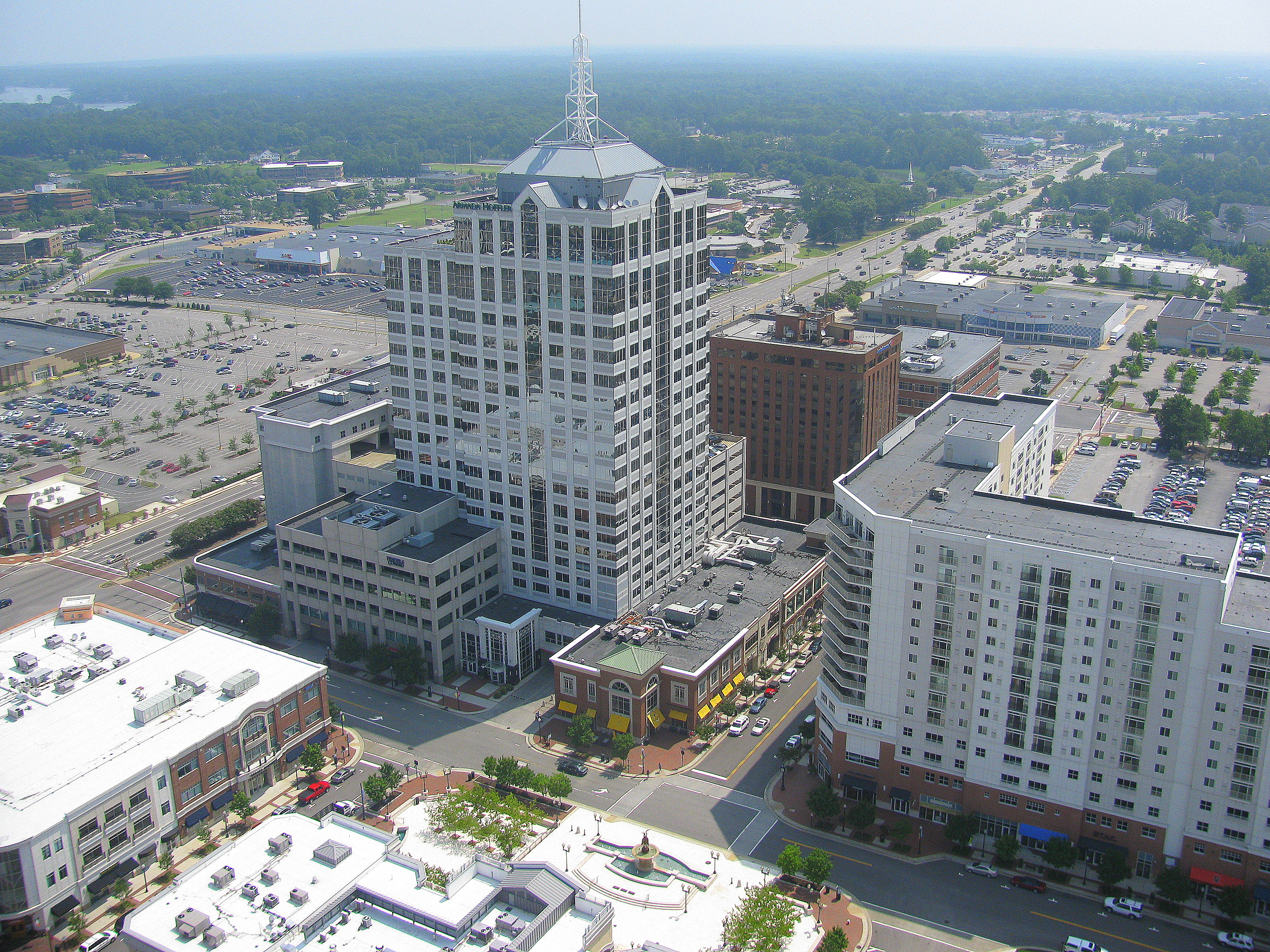
Armada Hoffler Tower, 2010

The Armada Hoffler Tower is a high rise multi-office building in Town Center, Virginia Beach, Virginia. Opened in 2003, it is known as the first building built in the new Virginia Beach Town Center. The 23 story tower is 396 feet (121 meters) tall. It is also the home of the local news station WTKR's secondary studio.
