= Shockoe Slip =

- Shockoe Slip Historic District
- U.S. National Register of Historic Places
- U.S. Historic district
- Virginia Landmarks Register
- Richmond City Historic District
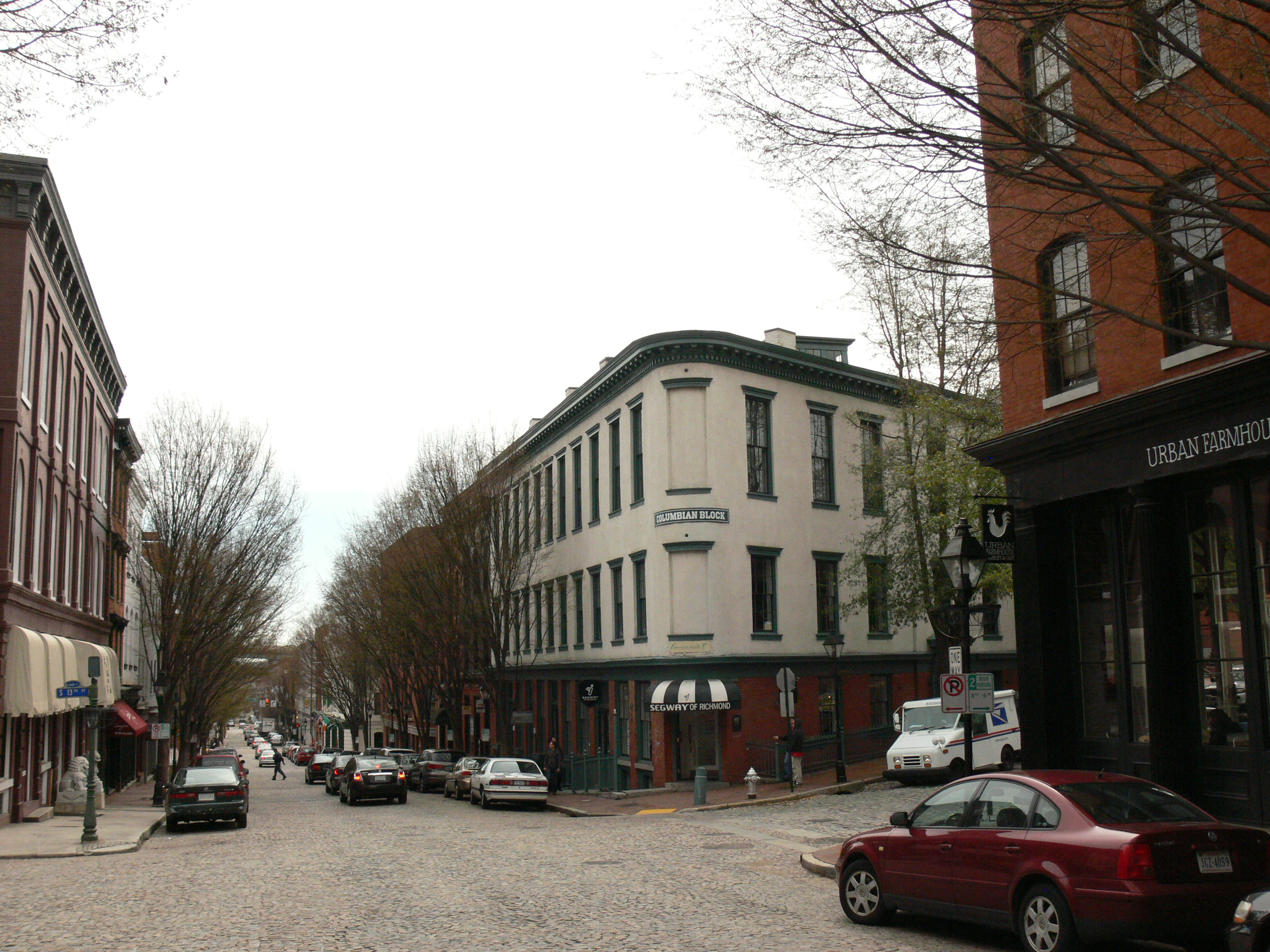
- view facing the Columbian Block
- Location: Roughly along E. Cary St. between S. 14th and S. 12 Sts. (Original); Roughly bounded by Seaboard RR tracks, Downtown Expressway, Main, Dock, and 12th Sts. (Increase I); 11-15 and 101 South 15th St., 1433 East Main St. (Increase II);Richmond, Virginia
- Coordinates: 37°32′5″N 77°26′0″W
- Area: 10 acres (4.0 ha)21 acres (8.5 ha)3.5 acres (1.4 ha)
- Architectural style: Italianate
- NRHP reference No.: 72001526 (original); 83003307 (increase 1); 05000916 (increase 2)
- VLR No.: 127-0219

Significant dates
- Added to NRHP: March 29, 1972
- Boundary increases: April 20, 1983; August 24, 2005
- Designated VLR: November 16, 1971; July 20, 1982; June 1, 2005; June 21, 2012

Shockoe Slip is a district in the downtown area of Richmond, Virginia. The name "slip" referred to a narrow passageway leading from Main Street to where goods were loaded and unloaded from the former James River and Kanawha Canal. The rough boundaries of Shockoe Slip include 14th Street, Main Street, Canal Street and 12th Street.

Architecturally, many of the buildings in Shockoe Slip were constructed during the rebuilding following the Evacuation Fire of 1865, especially in a commercial variant of the Italianate style. It is centered on a 1909 fountain, dedicated to "one who loved animals." The buildings in the district, which historically housed a variety of offices, wholesale and retail establishments, are now primarily restaurants, shops, offices, and apartments.

== History ==
Shockoe Slip began developing in the late 18th century following the move of the state capital to Richmond, aided by the construction of Mayo's bridge across the James River (ultimately succeeded by the modern 14th Street Bridge), as well as the siting of key tobacco industry structures, such as the public warehouse, tobacco scales, and the Federal Customs House in or near the district.

On the eve of the fall of Richmond to the Union Army in April 1865, evacuating Confederate forces were ordered to set fire to the city's tobacco warehouses. The fires spread, and completely destroyed Shockoe Slip and several other districts. The district was quickly rebuilt in the late 1860s, flourishing further in the 1870s, and forming much of its present historic building stock.

The district began declining in the 1920s, as other areas of the city rose in prominence with the advent of the automobile. Numerous structures would be demolished and cleared, including (in the 1950s), the Tobacco Exchange, which had been at the heart of the district.

=== Redevelopment: 1970s to present ===
Beginning in the 1960s and accelerating in the 1970s, Shockoe Slip was redeveloped as a commercial and entertainment district; the nightlife district came just after Richmond passed liquor-by-the-drink laws, and when the so-called fern bar became popular across the United States. The restoration came at the time of an increased interest in historic preservation around the time of the Bicentennial, with the district being added to the National Register of Historic Places in 1972. Early pioneer restaurants included The Tobacco Company, Stuffy's Going Bananas, Commercial Cafe and Sam Miller's, the last two being revived restaurant names from Richmond's 19th century.

One of the earliest and oldest of Richmond's artist-run galleries, was Artspace 1306 located at 1306 East Cary Street in Shockoe Slip. Artspace 1306 retained its original name when the gallery moved to North 18th Street in Shockoe Bottom. Only when Artspace 1306 moved to 6 East Broad Street did the gallery drop the original address from its name. The Broad Street location became the home of another 501 C-3 gallery, Art6 Gallery, when Artspace moved to Plant Zero in the Manchester area of the city.

Shockoe Slip also included some of the earliest rehabilitated downtown apartments; at the time of the restoration asphalt paving was removed to expose historic Belgian block streets.

Shockoe Slip continues to be a popular place to live and work. The Martin Agency has maintained its headquarters in Shockoe Slip since 1997. In 2015 digital marketing agency Workshop Digital relocated to the Turning Basin Building in Shockoe Slip, and in 2016 CarMax relocated 125 designers, developers, and programmers to the adjacent Lady Byrd Hat building. Residential development surrounding the James River continues with the influx of students and professionals and an increased interest in urban living.

Shockoe Slip was the site of the passage of the Virginia Statute for Religious Freedom. To commemorate this event the First Freedom Center opened there in 2015.

== See also ==
- Shockoe Bottom
