= First National Bank Building (Richmond, Virginia) =

Historic commercial building in Virginia, United States

- U.S. National Register of Historic Places
- U.S. Historic district – Contributing property
- Virginia Landmarks Register
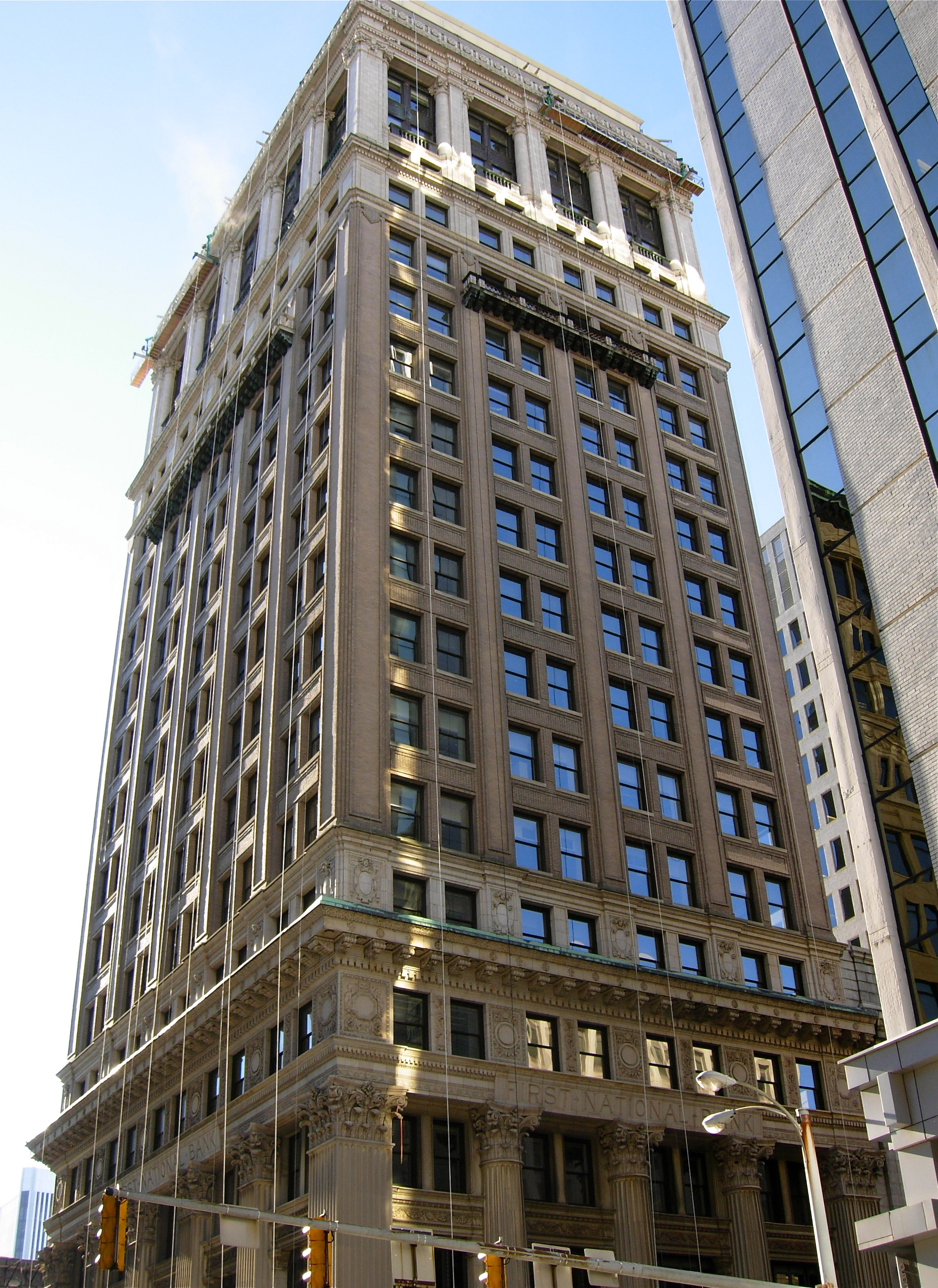
- First National Bank Building, January 2012

- Location within Virginia
- Location: 825--27 East Main St., Richmond, Virginia
- Coordinates: 37°32′17″N 77°26′13″W
- Area: 0.2 acres (0.081 ha)
- Built: 1912-1913
- Architect: Bossom, Alfred Charles; Clinton, Charles W.
- Architectural style: Neo-classical Revival
- NRHP reference No.: 82004586
- VLR No.: 127-0381

Significant dates
- Added to NRHP: April 12, 1982
- Designated VLR: February 26, 1982

First National Bank Building (also known as the Old First and Merchants National Bank Building and BB&T Bank Building) is a historic bank and high-rise office building located at 823 East Main Street in Richmond, Virginia, United States. It was designed by architect Alfred Bossom and built in 1912–1913. It is a 19-story, four bay by five bay, Classical Revival style steel frame building clad in brick, limestone, and granite. The building features rich architectural ornament that follows the Corinthian order both within and without. It was the first high-rise office tower to be built in Richmond. The First & Merchants Bank would eventually become Sovran Bank.

It was listed on the National Register of Historic Places in 1982. It is located in the Main Street Banking Historic District.

== See also ==
- List of tallest buildings in Richmond, Virginia
