= Central National Bank (Richmond, Virginia) =

Historic commercial building in Virginia, United States

- U.S. National Register of Historic Places
- U.S. Historic district – Contributing property
- Virginia Landmarks Register
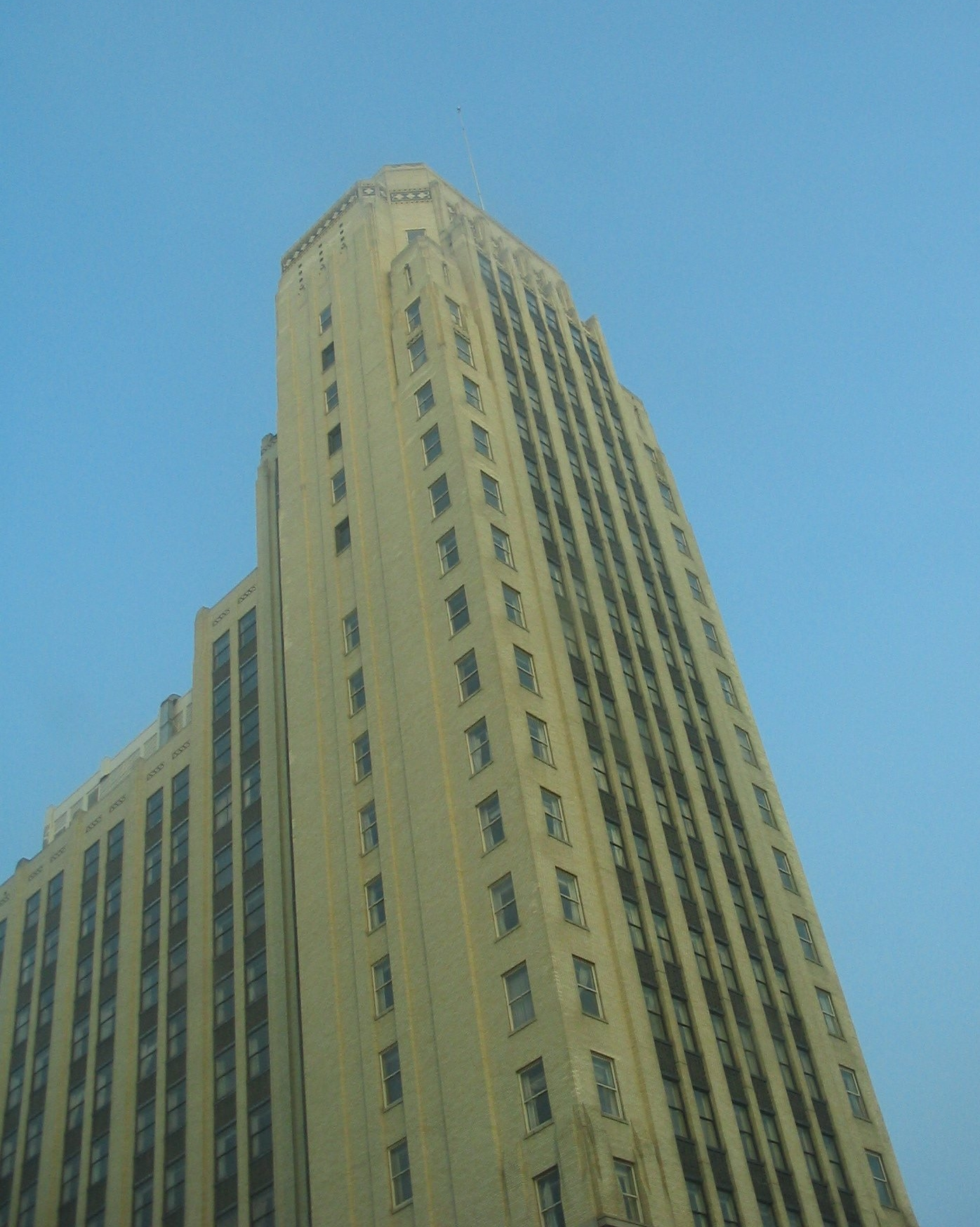
- Location: 3rd and Broad Sts., Richmond, Virginia
- Coordinates: 37°32′37″N 77°26′24″W
- Area: less than one acre
- Built: 1929
- Architect: John Eberson
- Architectural style: Art Deco
- Part of: Broad Street Commercial Historic District (#87000611); Grace Street Commercial Historic District (#98000739)
- NRHP reference No.: 79003290
- VLR No.: 127-0309

Significant dates
- Designated NRHP: September 20, 1979
- Designated CP: April 09, 1987; July 13, 1998
- Designated VLR: April 18, 1978

The Central National Bank building is a 23-story (282 ft) Art Deco skyscraper located in Richmond, Virginia. Completed in 1929, it was one of the first skyscrapers in the city of Richmond not in the heart of the financial district. According to architectural historian Richard Guy Wilson, it and the West Hospital building, are the only two skyscrapers in Richmond to have used the fashionable Art Deco ziggurat-inspired setback, and only a few others exist elsewhere in Virginia. When the bank later changed hands, it was known as the Central Fidelity Bank. It was used as a branch bank for Wachovia Corp. until that closed in 2000. After nearly fifteen years of vacancy, it was converted into apartments, and the first resident moved into the building in mid-2016. The redevelopment is called to "Deco at CNB," a 200-apartment development by Douglas Development Corp.

It was added to the National Register of Historic Places in 1979. It is located in the Grace Street Commercial Historic District.

== History ==
At the end of the 19th and into the 20th century, Richmond, Virginia was rapidly growing. Broad Street (its roughly 115 feet (35 m) width double the average in the city) divided the more trendy southern neighborhood centered on Grace and Franklin Streets from Jackson Ward, which shifted in demographics during this period from a German and Jewish neighborhood to an African American one. Because of the barrier created by the transportation lines and traffic along the street, the north and south sides of Broad developed a different character; the southern side saw more trendy and monumental commercial and retail developments.

The Central National Bank was founded in 1911 by a coalition of Broad Street and nearby Grace Street business owners who wanted a convenient banking location. Within six months, deposits at the new bank totaled over US$500,000, and by the 1920s the bank was the sixth largest bank in Richmond. The bank's directors voted to construct a new building on Broad Street in 1928.

== See also ==
- Allied Arts Building
