= Truist Place (Richmond) =

Office building in Richmond, Virginia

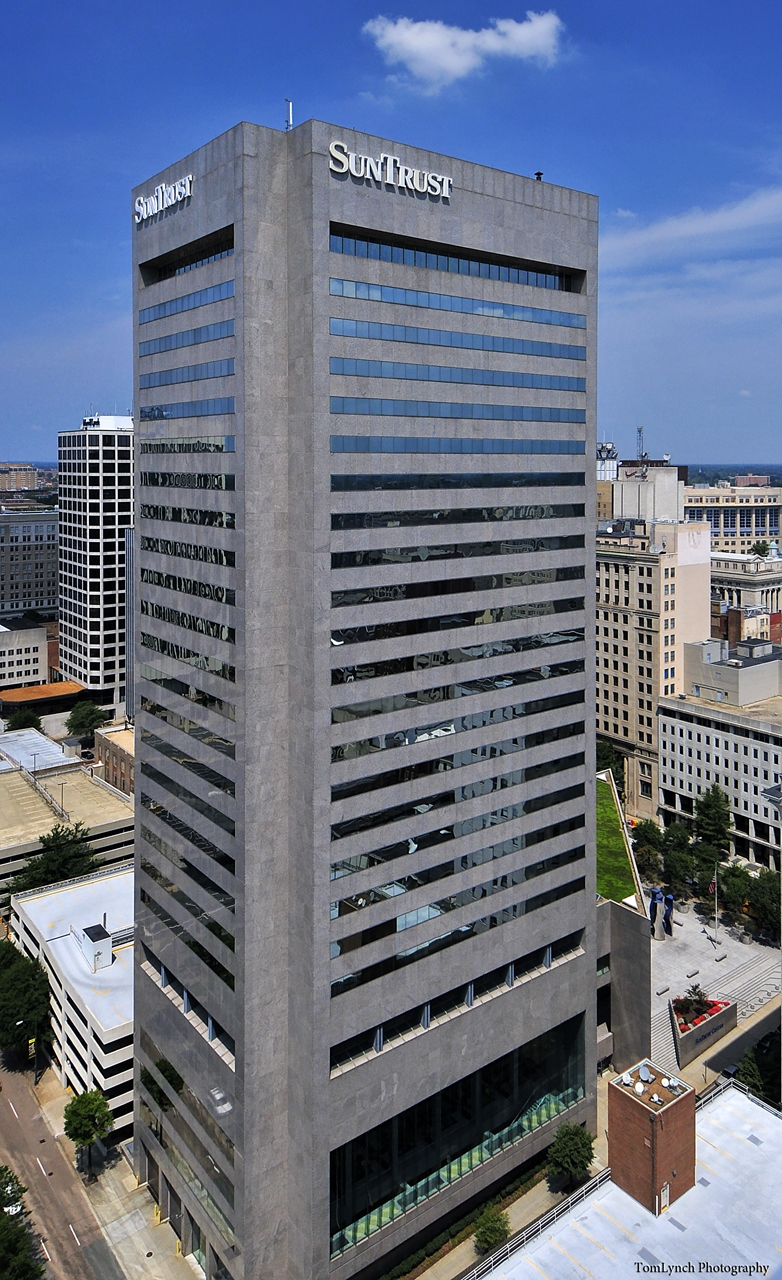
- Interactive map of the Truist Place area

General information
- Status: Completed
- Type: Office
- Location: 919 East Main Street; Richmond, Virginia 23219
- Coordinates: 37°32′15.7″N 77°26′9.4″W
- Construction started: 1981
- Completed: 1983
- Opening: 1983

Height
- Roof: 400 ft (120 m)

Technical details
- Floor count: 26
- Lifts/elevators: 12

Design and construction
- Architects: Davis Carter Scott, Ltd.

Truist Place is a 26-story office building in Richmond, Virginia. It is the third tallest building in Richmond, and the sixth tallest in Virginia. Construction costs were relatively high due to being clad in granite.

== History ==
Truist Place occupies a block that was once the site of a carriage manufacturer known as Ainslie's Carriage Works along with other miscellaneous shops. In 1912, these structures were demolished to make room for the United Virginia Bank Insurance Headquarters. This building was subsequently demolished in 1981. In 1983, the current building was topped out and was established as the headquarters of the United Virginia Bank (UVB). A sculpture known as Quadrature was created by artist Robert Engman in 1985 and currently sits in front of the building.

Later, UVB changed its name to Crestar Financial Corporation and thus the name of the building was changed to the Crestar Bank Headquarters. Crestar was acquired by SunTrust in 1998, whereupon the building was renamed SunTrust Center. The building was renamed Truist Place in late 2021 after SunTrust merged with BB&T to form Truist.
