= Economy of the Washington metropolitan area =

Key business districts in the Washington metropolitan area

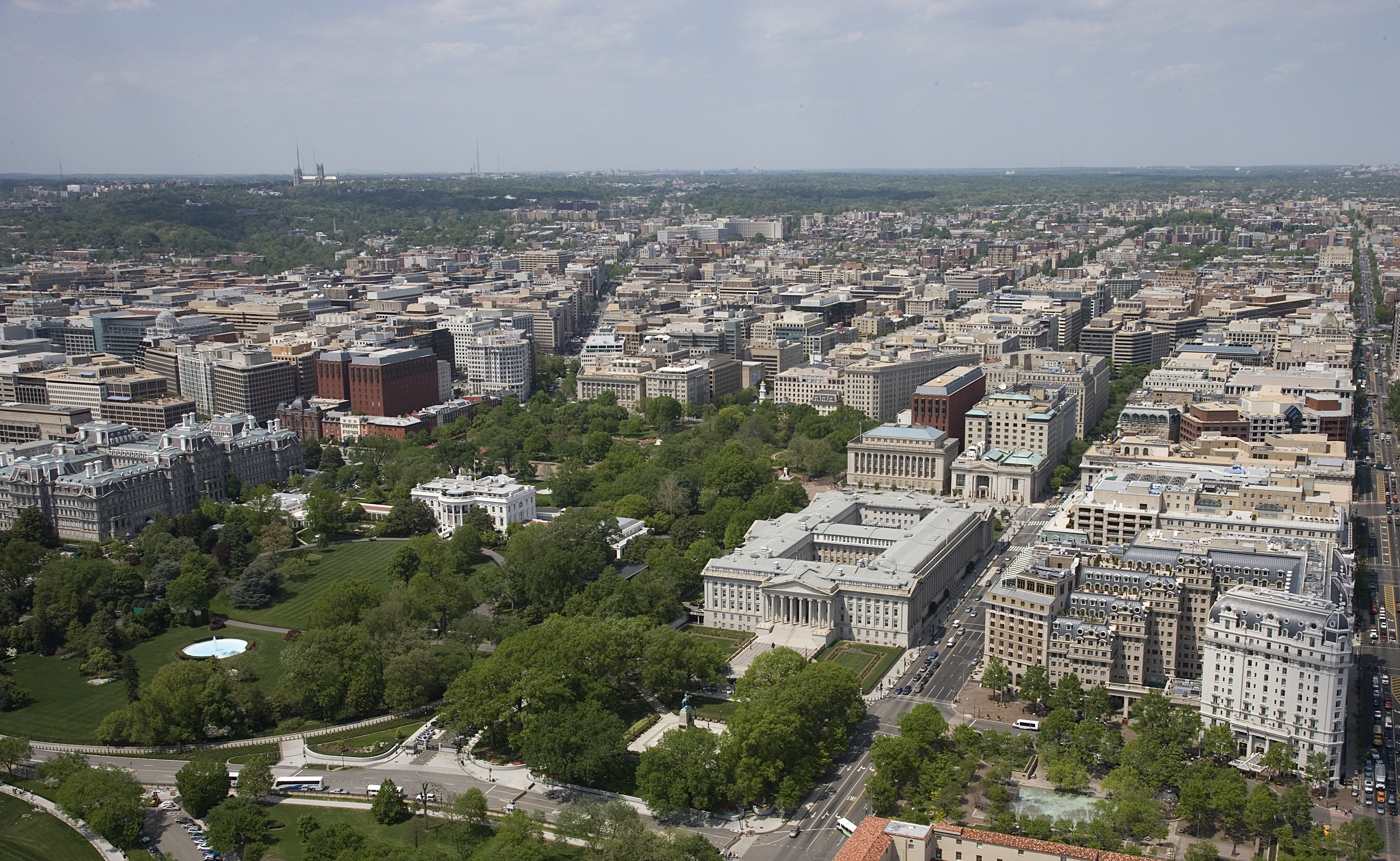
Downtown Washington, D.C.

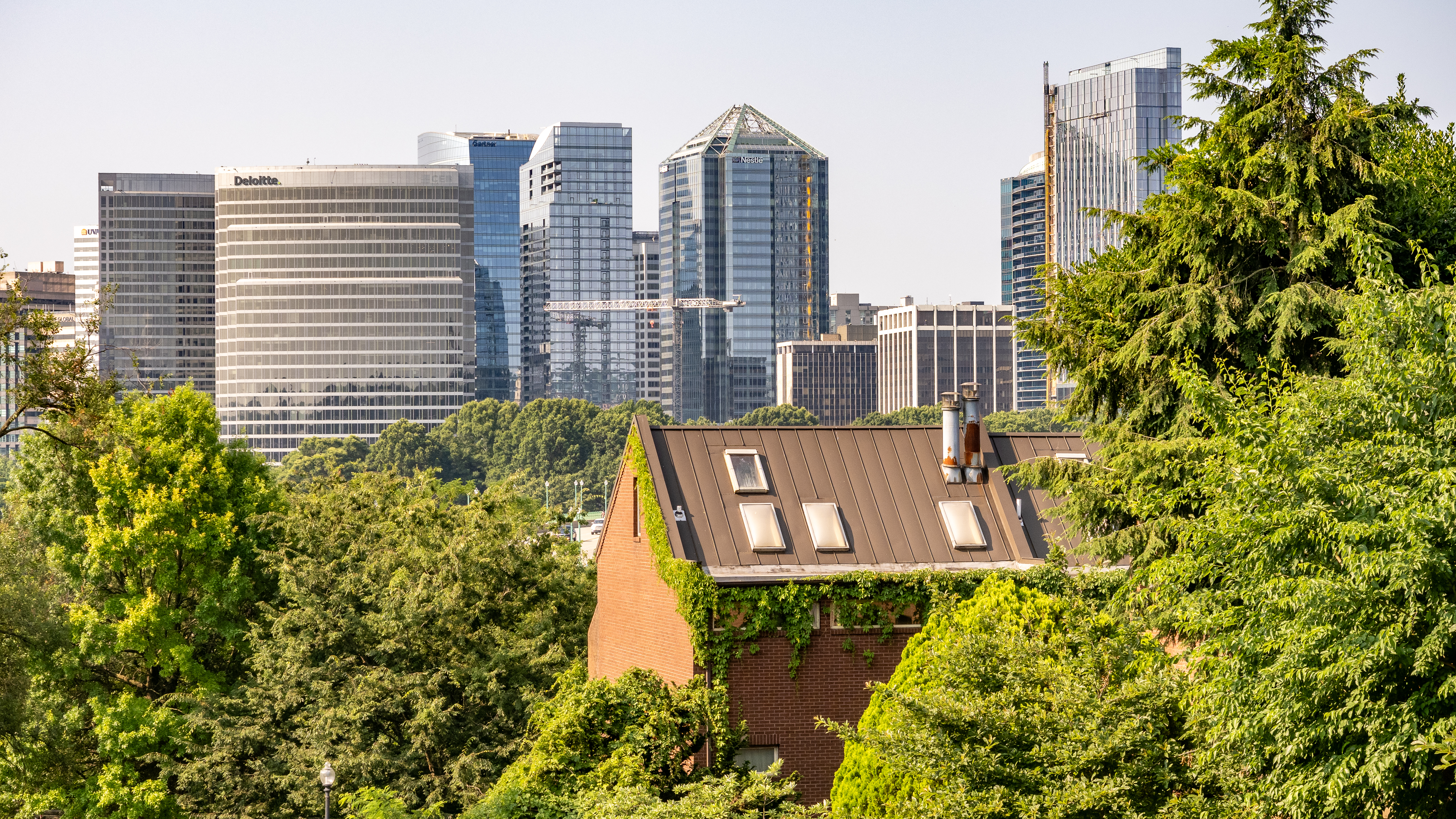
Rosslyn, Virginia

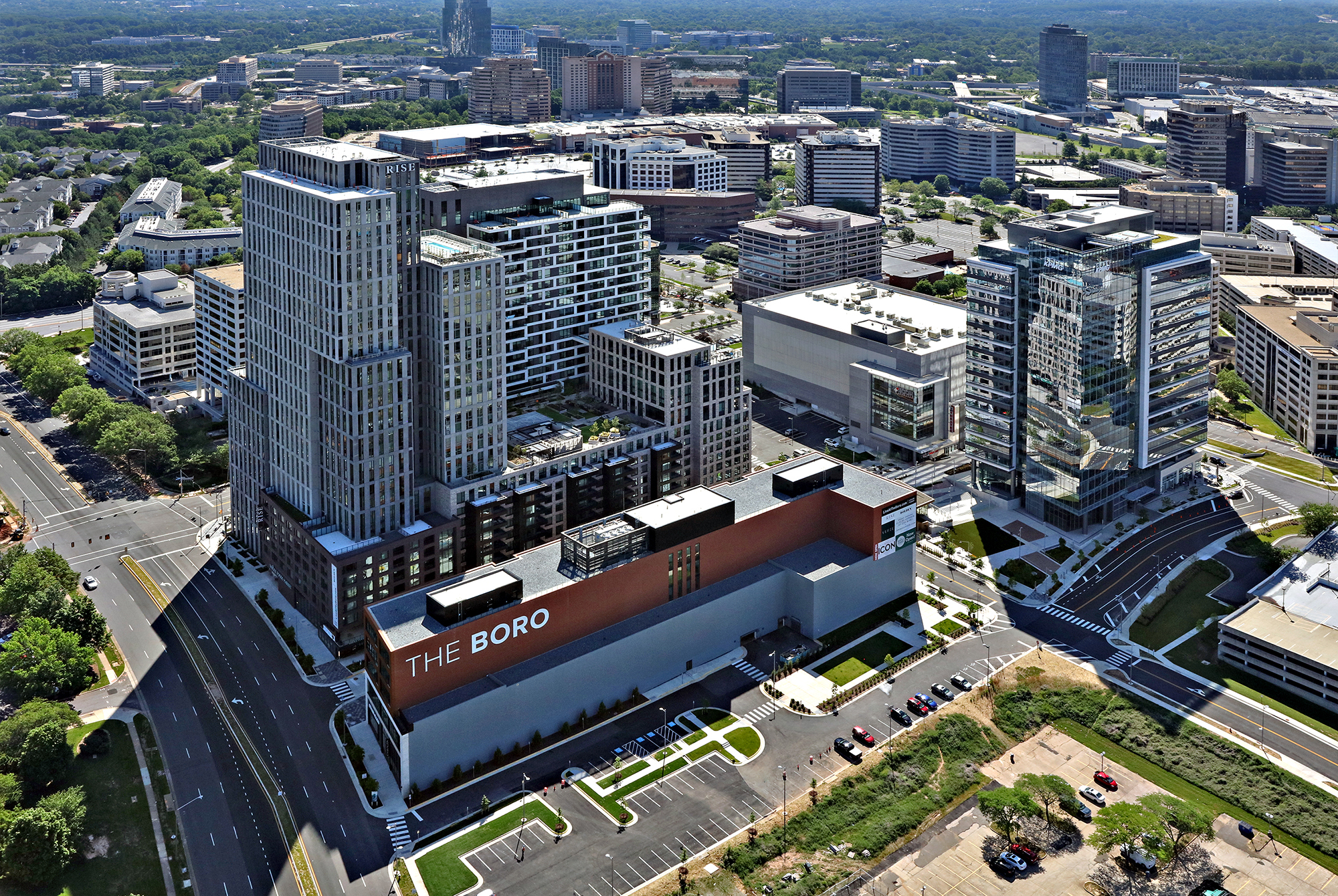
Tysons, Virginia

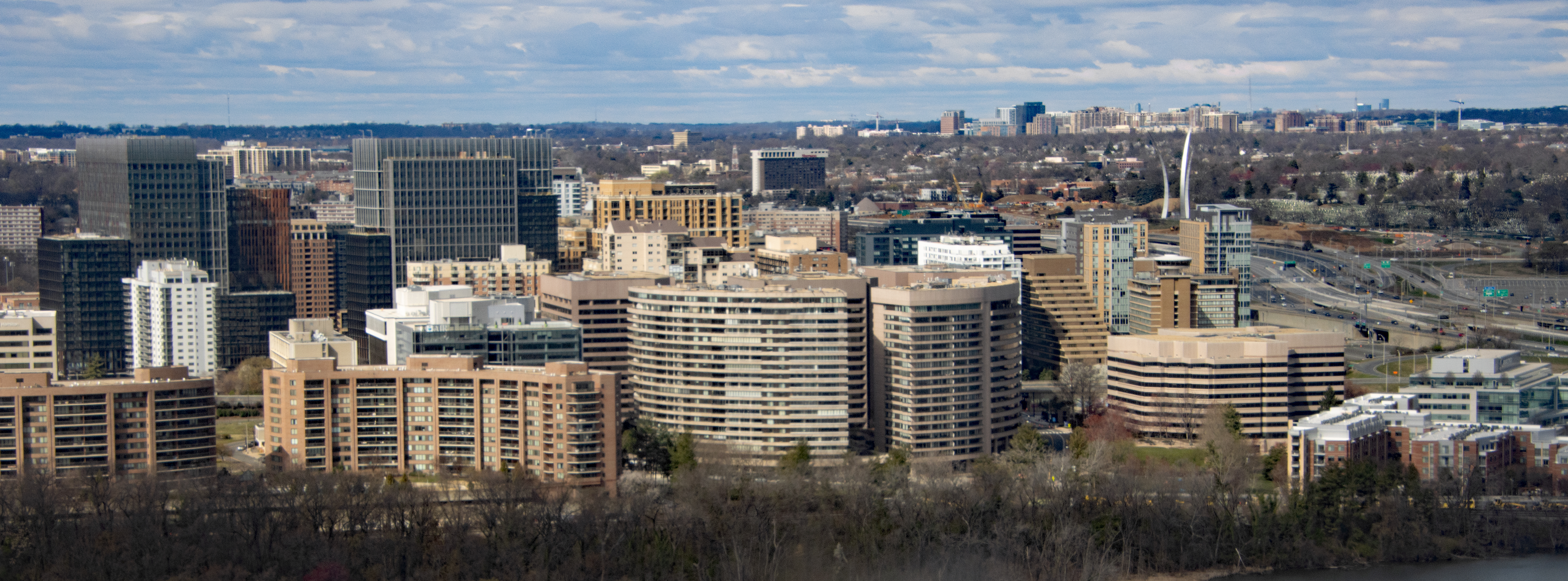
Crystal City, Virginia

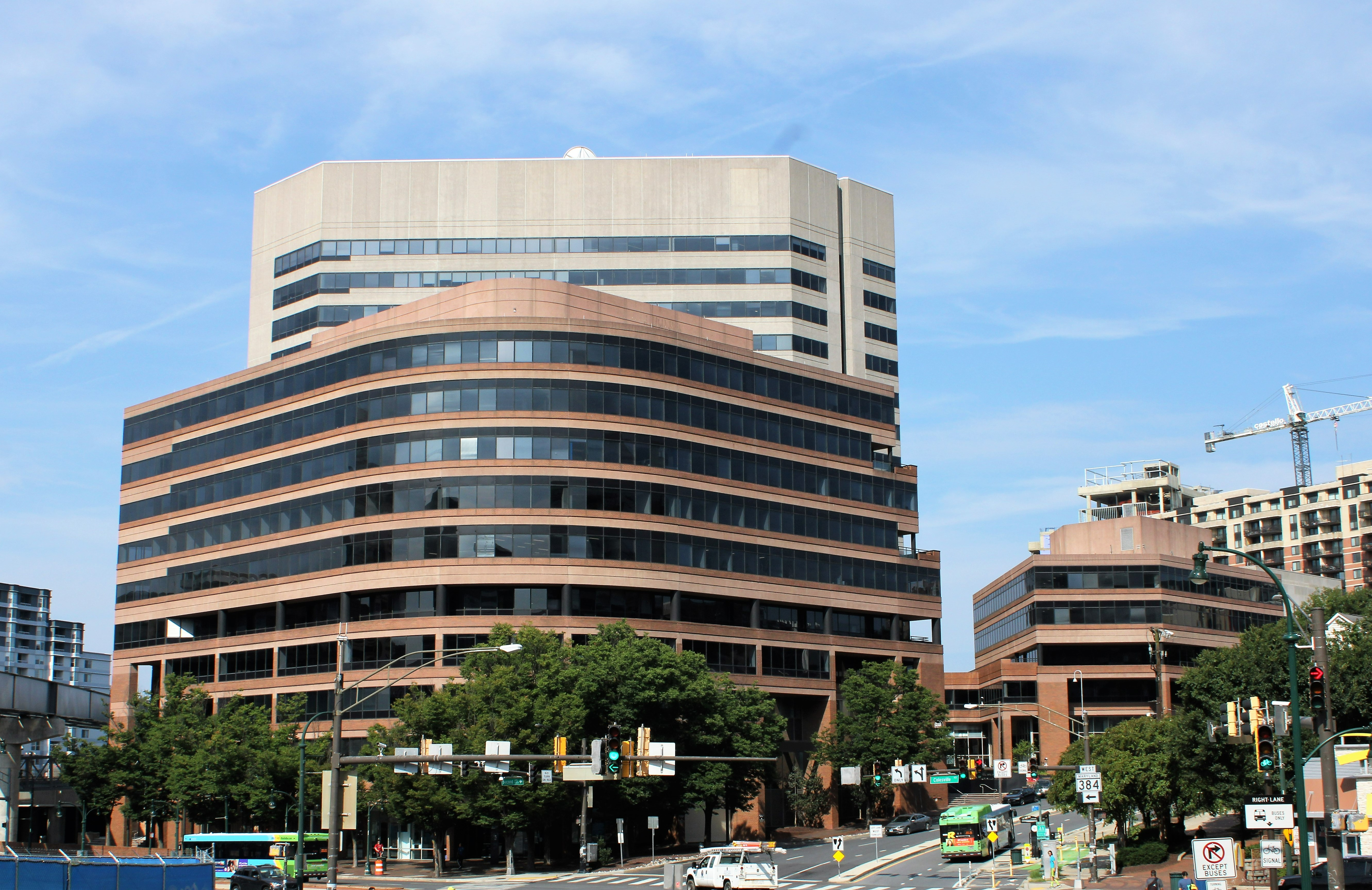
Silver Spring, Maryland

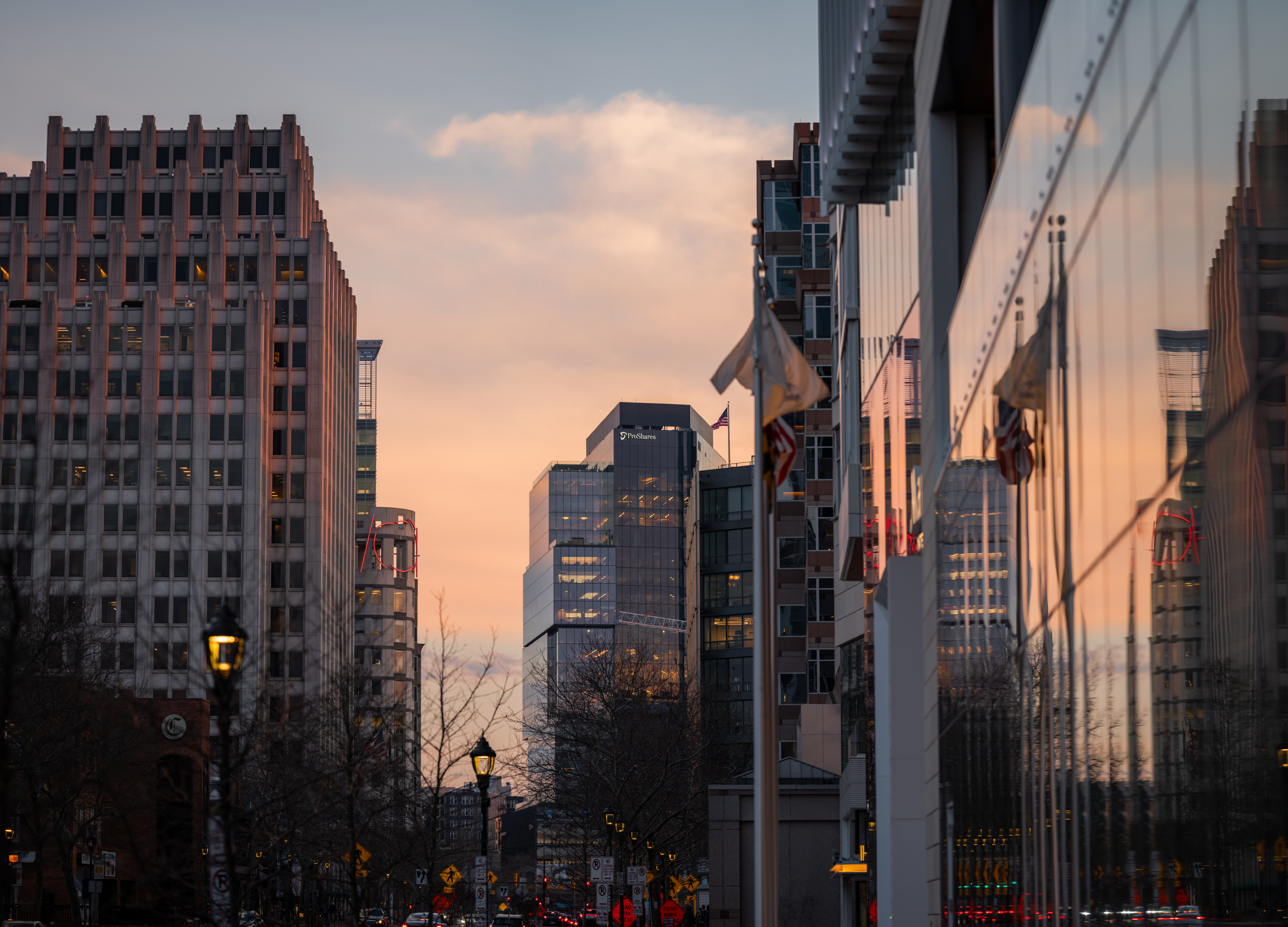
Bethesda, Maryland

The economy of the Washington metropolitan area includes the economy of Washington, D.C., and its suburbs, including parts of Maryland, all of Northern Virginia, and Jefferson County, West Virginia. Washington, D.C. accounts for 25.2% of the metropolitan area's economy, while northern Virginia accounts for the largest share at 45.1%. In 2022, the DC metro area had the country's fifth-highest gross metropolitan product, at $541 billion. The region's economy is highly diverse and includes the principal industries of the US federal government, tourism, information technology, research, hospitality, news media, and bioscience.

Key commercial hubs in the Greater Washington area include Downtown, Washington, D.C., Tysons, Virginia, Rosslyn, Virginia, Crystal City, Virginia, Bethesda, Maryland, and Silver Spring, Maryland.

As of 2022, according to Washington's comprehensive annual financial report, the top employers by number of employees in the region in 2022 were Georgetown University, Children's National Medical Center, Washington Hospital Center, George Washington University, American University, Georgetown University Hospital, Booz Allen Hamilton, Insperity PEO Services, Universal Protection Service, Howard University, Medstar Medical Group, George Washington University Hospital, Catholic University of America, and Sibley Memorial Hospital.

== Fortune 500 companies ==
As of 2026, the Washington metropolitan area is home to the headquarters of 20 Fortune 500 companies across a number of different industries. The DC area is also home to many satellite offices for major companies, and serves as the US or North American headquarters for many foreign companies, such as Volkswagen, Rolls-Royce, Airbus, Nestlé, Ethiopian Airlines, and Lidl. Other major companies headquartered in the area that are not on the Fortune 500 list because they are either private companies, subsidiaries, or credit unions include Mars Inc. (maker of M&M's, Snickers, Skittles; one of the largest private companies in the United States), Bechtel, Geico, PenFed Credit Union, Northwest Federal Credit Union, and Navy Federal Credit Union.

Fortune 500 companies headquartered in the Washington metropolitan area
Rank	Company Name	Location	Industry
1	Amazon (Note: Amazon is co-headquartered between Seattle, Washington and the National Landing area of Arlington, Virginia.)	National Landing, Virginia	Technology, Retail
26	Fannie Mae	Washington, D.C.	Financial services, Mortgage-backed securities
33	Freddie Mac	Tysons, Virginia	Financial services, Mortgage-backed securities
47	Boeing	Crystal City, Virginia	Commercial aviation, Aerospace, Defense
49	RTX Corporation	Rosslyn, Virginia	Aerospace, Defense
61	Lockheed Martin	Bethesda, Maryland	Aerospace, Defense
63	Capital One	Tysons, Virginia	Financial services, Banking
91	General Dynamics	Reston, Virginia	Aerospace, Defense
112	Northrop Grumman	West Falls Church, Virginia	Aerospace, Defense
171	Marriott International	Bethesda, Maryland	Hospitality
180	Danaher Corporation	Washington, D.C.	Conglomerate, Medical products, Life sciences
260	Leidos	Reston, Virginia	Technology
313	Amentum	Chantilly, Virginia	Technology, Engineering
315	DXC Technology	Ashburn, Virginia	Technology
328	Venture Global LNG	Rosslyn, Virginia	Energy
358	AES Corporation	Ballston, Virginia	Energy
367	Hilton Worldwide	Tysons, Virginia	Hospitality
372	Booz Allen Hamilton	Tysons, Virginia	Management and technology consulting
409	NVR	Reston, Virginia	Home construction
459	CACI International	Reston, Virginia	Technology

== Federal government ==
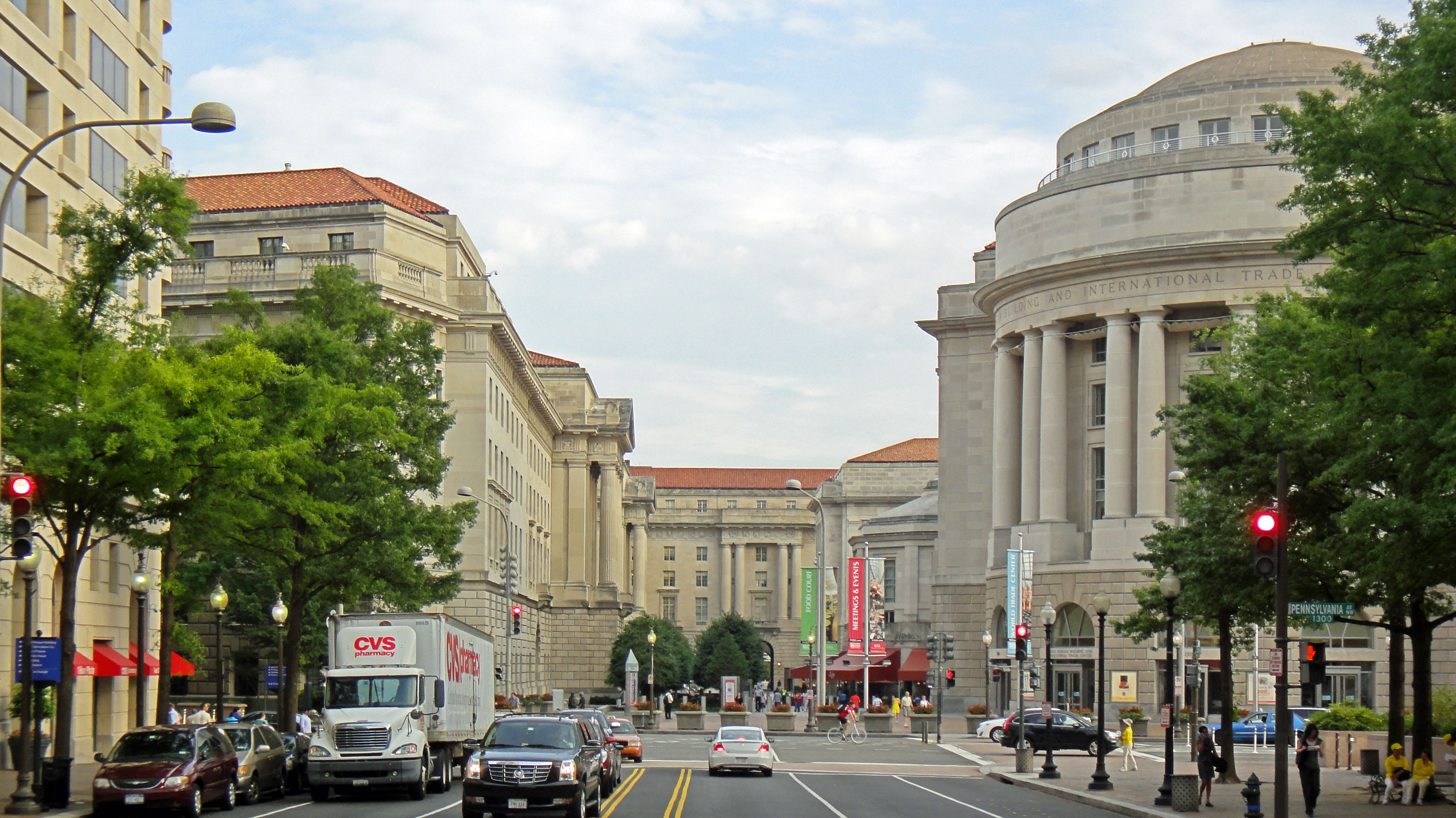
Federal Triangle, where many key federal government agencies and departments are headquartered

As the national capital of the United States, the country's federal government is headquartered in the city, and is therefore a major employer and important economic engine for the broader region. As of July 2022, 25% of people employed in Washington, D.C., were federal government employees. Important federal government agencies and departments are also located in suburban Washington. The Pentagon, which houses the US Department of Defense, is headquartered in Arlington County, Virginia, and the CIA is headquartered in the Langley area of Fairfax County, Virginia.

In addition to people employed directly by the federal government, the region also has many people employed in organizations whose work relies directly on funding from or contracting with the federal government, or in some other way interacts directly with the government. Many lobbying organizations seek to influence US government policy. Similarly, the region has a high concentration of law firms headquartered in the area or with major offices in the region that work with the federal government as well as with other institutions and industries. Historically, K Street was where many of the city's lobbying organizations were located, and is therefore sometimes used as a metonym for lobbying of the US federal government. Among the key lobbying and law firms include Brownstein Hyatt Farber Schreck, Akin Gump Strauss Hauer & Feld, and Holland & Knight.

In addition to important law firms and lobbying organizations, many other organizations rely on the federal government for employment as a result of receiving funding directly from the government or using their work with the government to encourage private donors to support their mission. These include defense contractors, civilian contractors, nonprofit organizations, trade unions, industry trade groups, and professional associations, many of which have their headquarters in the Washington area so they can be close to the federal government.

As of February 2022, the largest U.S. government agencies located in the Washington Metropolitan Area are: the United States Department of Defense headquartered in the Pentagon in Arlington, Virginia, the United States Postal Service, the United States Department of Veterans Affairs, the United States Department of Homeland Security, and the United States Department of Justice.

== Defense, aviation, and aerospace ==
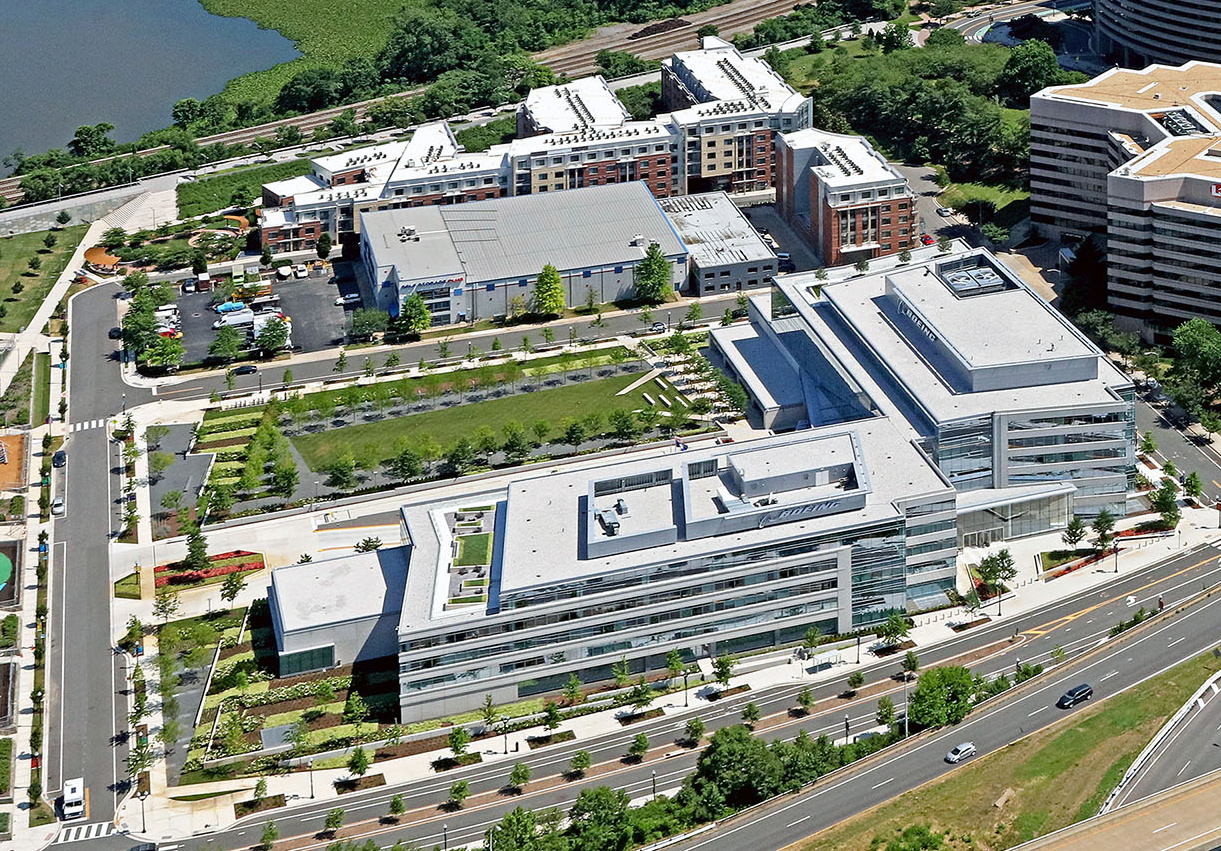
Boeing's headquarters complex in Crystal City, Virginia

The US federal government's demand for military technology has led to the growth of a large defense sector in the region. As a result, many key defense contractors are headquartered in the Washington area. The world's five largest weapons manufacturers are all headquartered in the region: Lockheed Martin is headquartered in Bethesda, Maryland; RTX Corporation is headquartered in Rosslyn, Virginia; Northrop Grumman is headquartered in West Falls Church, Virginia; Boeing, which specializes in commercial aircraft in addition to military technology, is headquartered in Crystal City; and General Dynamics is headquartered in Reston, Virginia.

Other important aviation and aerospace organizations headquartered in the broader Washington region include NASA, the US government's space research organization, which is headquartered in DC. NASA's Goddard Space Flight Center, which is one of the organization's largest research centers in the country, is located in Greenbelt, Maryland. Goddard is the largest combined organization of scientists and engineers in the United States dedicated to research on the Earth, the Solar System, and the Universe via observations from space. Additionally, Airbus, which specializes in both commercial aviation and military technology, has its North American branch, known as Airbus Group, Inc., headquartered in Fairfax County, Virginia. Blue Origin has major offices in Reston, Virginia and SpaceX has an office in DC. Ethiopian Airlines has its US headquarters in Alexandria, Virginia.

== Diplomacy and global finance ==
=== Diplomacy ===
Washington is home to 185 foreign embassies, where many diplomats and ambassadors work. Key diplomatic meetings occur at embassies, as do important cultural activities and performances. DC is consequently one of the most culturally diverse cities in the world and hosts a number of internationally themed festivals and events, many of which are done in close collaboration with foreign embassies. The Organization of American States (OAS), which is a body composed of representative countries from the Americas that coordinates diplomatic, legal, and humanitarian work across the Western Hemisphere, is headquartered at the corner of 17th street and Constitution Avenue.

=== Global finance ===
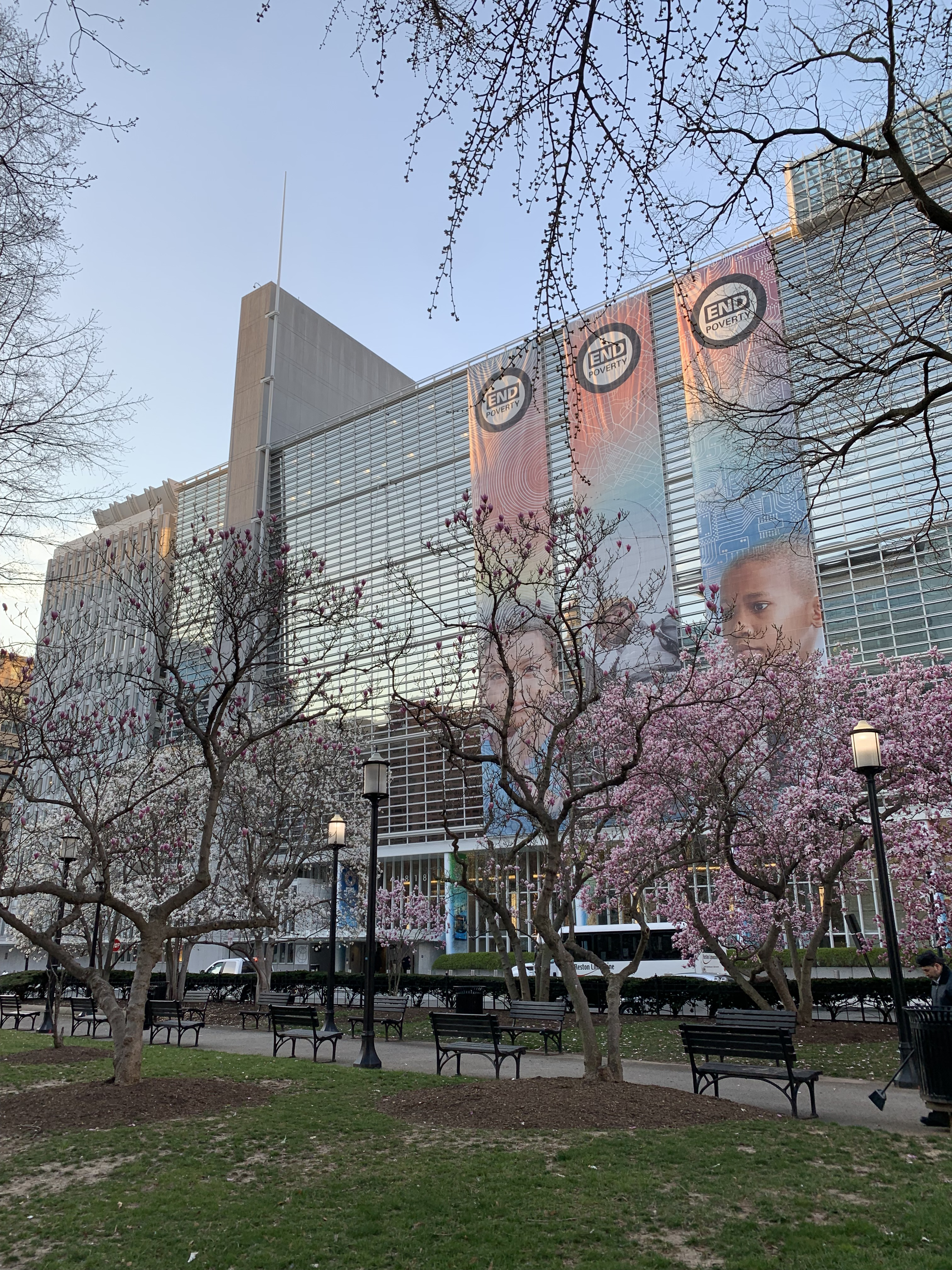
World Bank headquarters in Downtown Washington.

In addition to foreign diplomatic missions, the city holds an important role in global finance and international economics. The Federal Reserve ("The Fed"), located along Constitution Avenue, is the United States' central bank. By conducting monetary policy, the members of the Federal Reserve Board impact the value of the US dollar, key interest rates, and the value of currencies around the world.

The World Bank and International Monetary Fund (both located in the Golden Triangle) are key global financial and development institutions whose policies have a dramatic effect on the wealth and development of countries across the world. They use loans and grants to influence foreign countries' level of economic development and financial stability. Due to the heavy importance the city holds in global finance, in 2023 the Global Financial Centres Index ranked DC as the 8th most competitive financial center in the world.

=== International development ===
Key development institutions headquartered in the city include the Inter-American Development Bank and USAID, the US government agency responsible for leading the government's international development activities. The concentration of financial resources, development expertise, and organizations involved in financing global development has established the Washington region as a major center for the international development sector. The region is also home to major firms in the field, including Chemonics International.

== Research and professional services ==
Washington is a leading center for both national and international research organizations.

=== Museums and cultural history ===
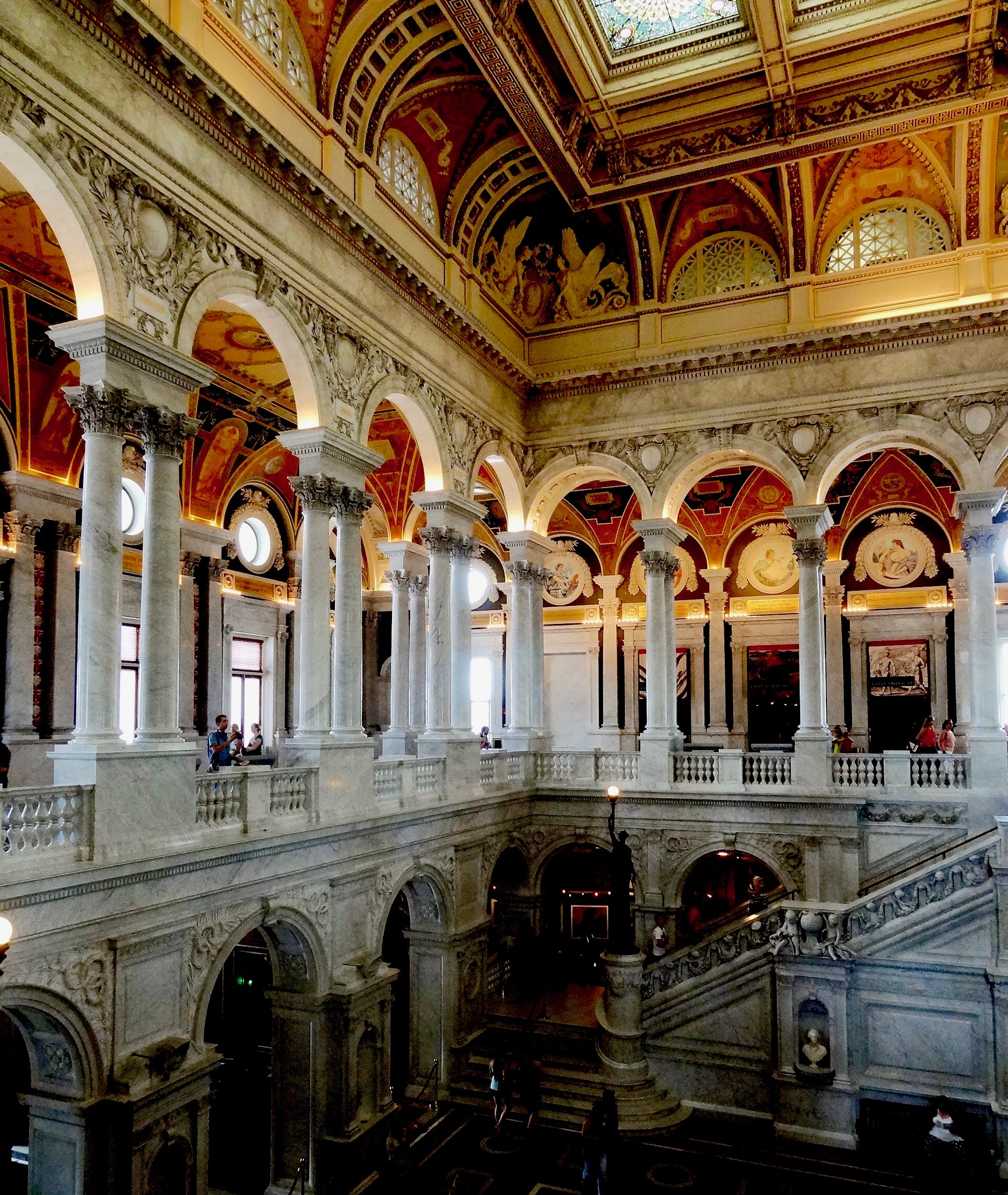
The Library of Congress, which is the national library of the United States, is the world's largest library and a major center for research.

Among the most notable research institutions in the Washington area is the Smithsonian Institution, which controls many of the region's museums while conducting advanced research on a number of subjects, including art history, natural history, zoology, and space. Three of the institution's research centers are located in the Washington region: the Archives of American Art and Smithsonian Libraries and Archives are both located in DC while the Museum Conservation Institute is in Prince George's County, Maryland.

Other organizations key to research on a number of subjects include the Library of Congress and the National Archives. The Folger Shakespeare Library, located in the Capitol Hill neighborhood, is the world's largest research library focused on Shakespeare and early English-language texts, while also being a leading classical theatre company. The Shakespeare Theatre Company and Ford's Theatre, both located in the city, are also among the country's most prominent classical theatres. Additionally, the National Endowment for the Arts, headquartered at the Constitution Center, is an independent government agency that provides support and funding for artistic functions across the United States. The Kennedy Center for the Performing Arts, located in the Foggy Bottom neighborhood, is the country's cultural center, and a leading performing arts institution.

=== Think tanks ===
The city is known for having a heavy concentration of think tanks engaged in public policy research, writing, and advocacy. As of 2020, 8% of the country's think tanks were headquartered in the city, including many of the largest and most widely cited; these include the Carnegie Endowment for International Peace, Center for Strategic and International Studies, Brookings Institution, Atlantic Council, Peterson Institute for International Economics, The Heritage Foundation, United States Institute of Peace, and Urban Institute.

=== Medical research ===
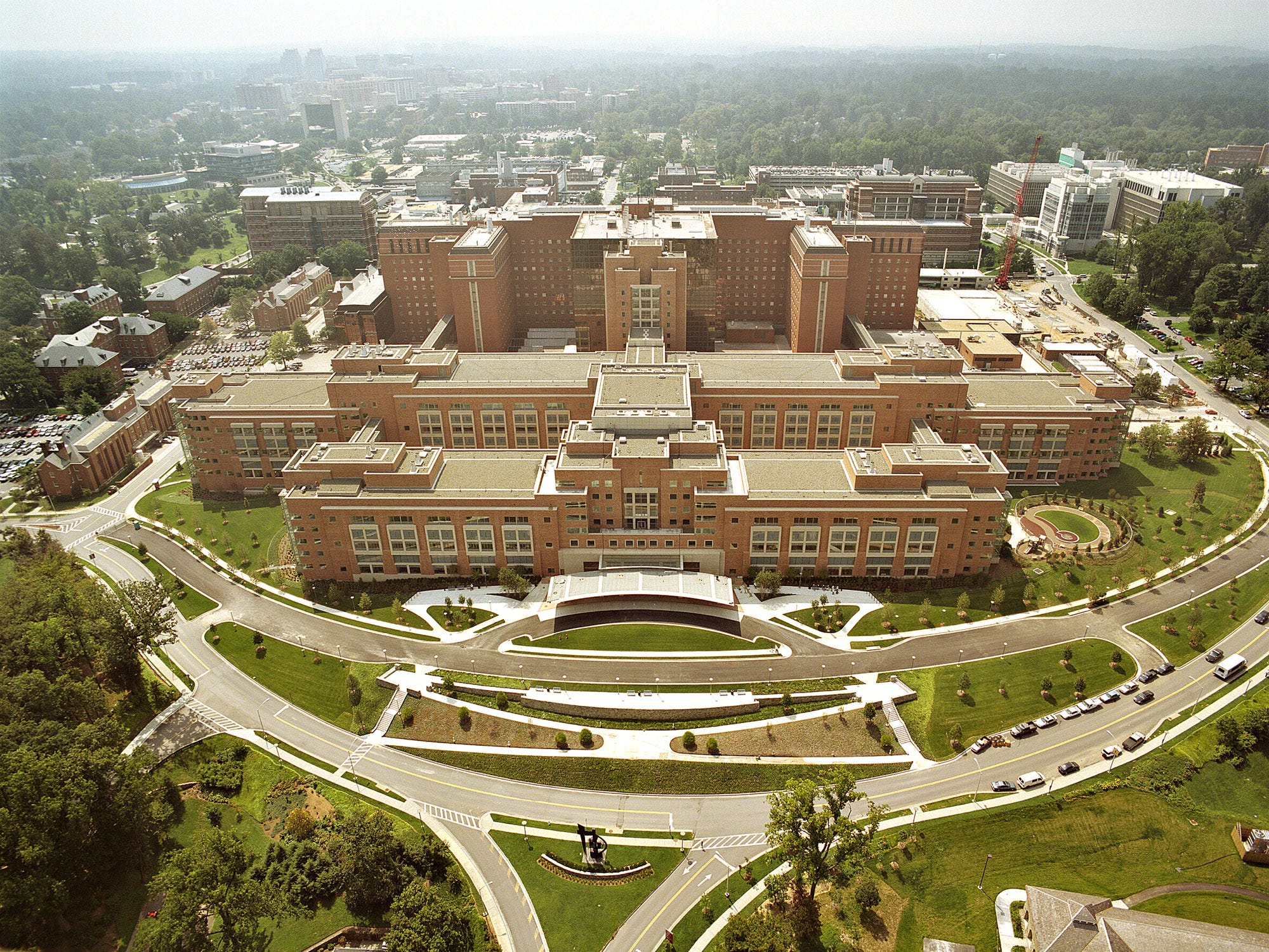
The National Institutes of Health (NIH), headquartered in Bethesda, Maryland, is one of the world's leading biomedical and health research institutions.

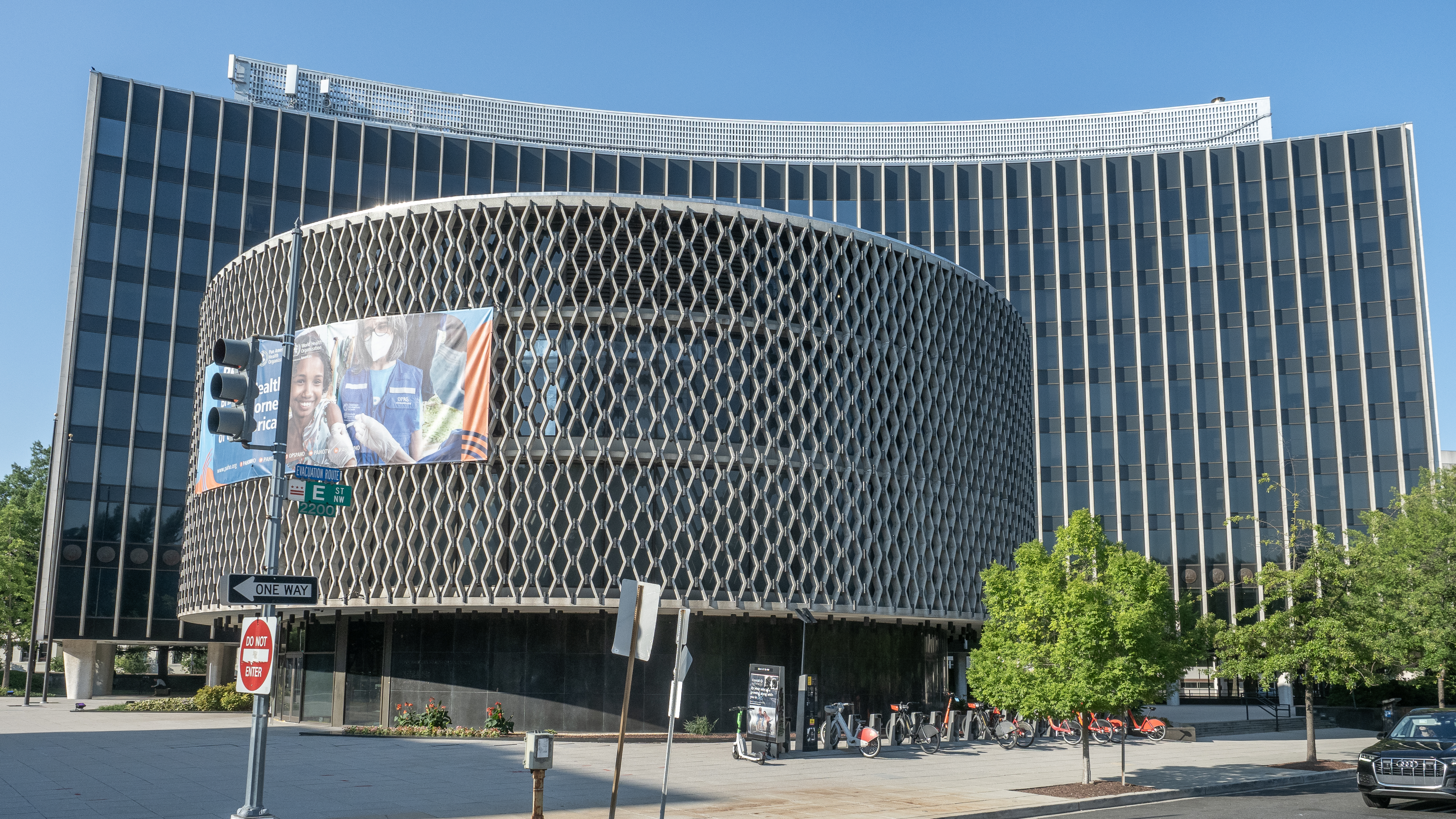
Headquarters of the Pan-American Health Organization (PAHO) in the Foggy Bottom neighborhood. PAHO serves as the World Health Organization's regional headquarters for the Americas.

The Washington metropolitan area is home to the National Institutes of Health (NIH), which is headquartered in Bethesda, Maryland. The NIH is the US federal government's primary institution conducting biomedical and health research. The NIH is composed of 27 institutes and centers conducting leading research on a wide range of issues related to health and medicine, and is one of the most widely cited scientific research institutions in the world.

Due to the proximity of medical research facilities and human capital, a part of suburban Maryland known as DNA Valley or the I-270 technology corridor is one of the country's leading biotechnology hubs, with a major focus on genetic medicine. Many private companies and public entities have research centers in the DNA Valley. As a result, the DC area is the country's second-largest hub for the life sciences industry.

Other organizations located in the region that specialize in medical research, medical care, and funding for medical institutions include the Children's National Hospital, MedStar Washington Hospital Center, the National Foundation for Cancer Research, American Institute for Cancer Research, Walter Reed National Military Medical Center, George Washington University Hospital, MedStar Georgetown University Hospital, and the Foundation for Biomedical Research. Additionally, the American College of Radiology is located in Reston, Virginia, while the affiliated American Institute for Radiologic Pathology is located in Silver Spring, Maryland.

The Pan-American Health Organization (PAHO), which is a United Nations agency that coordinates health work in the Americas, is headquartered in the Foggy Bottom neighborhood of DC. PAHO serves as the regional office for the World Health Organization in the Americas.

The Howard Hughes Medical Institute, headquartered in Chevy Chase, Maryland (just outside the DC border) with offices in Ashburn, Virginia, is one of the largest charitable organizations in the world and a leading funder for biological and medical research.

The American Institutes for Research, based in Arlington, Virginia, is one of the country's largest research non-profits, and conducts research on a number of topics, including health.

=== Professional services ===
The city is home to many for-profit professional services firms, including law firms and a number of consultancy organizations, particularly those focused on trade, as well as political, geopolitical, and economic risk. Among these are FTI Consulting, the Albright Stonebridge Group, McLarty Associates, and major offices for Eurasia Group. Hogan Lovells, the sixth largest law firm in the world, is co-headquartered in DC and London.

The Big 4 consultancy firms (Deloitte, EY, PwC, and KPMG) all have major offices spread throughout the Washington region.

== Humanitarianism ==
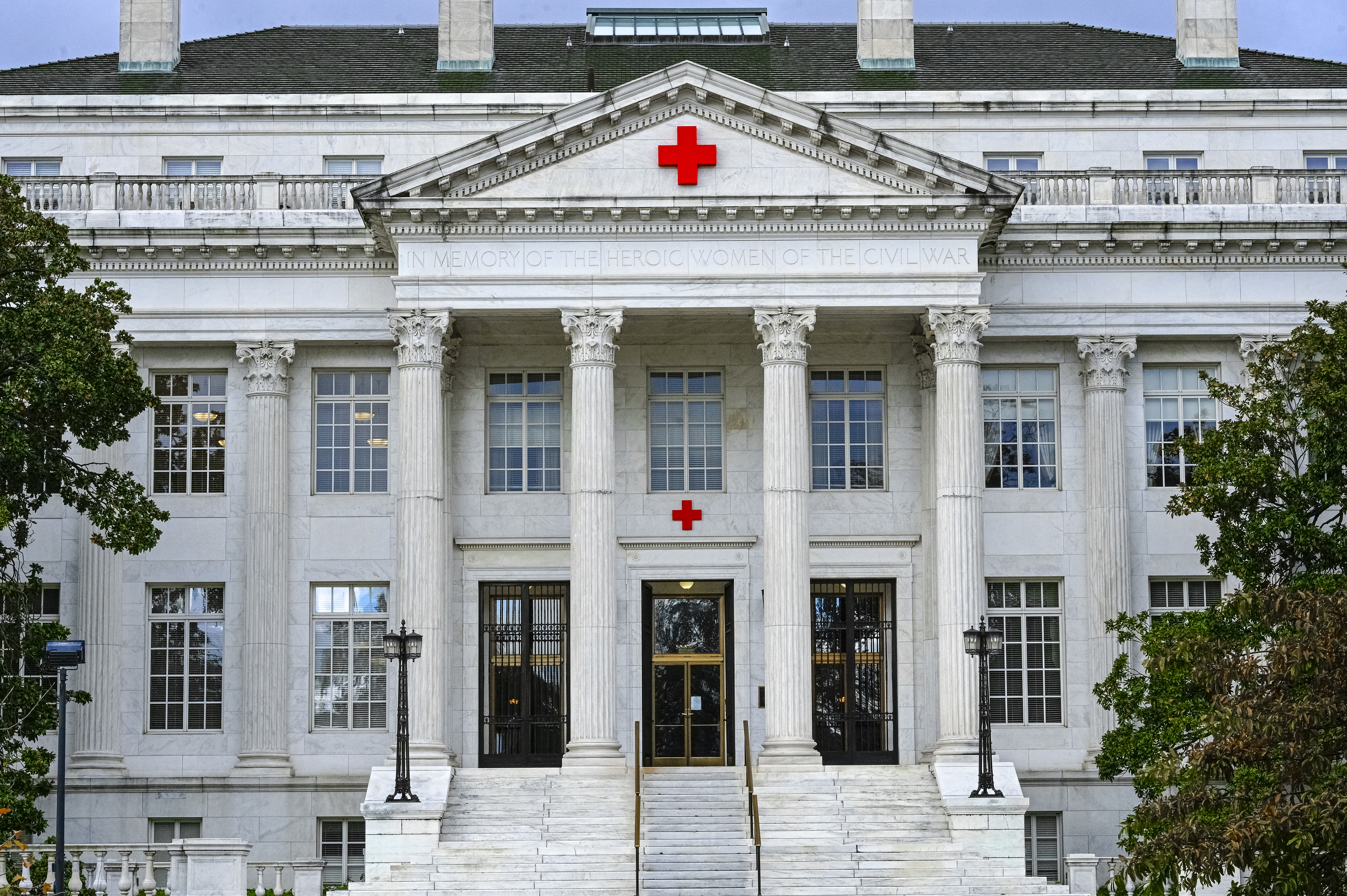
The American Red Cross is headquartered in the city.

DC is a global center for human rights and humanitarian non-profit organizations. There are over 500 humanitarian organizations located in the Greater Washington area. These organizations address both domestic and global issues by doing research, running aid programs, and conducting public advocacy.

Among these organizations include the UN Foundation, Human Rights Campaign, the World Wildlife Fund, the National Democratic Institute, Bread for the World, World Central Kitchen, Refugees International, US Committee for Refugees and Immigrants (Arlington, Virginia), and the National Endowment for Democracy. The American Red Cross, a humanitarian agency part of the global Red Cross network, is also headquartered in the city. Other key humanitarian organizations with major offices in the city include Save the Children and Search for Common Ground, among many others. The US headquarters for the Salvation Army is in Alexandria, Virginia.

== Technology and finance ==
=== Information technology ===
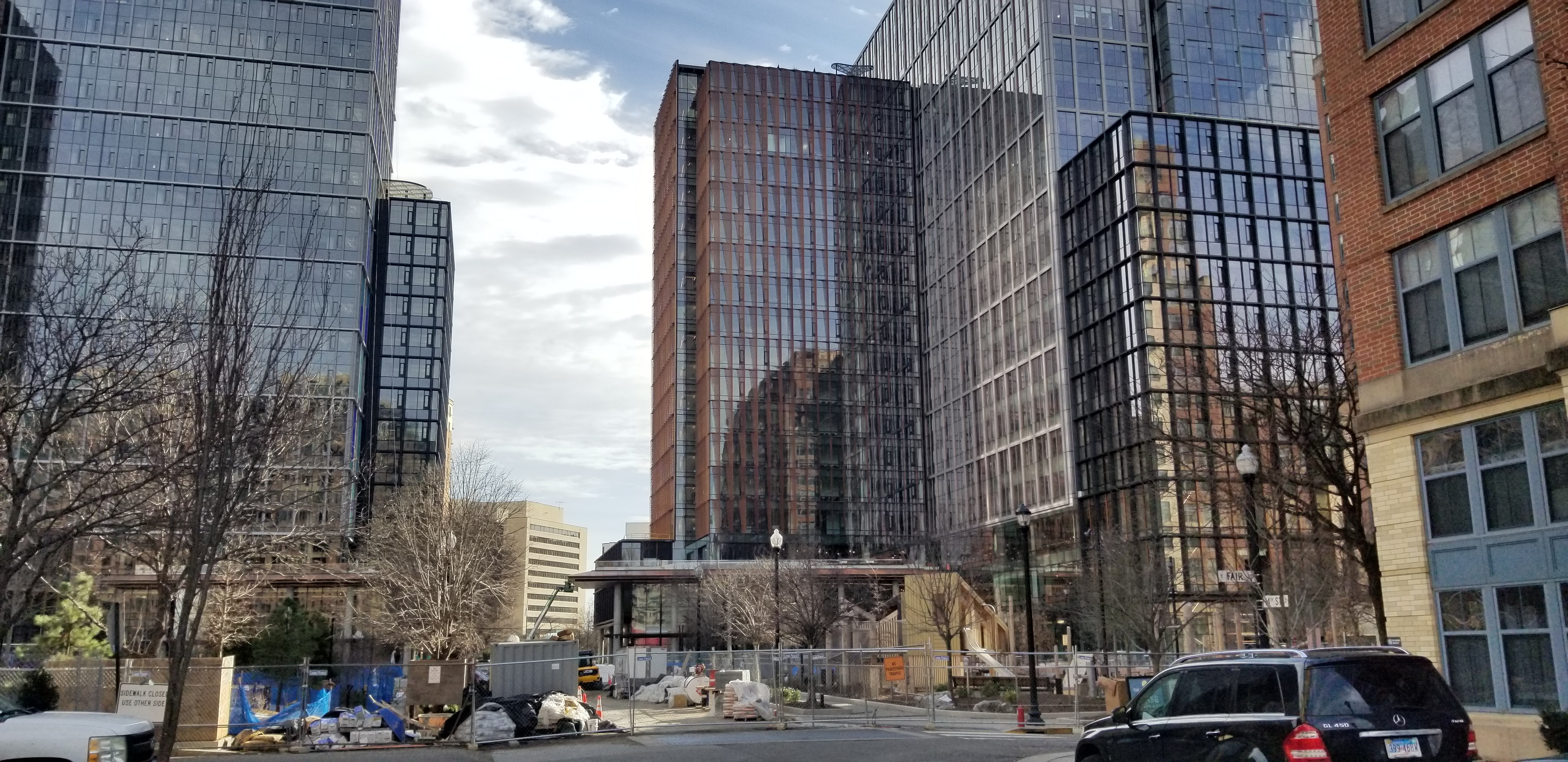
Amazon's headquarters in the National Landing area of Arlington County, Virginia.

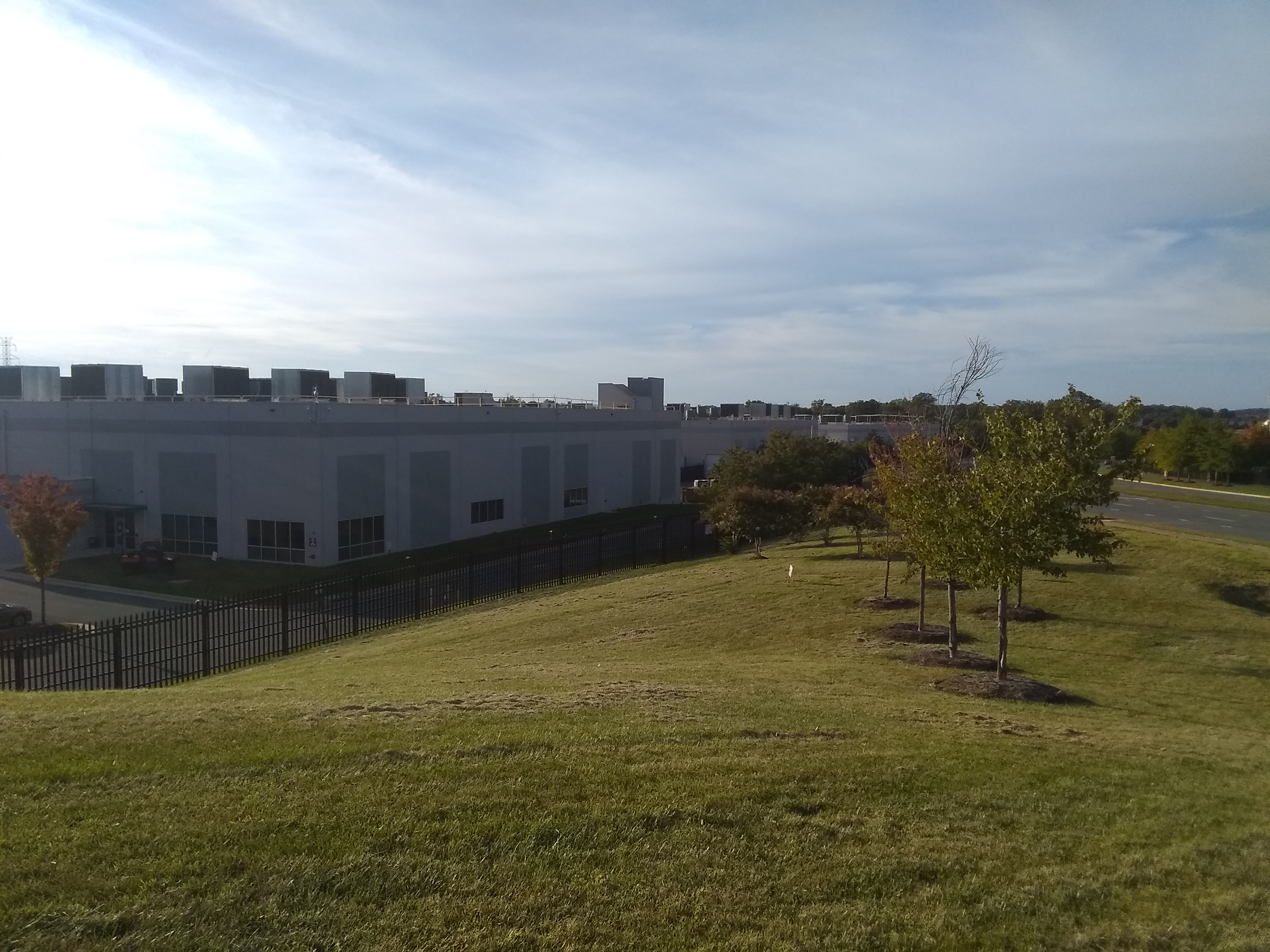
A data center for Amazon Web Services in Ashburn, Virginia. Northern Virginia has the world's largest collection of data centers.

The wider Washington region is one of the most important centers for information technology (IT) in the United States. The roots of IT in the Washington metropolitan area date back to the founding of the modern internet. America Online (AOL) was headquartered in Sterling, Virginia during its peak in the 1990s. As a result, much of the infrastructure, financial capital, and human capital needed in the IT sector remains concentrated in the region. The large size of the tech sector in the area is perhaps most evident in the fact that the Washington region, and especially Northern Virginia, houses the world's largest collection of data centers.

The Dulles Technology Corridor in Northern Virginia, which extends from Dulles International Airport on the west through Alexandria, Virginia on the east, contains a large concentration of tech company headquarters and key satellite offices. Among the companies with offices along this corridor include Google, Amazon Web Services, IBM, Blue Origin, and Leidos, which is headquartered in Reston, Virginia. SAIC is also headquartered in Reston. Additionally, Amazon's headquarters is located in the National Landing area of Arlington County, Virginia. The company chose Northern Virginia to be the location of its second headquarters (to support its original headquarters in Seattle), due in part to the proximity of tech knowledge and talent in the area. Tapping into this knowledge hub, Virginia Tech, a university whose main campus is in Blacksburg, Virginia in the southwestern part of the state, has opened a $1 billion "innovation campus" in Potomac Yard, Alexandria, where the university focuses on teaching technology classes and conducting tech research.

Verisign, headquartered in Reston, Virginia, operates a number of network infrastructure, including two of the Internet's thirteen root nameservers, the authoritative registry for the .com, .net, and .name generic top-level domains and the .cc country-code top-level domains, and the back-end systems for the .jobs and .edu sponsored top-level domains.

Many technology and finance companies are headquartered in Tysons, Virginia, a key commercial and shopping area in Fairfax County, Virginia. As the central business district of Fairfax and a growing mixed-used area, Tysons is an edge city of Washington, DC and the 12th-largest business district in the country.

Among the major companies headquartered in Tysons include Alarm.com, Appian Corporation, Booz Allen Hamilton, MITRE Corporation, M.C. Dean, Inc., Cvent, Freddie Mac, Exelis, MicroStrategy, Logistics Management Institute, Space Adventures, and Spacenet. Other firms with offices in Tysons include Adobe Systems, BAE Systems Inc., Compuware, DXC Technology, Palantir Technologies, Deloitte, Ernst & Young, Northrop Grumman, PricewaterhouseCoopers, Xerox, and Vie de France.

=== Biotechnology ===
The DC region is a major biotechnology and life sciences hub. A portion of suburban Maryland that has a heavy concentration of pharmaceutical and biotech research centers, particularly as they relate to genetic medicine, is known as DNA Valley. Among the many biotech and pharmaceutical companies with research centers or their global or regional headquarters in the area include AstraZeneca (Gaithersburg, Maryland), Emergent BioSolutions (headquartered in Gaithersburg), Merck (Rockville, Maryland), Pfizer (Washington, D.C.), GSK (Rockville), United Therapeutics (headquartered in Silver Spring, Maryland), Novavax (headquartered in Gaithersburg), and Thermo Fisher Scientific (Rockville).

=== Financial services ===
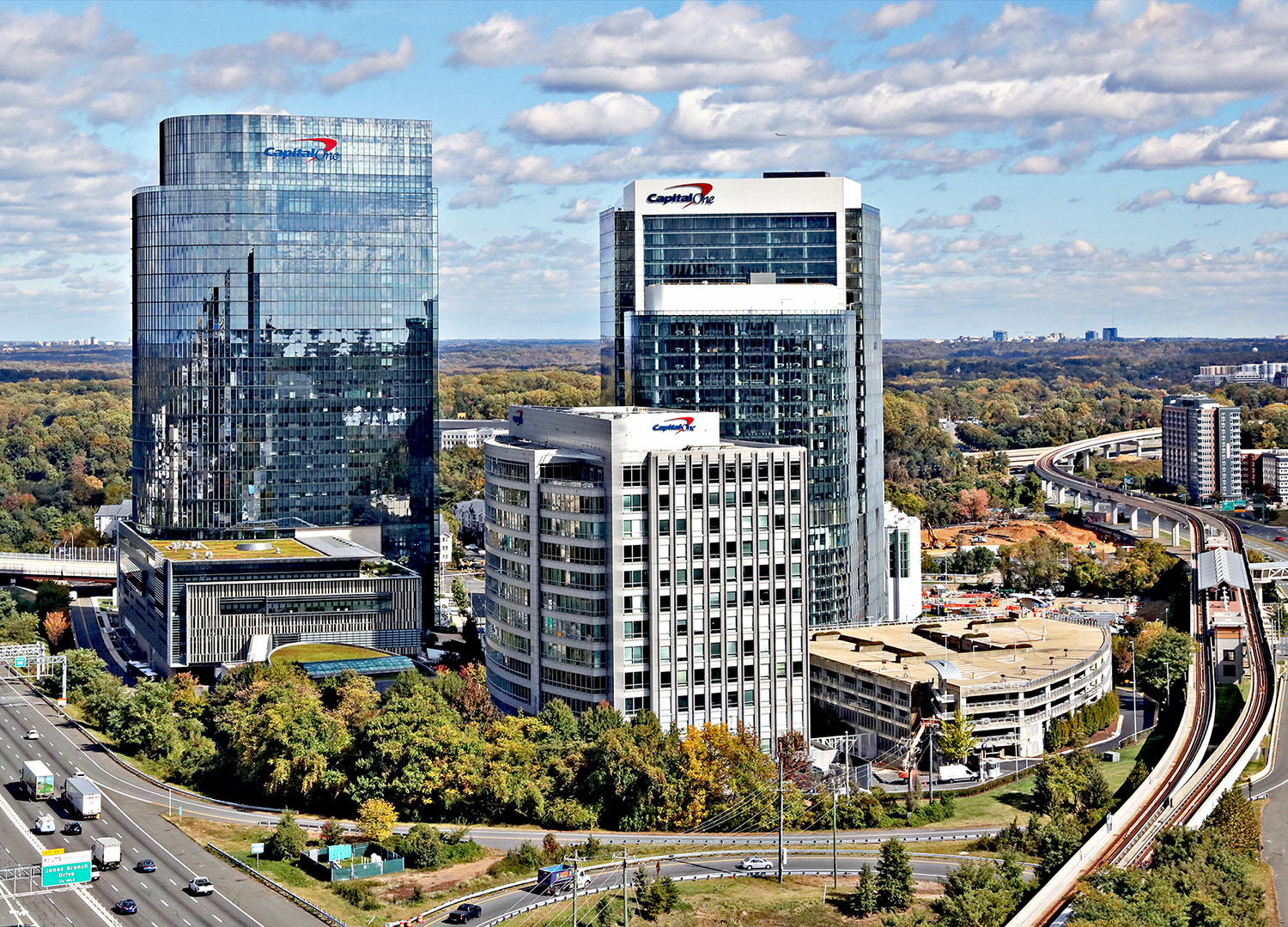
Capital One's global headquarters in Tysons, Virginia.

Capital One, a bank holding company, has its global headquarters in Tysons, Virginia. The sprawling Capital One complex has multiple office buildings as well as Capital One Hall, a performing arts venue built and run by Capital One. Other key financial players headquartered in the area include two in the mortgage-backed securities industry: Fannie Mae (headquartered in DC and with major offices in Reston, Virginia) and Freddie Mac (headquartered in Tysons).

Other important financial organizations headquartered in the Washington area include the Carlyle Group (Washington, DC), which is one of the world's largest private equity investment firms, PenFed Credit Union (Tysons), Northwest Federal Credit Union (Herndon, Virginia), and Navy Federal Credit Union (Vienna, Virginia). Geico, a car insurance company, is headquartered in Chevy Chase, Maryland, just north of the Maryland-DC border.

The Danaher Corporation, headquartered in Washington, is a major conglomerate that invests in many different industries, such as life sciences, diagnostics, and environmental sectors. Founded by Steven and Mitchell Rales, the company has grown to be one of the most significant conglomerates in the country.

== Hospitality ==
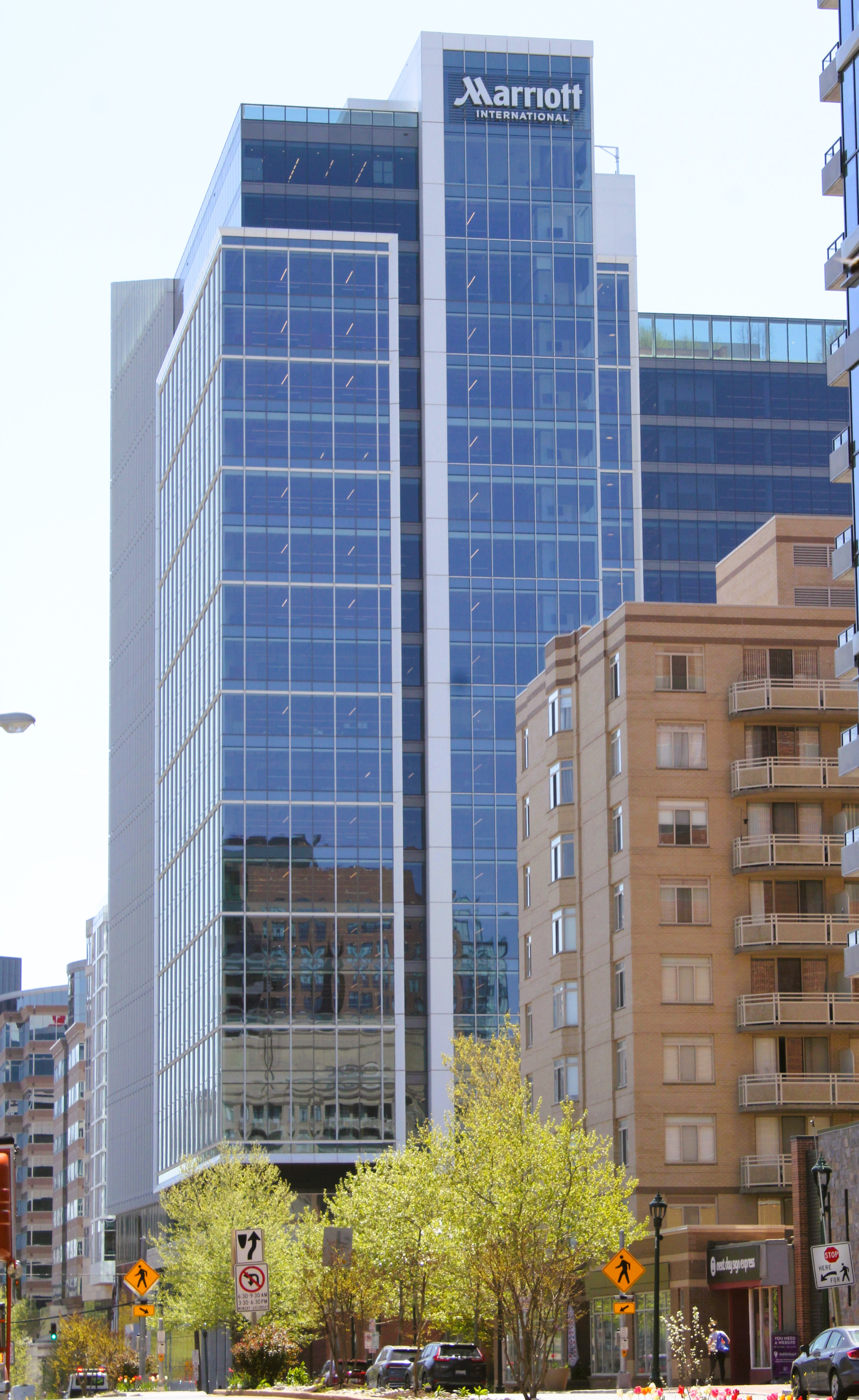
Marriott International, the world's largest hotel chain, has its global headquarters in Bethesda, Maryland.

The DC region serves as the headquarters for key hotel and hospitality companies. Several of the world's largest hotel chains are headquartered in the DC area. Marriott International, the largest hotel chain in the world, was founded as a root beer stand in Washington, D.C. in 1927 and is now headquartered in Bethesda, Maryland. Host Hotels & Resorts, Inc., which is an American real estate investment trust that invests in hotels, is also headquartered in Bethesda. Choice Hotels, a global hotel chain, has its headquarters in North Bethesda, Maryland. Hilton Worldwide, the world's second-largest hotel chain, is headquartered in Tysons, Virginia.

The Washington area has a large concentration of hotels, making it an economically important region for the hospitality industry. Historic hotels located in the city include Georgetown Inn, Hamilton Hotel, Omni Shoreham Hotel, Riggs Hotel, Mayflower Hotel, and the Willard Hotel.

== Consumer goods ==
A number of companies producing popular consumer goods are headquartered throughout the Washington region. Mars Inc., a manufacturer of sugary treats as well as pet food, is headquartered in Tysons, Virginia. Mars is the maker of popular treats, such as M&M's, Snickers, and Twix. Nestlé, which manufactures a number of different foods and drinks, has its US headquarters at 1812 North Moore Street in Rosslyn, Virginia. Lidl, a discount grocery chain based in Germany, has its US headquarters in Crystal City, Virginia.

Numerous major fast casual restaurant chains were founded and remain headquartered in the area. CAVA was founded in Rockville, Maryland and is headquartered in DC; Five Guys was founded in Arlington, Virginia and is headquartered in Alexandria, Virginia. Sweetgreen was founded in DC.

Volkswagen, a car design and manufacturing company, has its North America headquarters in Reston, Virginia. The luxury car brand Rolls-Royce's North American branch, known as Rolls-Royce North America, is also headquartered in Reston.

Bechtel, the country's second-largest engineering and construction company and one of the largest private companies in the country, is headquartered in Reston.

CoStar Group, which provides information, analytics, and marketing services to commercial property companies in North America, is headquartered in Rosslyn, Virginia. CoStar is the parent company of Homes.com and Apartments.com.

== Tourism ==
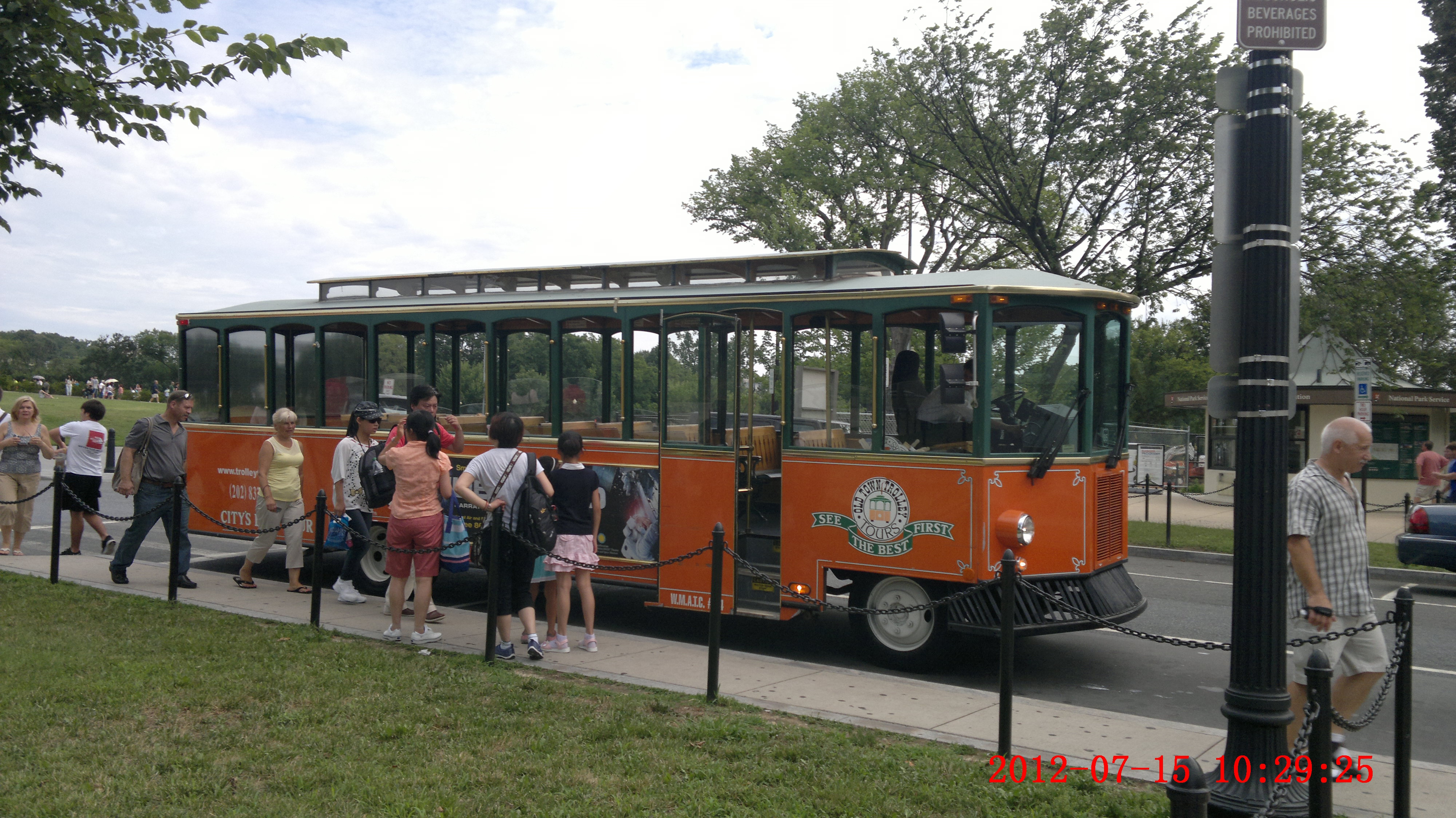
Tourists getting on a tour bus along the National Mall

Tourism is among the DC region's largest and most important industries. In 2019, the city attracted 24.6 million tourists, including 1.8 million from foreign countries. Collectively, tourists spent $8.15 billion during their stay.

The city and wider Washington region has a diverse array of attractions for tourists. Among these are monuments, memorials, museums, sports events, and national parks. Within the city, the National Mall serves as the center of the tourism industry and the location of many of the city's museums and monuments. Just south of the Mall sits the Tidal Basin, where several additional memorials and monuments lie, including the popular Jefferson Memorial.

Arlington National Cemetery in Arlington County, Virginia is among the region's most visited tourist sites. This is a military cemetery that serves as a burial ground for former military combatants. It is also the location of President John F. Kennedy's tomb, marked by an eternal flame. President William Howard Taft is also buried in Arlington. The Tomb of the Unknown Soldier is located in the cemetery and is guarded 24/7 by a tomb guard. The changing of the guard is a popular tourist attraction and occurs once every hour from October through March and every half-hour during the rest of the year. Other key tourist attractions in the area include the Washington National Cathedral, The Pentagon, the 9/11 Pentagon Memorial, the United States Air Force Memorial, Old Town Alexandria, National Harbor, and Mount Vernon, the former home of George Washington.

== Media ==
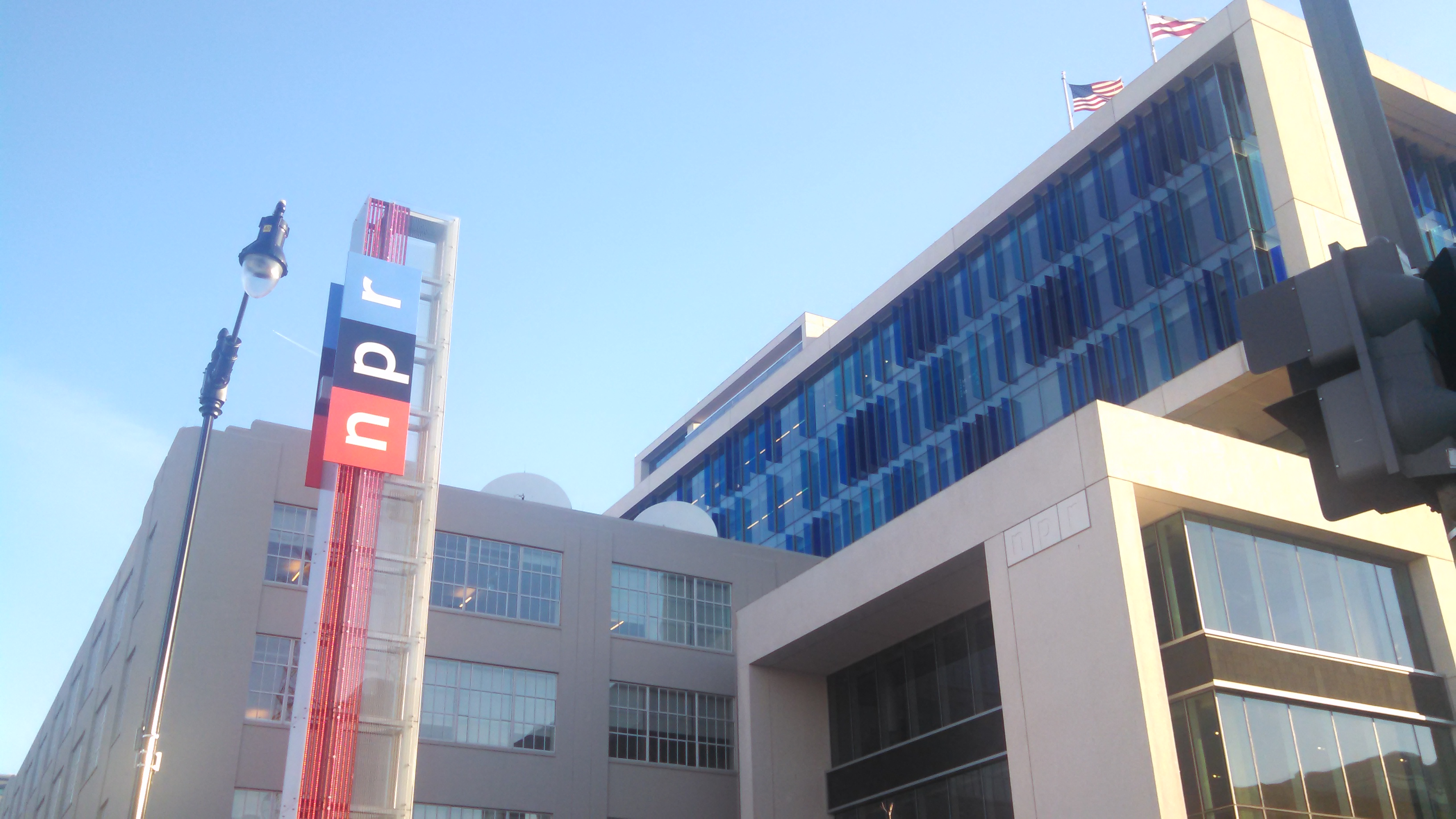
National Public Radio (NPR) is headquartered in the NoMa neighborhood of D.C.

Washington, D.C., is a global center for media. The Washington Post, founded in 1877, is one of the nation's most widely circulating newspapers. It is headquartered at One Franklin Square in Downtown Washington.

The Washington Times is a newspaper covering Washington politics from a conservative perspective.

The Atlantic magazine, which has covered politics, international affairs, and cultural issues since 1857, is headquartered at an office building located on the Wharf.

Other key media sources include the weekly Washington Blade and Metro Weekly, which focus on LGBT issues; the Washington Informer and The Washington Afro American, which highlight topics of interest to the black community; and The Current Newspapers. Congressional Quarterly, The Hill, Politico, and Roll Call are newspapers and online media that mostly report on Congress and the federal government. Other globally circulating publications based in Washington include the National Geographic magazine, the Smithsonian magazine, and political publications such as The Washington Examiner, The New Republic, and Washington Monthly. U.S. News & World Report is headquartered in Washington.

USA Today, which covers both politics and popular culture, is headquartered in Tysons, Virginia.

Several media companies and cable television channels have their headquarters in the area, including C-SPAN, Radio One, the National Geographic Channel, Smithsonian Networks, National Public Radio (NPR), and PBS (in Arlington County, Virginia). The Travel Channel (in Chevy Chase, Maryland) and Discovery Communications (in Silver Spring, Maryland) have offices in the area. The headquarters of Voice of America, the U.S. government's international news service, is near the Capitol in Southwest Washington, D.C.
