= NFCU =

NFCU may refer to:

- Navy Federal Credit Union, a credit union based in Virginia
- Nevada Federal Credit Union, a credit union based in Nevada
- Northwest Federal Credit Union, a credit union based in Virginia
