= One Nevada Credit Union =

Financial institution in the United States

- Type: Credit union
- Industry: Financial services
- Founded: 1950
- Headquarters: Winchester, Nevada, United States
- Key people: Steve O’Donnell, President/CEO; Mark Ferrario, Chairman; Michael Lantz, Vice Chairman
- Products: Savings; checking; consumer loans; mortgages; credit cards
- Total assets: $1.5B USD (As of July 31, 2026)
- Number of employees: 182
- Website: onenevada.org

One Nevada Credit Union, headquartered in Winchester, Nevada, is the largest locally based federally insured, state-chartered credit union in Nevada with locations in Las Vegas, Henderson, Reno, and North Las Vegas.

== Membership ==
One Nevada has a community charter, meaning membership is available to anyone who lives, works (or regularly conducts business in), worships, attends school, or volunteers in Clark County, Washoe County, Nye County, along with members of the immediate family or household of an existing member or those eligible for membership.

== Financial performance ==
As of July 31, 2026, One Nevada had 13 branch locations, 400 surcharge-free ATMs in Nevada alone and 43,000 ATMs nationwide as part of the Allpoint Network, 74,538 members, and $1.5 billion in total assets. It is classified as a well-capitalized credit union by the National Credit Union Administration and its deposits are insured for up to $250,000 through the National Credit Union Share Insurance Fund. One Nevada remains one of the strongest credit unions or banks in the state with more than 16.2% in capital reserves.

== History ==
One Nevada has its beginnings in two separate credit unions that merged many years later. The Vegas Air Base Federal Credit Union was started on February 10, 1950, when nine civilian employees pooled $5 each to begin their credit union. The credit union changed its name to Nellis Federal Credit Union in 1958.

Meanwhile, at Las Vegas City Hall, seven City employees began the Las Vegas City Employees Federal Credit Union on February 14, 1951. For the next 30 years or so, both credit unions served the employees of their respective employers and their families. Both credit unions grew and expanded their services.

On August 31, 1983, the Nellis Southern Nevada Federal Credit Union and the Las Vegas Federal Credit Union merged and adopted the name Nevada Federal Credit Union.

During the 1980s, several smaller credit unions joined with Nevada Federal. Those smaller credit unions include the Showboat Credit Union, the Commercial Center Credit Union, the Nevada Air Guard Credit Union, the Washoe State Employees Federal Credit Union, the North Las Vegas City Employees Federal Credit Union, the Vegas Village Credit Union, the Tropicana Employees Federal Credit Union and others.

In August 2011, the members of Nevada Federal Credit Union approved the conversion from a federal charter to a Nevada state-charter. The credit union changed its name to One Nevada Credit Union shortly thereafter.

== Timeline ==
1950s	• 1950 – Vegas Air Base Federal Credit Union was started • 1950 – Vegas Air Base Federal Credit Union reaches 77 members with $1,807 in assets • 1951 – Las Vegas City Employees Federal Credit Union was started • 1951 – Las Vegas City Employees Federal Credit Union reached 66 members with $2,205 in assets • 1958 – Vegas Air Base Federal Credit Union changed its name to Nellis Federal Credit Union	Las Vegas City Employees Federal Credit Union One of the First ATMs
1980s	• 1981 – Nellis Federal became Nellis Southern Nevada and Las Vegas City Employees became Las Vegas Federal Credit Union • 1983 – Nellis Southern Nevada Federal Credit Union and the Las Vegas Federal Credit Union merged and adopted the name Nevada Federal Credit Union • 1983 – NFCU reaches 57,000 members with $106 million in assets	Nellis-SoNev Federal Credit Union One of the First Teller Lines
2000s	• 2000 – NFCU reaches 79,000 members with $511 million in assets • 2001 – Authorized by the Federal government to serve all residents of Clark County, Nevada • 2002 – Authorized to serve all residents of Pahrump and a large portion of Reno • 2002 – Ranked #1 in the best places to work by the Southern Nevada Human Resources Association • 2003 – Ranked #1 in the best places to work by the Southern Nevada Human Resources Association • 2004 – Ranked #1 in the best places to work by the Southern Nevada Human Resources Association • 2006 – Voted Nevada State Psychologically Healthy Workplace Award for top mid-size, non-profit company • 2006 – Ranked #1 in the best places to work by the Southern Nevada Human Resources Association • 2006 – Voted Company of the Year by the Moms in Business Network and the International Association of Working Mothers • 2007 – Voted Diversity Champion by the Southern Nevada Hispanic Employment Program • 2007 – Ranked #1 in the best places to work by the Southern Nevada Human Resources Association • 2008 – AARP Best Employers for Workers Over 50 • 2008 – Ranked #1 in the best places to work by the Southern Nevada Human Resources Association • 2009 – Best Place to Work by the Society for Human Resource Management ranking No. 21 • 2009 – Ranked #1 in the best places to work by the Southern Nevada Human Resources Association • 2009 – Training Magazine's "Training Top 125" • 2009 – AARP Best Employers for Workers Over 50	Nevada Federal Credit Union Nevada Federal Credit Union Lake Mead Branch
2010s	• 2011 – Authorized by the Federal government to serve all residents of Clark County, Nevada • 2010 – Training Magazine's "Training Top 125" • 2010 – AARP Best Employers for Workers Over 50 • 2011 – Nevada Federal Credit Union converted to a state charter • 2011 – Nevada Federal Credit Union changed its name to One Nevada Credit Union • 2011 – Membership is now open to Clark County, Nellis Air Force Base, Washoe County and Nye County, Nevada • 2011 – AARP Best Employers for Workers Over 50 • 2011 – Training Magazine's "Training Top 125" for the third straight year, ranking No. 108 • 2013 – Ranked #1 in the best places to work by the Southern Nevada Human Resources Association • 2013 – Ranked #3 on the Las Vegas Review Journal's Top Workplaces • 2013 – AARP Best Employers for Workers Over 50 • 2014 – Ranked #2 on the Las Vegas Review Journal's Top Workplaces • 2014 – Selected as one of the “Best Companies to Work For” by Nevada Business Magazine • 2014 – Ranked #1 Bank/Credit Union by RJ readers in Las Vegas Review Journal's Best of Las Vegas • 2015 – ONCU reaches 76,078 members with $826.61 million in total assets • 2015 – Ranked #1 Bank/Credit Union by RJ readers in Las Vegas Review Journal's Best of Las Vegas • 2015 – Training Magazine's "Training Top 125" for the third straight year, ranking No. 59 • 2015 – Credit Union Journal and Best Companies Group "Best Credit Unions to Work For", ranking No. 1 • 2015 – Ranked #1 in the best places to work by the Southern Nevada Human Resources Association • 2016 - Won three awards in Reno News & Review's Best of Northern Nevada 2016; Best Business Facebook Page, Best Kept Secret, Best Credit Union - 3rd Place. • 2016 - Selected as winner of the 2016 Golden Pinecone Award for achievements toward improving and sustaining the environment • 2016 - Ranked #2 in Vegas Inc. Magazine's The List of best credit unions. • 2016 - Ranked #1 Bank/Credit Union by RJ readers in Las Vegas Review Journal's Best of Las Vegas. [ • 2017 – Training Magazine's "Training Top 125", ranking No. 58 • 2017 - Ranked #1 Bank/Credit Union by RJ readers in Las Vegas Review Journal's Best of Las Vegas. [ • 2018 – Training Magazine's "Training Top 125", ranking No. 52	One Nevada Credit Union One Nevada Corporate One Nevada Damonte Branch

== Products and services ==
In addition to traditional banking products and services such as share savings, share certificates, share drafts (checking), mortgage loans, auto loans, and credit cards, the credit union offers various non-traditional products. These include first-time home buyer program and Essential Checking accounts for member-households who earn less than $35,000 annually or have recently had a job loss. As of March 2010, the credit union had also launched a suite of prepaid debit card products.

One Nevada Credit Union is consistently among the largest mortgage lenders in Clark County, Nevada. The credit union recently participated in Nevada's Hardest Hit Fund and the HARP 2.0 mortgage assistance programs.

== Not-for-profit structure ==
One Nevada, like many U.S. credit unions, is locally controlled by a volunteer Board of Directors who represent the members interests. Unlike a traditional bank owned by public stockholders, a member election for the Board of Directors is held once a year. Any member in good standing can petition to run for the Board of Directors. Board volunteers are not paid for their time or service. The Board also appoints a volunteer Supervisory Committee. The Credit Union's income, aside from operating expenses and funding capitalization, are returned to the members in the form of lower loan rates, expanded services and normally, higher dividends on deposit accounts. Therefore, the credit union, like all others in the U.S., maintains a federal tax-exempt status because of the cooperative, not-for-profit organizational structure.
