= Georgetown Inn =

The Georgetown Inn
- Location within the District of Columbia

General information
- Location: 1310 Wisconsin Avenue, Georgetown, Washington, D.C.
- Coordinates: 38.907222°N 77.063452°W

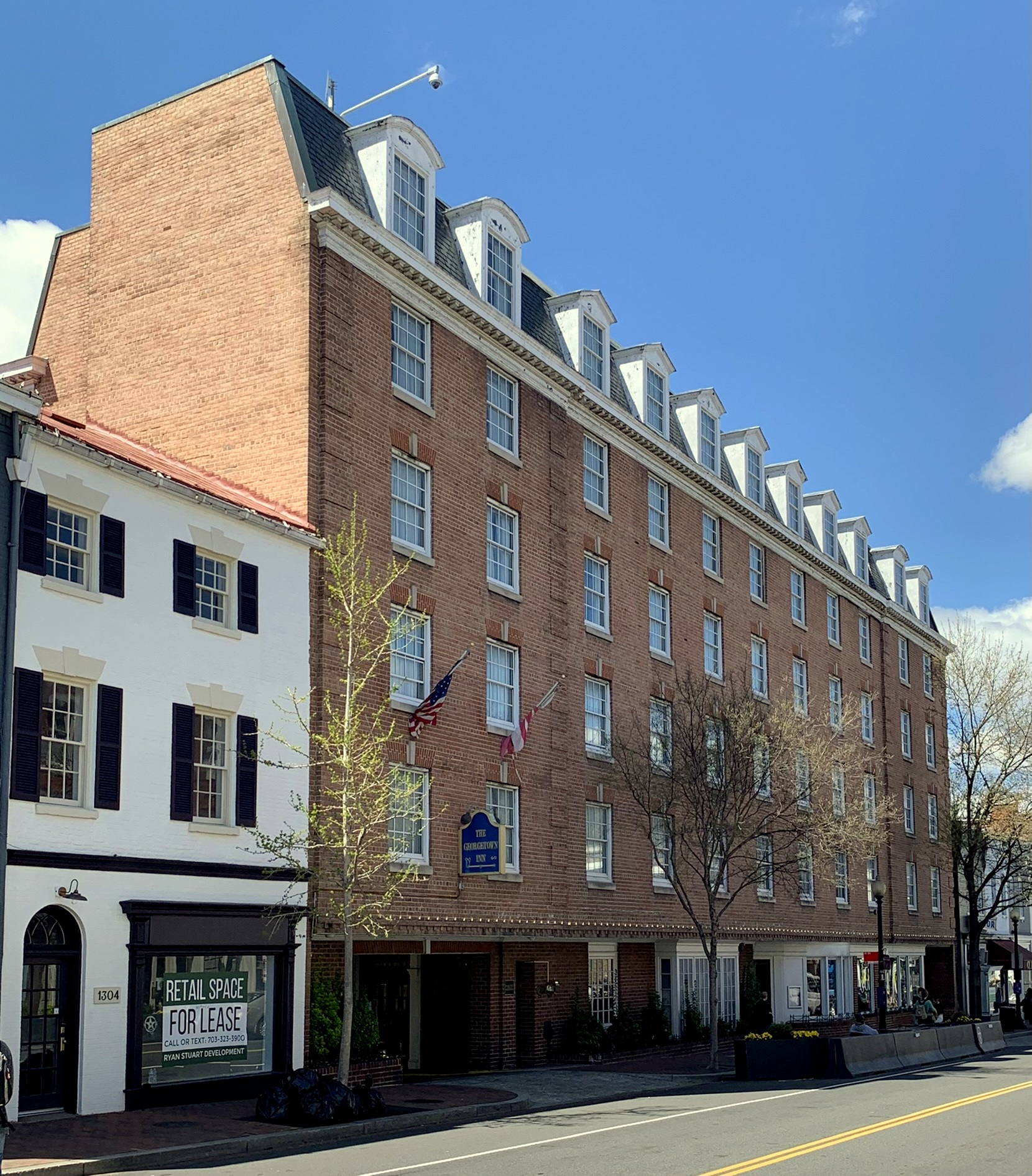
The Georgetown Inn is located at 1310 Wisconsin Avenue NW in the Georgetown neighborhood of Washington, D.C.

The Georgetown Inn, in Georgetown neighborhood of Washington, D.C., is a hotel built in 1962.

When it opened in 1962 it was the first new hotel in Georgetown in more than 100 years, and, at $22.00 per room per night, it was its most expensive.

It is a member of the Historic Hotels of America, a program of the National Trust for Historic Preservation.

The hotel was built for Sheldon Magazine, who was president of American Mortgage Investment Company, and was opened in 1962. At the opening, the general manager was Collins Bird, who, with partners, later purchased the hotel, in 1968.

The 100-room hotel was sold for $34.6 million in 2011. The new owners planned a significant renovation.

It was said in The Georgetowner in 2012 that "The hotel offered unique luxury for its day. A Washington Dossier magazine article acclaimed, 'After Blair House, the Georgetown Inn on Wisconsin Avenue is probably D.C.’s spiffiest place to go for bed and board.' The hotel was later lauded by Fortune magazine as 'A Way to Escape the Washington Stockade.'"

The hotel was briefly closed due to a fire on New Years Day 2022.
