= DNA Valley =

Regional economic development and geographic location

DNA Valley (or DNA Alley) is a region in Maryland that serves as a biotechnology hub with a focus on genetic medicine. The corridor runs through parts of the Washington metropolitan area and Baltimore metropolitan area. Roughly traced by Rockville, Frederick, and Baltimore, DNA Valley includes the innovation companies in the Maryland I-270 technology corridor, the various campuses of federal entities such as the FDA and NIH, as well as The University of Maryland, Johns Hopkins University, The Institute for Human Virology, and various laboratories with high biosafety levels such as Fort Detrick. Major DNA valley cities include: Baltimore, Columbia, Germantown, Silver Spring, Rockville, Bethesda, Gaithersburg, College Park, and Frederick. The counties that make up DNA valley are Montgomery County, Frederick County, Howard County, Baltimore County, Anne Arundel County, and Carroll County. According to the Bureau of Economic Analysis, these counties contributed a combined GDP of $310,407,270 in 2021, higher than several nations. Local business leaders like Jeff Galvin expect this figure to increase in step with the growth of the biotechnology sector.

DNA Valley is home to many of Maryland's biotechnology, pharmaceutical, and life science companies including AstraZeneca, BioNTech, GeneDx, Qiagen, American Gene Technologies, and GlaxoSmithKline. A defining feature of the region is its staggering concentration of scientists and doctors. According to New Scientist, "There are more MDs and PhDs per capita in a 10-mile radius of DC than anywhere else in the country".

== Etymology ==
The name "DNA Valley" is championed by American Gene TechnologiesⓇ CEO, Jeff Galvin. Galvin came to Maryland and the life science industry after a successful career in Silicon Valley and immediately saw the similarities between the early days of the tech industry in Silicon Valley and the life science industry in Maryland. The earliest documented use of the name came from an article written by Alison George at New Scientist in 2004, as she recounted a cab ride where her driver referred to the D.C. area as "DNA Valley" because of the concentration of biotech companies in the area.

DNA valley is not an actual geographical valley and is instead named as such because of the similarities between the biotechnology and life science boom in Maryland and the tech boom that occurred in Silicon Valley in the 1970s and 1980s. Previous to the growth of the biotechnology industry, Maryland and the surrounding regions were predominantly focused on the seafood, agriculture, and logistics industries due to the abundant waterways available in the state.

== History ==
=== Role of the NIH ===
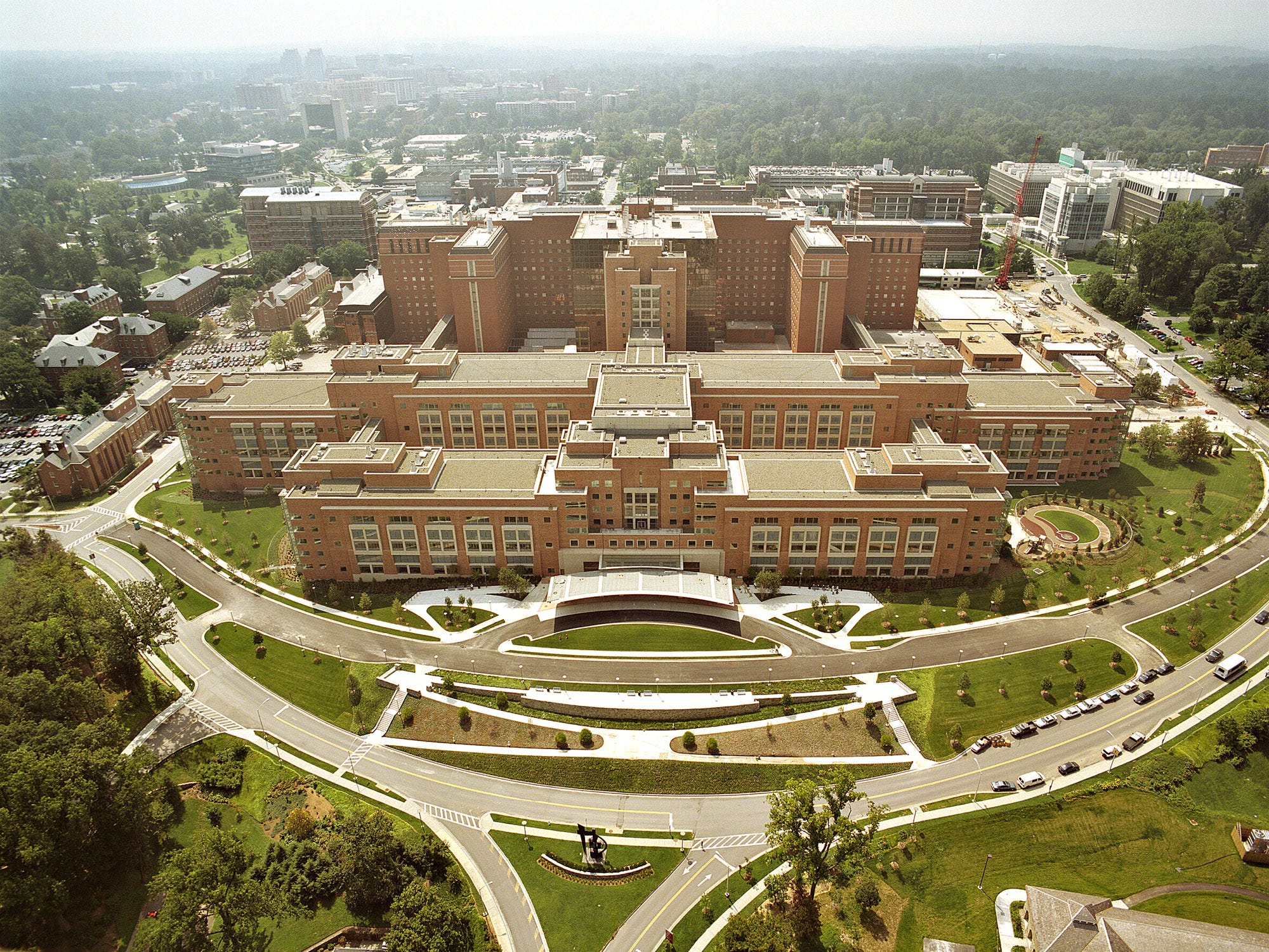
The National Institute of Health (NIH) played a central role in the emergence of DNA Valley, through its role in the Human Genome project, its central location in Bethesda, Maryland, and its investment into life sciences in the local area.

The National Institutes of Health (NIH) have played a major role in the development of the life science industry boom in Maryland, and thus the creation of DNA Valley. The NIH originally moved its headquarters from the Old Naval Observatory to Bethesda, Maryland in 1938. In 1989, as part of the launch of the Human Genome Project, the National Center for Human Genome Research (now known as The National Human Genome Research Institute) was founded in Bethesda. This made Bethesda the national hub for genetic research as genetic researchers from around the country came to help sequence the human genome. This project, being one of the most influential scientific projects of the last century, planted the seeds for the eventual biotechnology hub that has formed in the area since. The infrastructure and attention to the industry that the NCHGR and the HGP brought to Maryland are what opened the door to the extensive cell and gene therapy industries that Maryland and DNA Valley are now home to.

The NHGRI is not the only NIH subsidiary that has led to DNA Valley becoming such a major life science hub. The NIH as a whole has fueled the biotech industry in Maryland as the research done at the federally funded facilities has resulted in new fields of research, new tools, and highly trained researchers that often remain in the area and create their own life science companies. For example, the work done by Roscoe Brady, MD, PhD on viral vectors caught the attention of entrepreneur Jeff Galvin, inspiring him to found American Gene Technologies and pursue potential cures for diseases like HIV, PKU, and certain cancers.. The NIH also funds outside research in the area, which further allows for the industry to flourish as more companies want to be based near the NIH headquarters in Bethesda.

A variety of life science-related conferences are held annually at the NIH headquarters in Bethesda, such as workshops, trainings, and professional conferences, all of which not only bring attention and prestige to the life science industry in Maryland, but also result in a better trained and educated population in the area, allowing for the further success of the industry.

The NIH is not exclusively located in Bethesda and has a variety of campuses in Maryland. The Bayview Campus in Baltimore contains the research programs of the National Institute of Aging and the National Institute of Drug Abuse. The Frederick National Laboratory and Riverside Research Park are home to the National Cancer Institute, which includes the Center for Cancer Research. The widespread footprint of the NIH in Maryland directly correlates to the biotech boom that resulted in DNA Valley, as the highest concentrations of life science companies are located in the same locations of Rockville, Frederick, and Baltimore.

=== Rise of genetic medicine ===
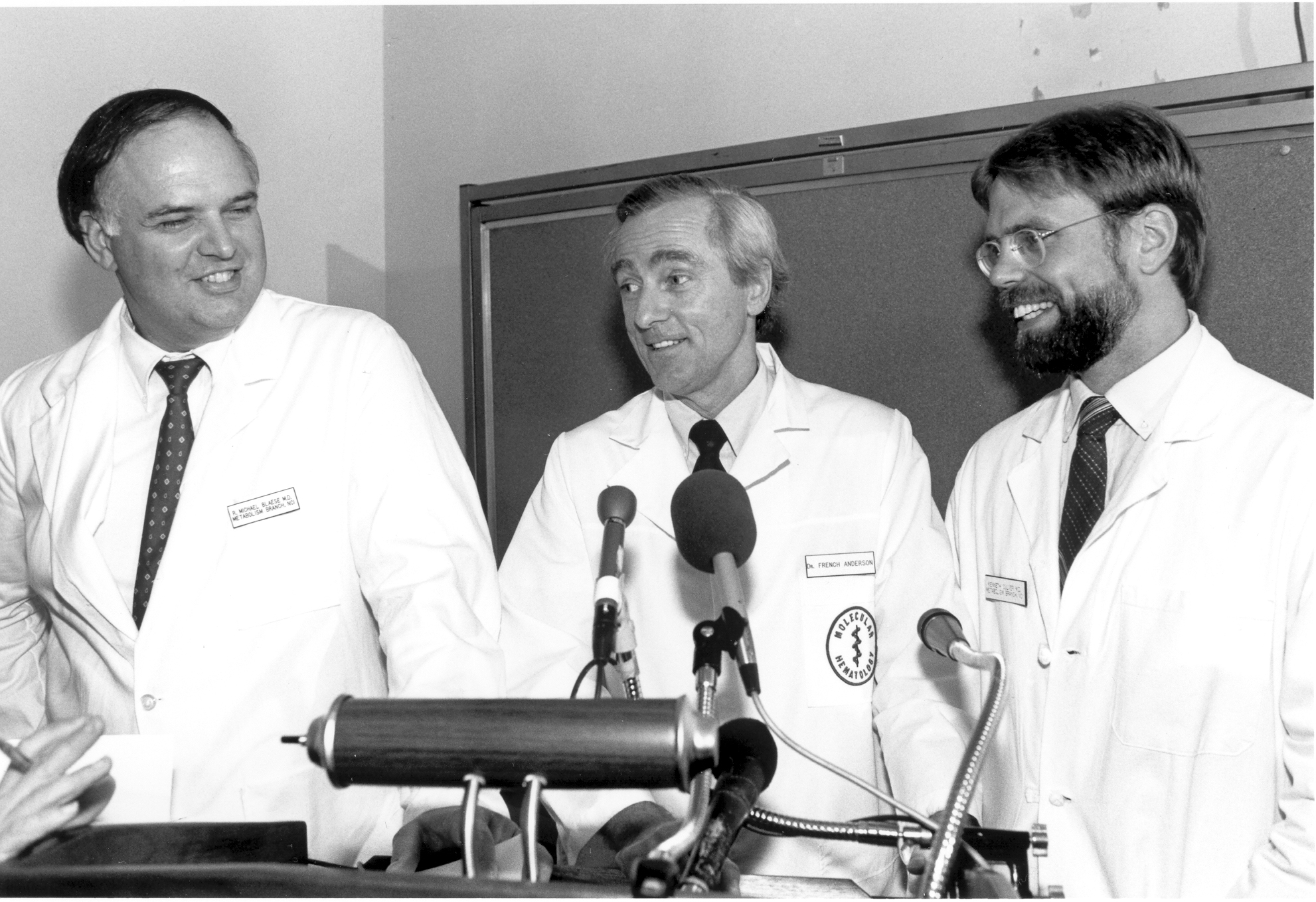
Scientists R. Michael Blaese, W. French Anderson, and Kenneth Culver at the press conference that announced the start of the first ever gene therapy trial for severe combined immunodeficiency (SCID) in 1990.

The first speculation about the plausibility of introducing DNA sequences into patient's cells to cure diseases occurred in the 1960s. Then in 1972, Theodore Friedman and Richard Roblin published a paper in Science named "Gene Therapy for Human Genetic Diseases?", which detailed the possibility of inserting unmutated or healthy DNA to cure patients with genetic diseases. However, this paper also urged that the technology be furthered with caution as a result of the lack of understanding of the technology and its potential effects. They were primarily worried about the lack of knowledge about genetic recombination and gene regulation, lack of understanding about the relationship between genetic mutations and diseases, and the lack of understanding of the potential side effects of gene therapy.

For 18 years after that paper was published, further research was conducted to help limit the risks detailed by Theodore Friedman and Richard Roblin. Then in 1990, the first successful gene therapy trial was launched. A four-year-old girl named Ashanthi De Silva with severe combined immunodeficiency (SCID) was treated with gene therapy. Ashanthi was lacking the enzyme adenosine deaminase (ADA), which caused her T-cells to die, leaving her with little to no protection against infection. To treat this, Dr. W. French Anderson from the National Heart, Lung, and Blood Institute in Bethesda, Maryland, delivered the correct ADA gene, using a disabled virus, to white blood cells that had been removed from her body, and then injected the cells back into her body.

The rise of gene therapy was not easy as it suffered a major setback in 1999 with the trials at the University of Pennsylvania. During the trials, an 18-year-old named Jesse Gelsinger who had the genetic disease ornithine transcarbamylase deficiency, died from an immune response after being treated with a working gene carried by an adenovirus.

The early 2010s brought back the evolution of gene therapy as a potential cure to many different diseases. New delivery methods for the gene therapies were discovered, thus making the techniques significantly safer. Researchers also added enhancers and promoters, which allowed for better control of the gene as they could decide when and where it would be turned on and to what extent. These discoveries, along with others made during this period, allowed gene therapy to regain its momentum and move to the forefront of Medical Technology development. There was then a wave of approvals for gene therapy techniques from 2003 to 2012, including therapies for cancer, artery disease, and others. Since then, the rate of development and approval of gene therapies has increased, with the FDA expecting to approve between 10 and 20 gene therapies each year until 2025.

== Economy ==
The D.C. / Maryland area has the second-highest rated life science hub in the United States, with Maryland alone providing 44,260 jobs in life science. Maryland life science businesses generated over $18.6 billion in 2018, paid over $4.9 billion in wages, with an average salary of $110,690. Maryland also boasted the 5th highest concentration of doctoral scientists and engineers and the highest STEM concentration in the country in 2022. Between 2017 and 2022, the life science research jobs increased by 19%, which was larger than the national growth rate of 16%, indicating a particular focus on the industry in Maryland.

The region has more than double the amount of federal research labs than any other state, partly due to the presence of the NIH headquarters in Bethesda, Maryland. Maryland also has the 11th lowest unemployment rate at 2.5% in 2023, which is partly a result of the booming biotech and life science industry in the area.

=== Housing ===
Maryland, and by association DNA Valley, has a severe affordable housing shortage, with only approximately 30 affordable and available rental units for every 100 extremely low income families and a total housing shortage of 120,000 units. This is possibly due to the boom in life science jobs in the area, while the creation of housing units has remained constant, leading to the imbalance. DNA Valley also includes some of the highest cost of living areas in the country, with D.C. having the second highest and Maryland having the sixth highest.

== Demographics ==
Depending on what geographic regions (particularly parts of Washington, D.C.) are included in the meaning of the term, the population of DNA Valley is between 2 million and 3.5 million. According to the U.S. Census Bureau, almost a third of DNA Valley's population is Black or of African descent, 11% are of Hispanic descent and 6.9% is of Asian descent.

=== Diversity ===
DNA Valley is one of the most diverse areas in the country, with 3 of the 10 most diverse communities in the area, those being Gaithersburg, Germantown, and Silver Spring. Biotechnology as a whole is not a typically diverse field, being overwhelmingly dominated by white (56%) and Asian (21%) employees. Even greater disparity is seen among executives, with 72% of execs being White and 15% being Asian. The biotech hub in DNA Valley tends to differ from this norm, likely due to the diversity of the area.

==== Gender ====
Similarly to race, gender disparity is quite significant in the field of biotechnology, with males dominating the space, particularly in positions of power. 66% of executives and 79% of CEOs are men. DNA Valley follows this trend, as in 2021, women only made up around 22% of the executive positions at biotechnology companies. One possible explanation for this, as proposed by Harvard Senior Research Associate Vivek Wadhwa, is that parents tend to not encourage their daughters to pursue a career in science and engineering as much as they would with their sons. Wadhwa also cites the lack of potential role models for women in the science and engineering fields in comparison to men.

However, interestingly, Maryland has the highest average salary for female CEOS, at around $280,000, which may be in part due to the higher average salaries in Maryland in general. Washington D.C. also has the second-highest female CEO percentage in the country at 47.5%, which would change the DNA Valley numbers depending on whether you include D.C. in the geographical boundaries of the region. There have been concerted efforts to fix the current lack of females in Maryland life science fields, including the founding of a Women in Bio (WIB) chapter in the D.C. region in 2011. The focus of this chapter is to promote diversity and inclusion for all women in life science-related fields. WIB also sponsors the Herstory Gala, in Rockville, Maryland every year to celebrate the women trailblazers in life sciences that have had an impact on the field in the DNA Valley area.

==== Statistics ====
Maryland, and thus DNA Valley, is considered one of the most diverse states in the country, based both on religious and ethnic group diversity. DNA Valley's population is made up of 32% Black, 7% Asian, 12% Hispanic or Latino, and 1% Native American people. In terms of religious affiliations, DNA Valley's population is divided into 69% Christian-based faiths (mostly made up of equal percentages of Evangelical Protestant, Mainline Protestant, Historically Black Protestant, and Catholic), 23% not affiliated with any faith, and 8% having non-Christian-based faiths, primarily made up of Jewish, Muslim, Buddhist, and Hindu faiths

== Education ==
The funding for public schools in DNA Valley varies drastically depending on the area as a result of increased grants from private foundations in wealthier areas such as Montgomery County and particularly Bethesda. Less wealthy areas such as Garret County rely on state funding

== See also ==
- List of technology centers
- List of life sciences
