= Northwest Federal Credit Union =

American credit union

- Formerly: CIA Federal Credit Union (1947–1955)
- Company type: Credit union
- Industry: Financial services
- Founded: 1947
- Headquarters: Herndon, Virginia, United States
- Key people: Jeff Bentley, President & CEO
- Products: Savings; checking; loans; mortgages; credit cards; certificates; insurance; online banking
- Subsidiaries: NWFCU Foundation
- Website: nwfcu.org

Northwest Federal Credit Union (NWFCU) is an American credit union based in Herndon, Virginia. The company was founded as CIA Federal Credit Union in 1947 and was renamed in 1955. Northwest has over US$4 billion in assets and is regulated by the National Credit Union Administration (NCUA), serving more than 279,000 members throughout Northern Virginia and Maryland.

== History ==
The company began in 1947 as the CIA Federal Credit Union to service civilian employees of the Central Intelligence Agency. Plans for an agency-specific credit union were initially outlined in August, under the CIA's predecessor Central Intelligence Group, and approved on August 12 by Director Roscoe H. Hillenkoetter. The Federal Deposit Insurance Corporation formally accepted the union's creation on November 19.

Its membership was expanded to include CIA workers in other fields in 1950, while military personnel attached to the agency became eligible six years later. Retired employees were permitted to remain with the credit union in 1970. With the increased scope, the firm was renamed Northwest Federal Credit Union on March 14, 1955, while the headquarters were moved from Washington, D.C., to McLean, Virginia, in 1962. Although the NWFCU continued to cover CIA employees following the name change and its documents can be subject to Freedom of Information Act requests, it is independent from the agency and has rejected CIA inquiries into employee financial information under the Privacy Act of 1974. Northwest's philanthropic arm has maintained a partnership with the Central Intelligence Retirees Association since 2007 to provide scholarships for the children and grandchildren of CIRA members.

In October 2005, New Horizon Credit Union (NHCU) located in Chantilly, Virginia, merged with Northwest which expanded Northwest’s membership by 4,000 people.

In August 2012, Northwest merged with 3-year old Realtors Federal Credit Union gaining 7,800 members and extending their reach to offer membership to 1 million realtors across the nation.

Northwest's third merger in July 2019 with Constellation Federal Credit Union gained the organization 8,000 new members.

== Operations ==
The credit union has 11 branches throughout the DMV area with plans to open additional locations.

In addition to its primary financial services, Northwest houses three wholly owned subsidiaries under its Northwest Capital Management arm.

- Northwest Title & Escrow is a licensed, bonded, full-service title and escrow agency offering Washington, DC metropolitan area individuals and businesses expert mortgage settlement and title insurance services.
- Northwest Financial Advisors offers a comprehensive range of personalized wealth management advice and solutions to help individuals and business owners work toward creating, growing, and preserving their assets.
- NW Insurance Agency consists of independent insurance agents and support staff delivering a range of insurance services including vehicle, property, business, life insurance and more.

== Sports partnerships ==
In May 2018, Northwest acquired the naming rights for Pfitzner Stadium in Woodbridge, Virginia, renaming it to Northwest Federal Field at Pfitzner Stadium. The Potomac Nationals, the minor league baseball team who were the primary users of the space, played their last regular season game there in August 2019 before the team relocated to Fredericksburg ending the naming-rights deal with Northwest.

In 2024, Northwest signed a multi-year partnership with the Washington Commanders to become the official credit union of the football team as well as the presenting partner of their "High School Game of the Week" program and the "Commanders Read" community program, among others. Northwest also agreed to an eight-year deal that expanded the partnership with the Commanders to be the naming rights partner of their home stadium in Landover, Maryland, renaming it to Northwest Stadium.
