= AJAS =

Ajas is a village in Jammu and Kashmir, India.

AJAS or Ajas may refer to:

== People ==
- Christophe Ajas (born 1972), French footballer

== Other uses ==
- Adelaide Japanese Animation Society
- African Journal of Aquatic Science
- American Journal of Applied Sciences
- American Journal of Arabic Studies
- American Junior Academy of Sciences, a program of the National Association of the Academics of Science
- Arkansas Junior Academy of Science
- Asian-Australasian Journal of Animal Sciences
- Association of Jewish Aging Services
- Australasian Journal of American Studies

== See also ==
- AIAS (disambiguation)
- Aja (disambiguation), for "Ajas" as plural of "Aja"
