= H-B Woodlawn =

Public school in Virginia, United States

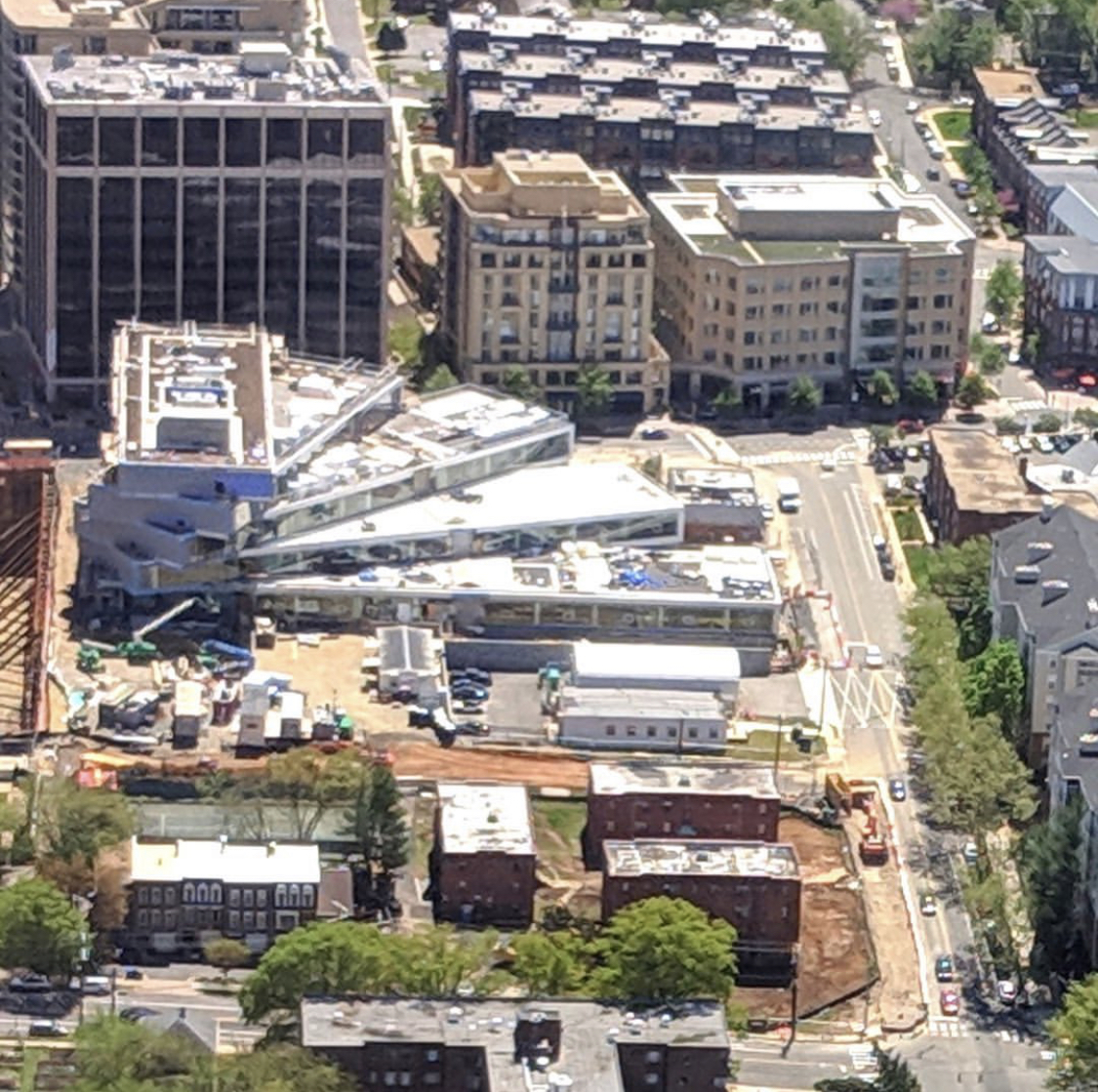

Location
- 1601 Wilson Blvd; Arlington, Virginia 22209; United States; 38°53′40.9″N 77°4′39.8″W

Information
- School type: Public Alternative-education program
- Motto: Verbum Sap Sat (A Word to the Wise is Sufficient)
- Founded: February 4, 1978; 48 years ago
- School district: Arlington Public Schools
- Superintendent: Francisco Duran
- Principal: Casey Robinson
- Grades: 6–12
- Enrollment: 708 (January 2019)
- Language: English
- Campus: Urban
- Website: https://hbwoodlawn.apsva.us/

The H-B Woodlawn Secondary Program, commonly referred to as H-B, or HBW, is a democratic alternative all-county public school located in Arlington County, Virginia, based on the liberal educational movements of the 1960s and 1970s. The school, which serves grades 6 through 12, is a part of the Arlington Public Schools district.

The current program is a combination of two earlier programs, Hoffman-Boston, a 7th through 9th grade school founded in 1972 and Woodlawn, a 10th through 12th grade program founded in 1971 by Ray Anderson, Jeffrey Kallen, Bill Hale, and others who felt a pressing need to provide a more individualized, caring environment to students.

== History ==
=== The Woodlawn Program begins ===
With the alternative education movement in full stride in the late 60s and 70s, there was growing demand for such a school in Arlington. In 1969 Experiments in Free-form Education (EFFE) were conducted at each of the Arlington high schools, in response to the dissatisfaction many students, parents, and teachers had expressed with the current policies. Ray Anderson and Mary McBride were two of the teachers at Wakefield to participate in this program. The following year there was a request from many students for a "student bill of rights," including Jeffrey Kallen, a highly involved student at Washington-Liberty. When Ray Anderson announced a proposal to start an alternative school in one of the closing elementary schools, there was overwhelming support. Soon after the Citizen's Committee for the New School was established, a more detailed memorandum was submitted to the school board. By the end of that May, the proposal had been further refined, endorsed by the superintendent, and accepted by the school board. The school was housed in what had been the Woodlawn Elementary School, and what is now the Hospice of Northern Virginia

=== Merger ===
The Hoffman-Boston Program (founded in 1972) and the Woodlawn Program (founded in 1971), contained junior high and high school programs respectively, which both embraced the idea of alternative education. Originally, Hoffman-Boston had some 169 students. Woodlawn had 69 students, grades 11 and 12, in its first year of operation, adding 10th grade and expanding to some 169 students in the second year. Donald Brandewie was the founding principal of Hoffman-Boston and served for three years, after which Margery Edson became principal. Woodlawn, which was then a haven for "anti-establishment" types, had no principal. Ray Anderson served as Head Teacher and served as administrator for the program. With dwindling school populations in Arlington County in the mid-1970s, there was a belief that 9th grade should be moved up from the (then) Junior High Schools to the High Schools. This move would have impacted negatively on the two programs, so a movement started to merge, which was ordered by the School Board to take place in the fall. After a year of careful planning, discussion, and hard work by the administration, staff, students, and alumni of the two programs, a comprehensive merger plan and combined philosophy was adopted, and this document served as the "blueprint" for the initial years of the combined program. The two schools joined in the former Stratford Junior High School building on Vacation Lane in the fall of 1979. (On an unrelated note, Stratford Junior High School was the first racially integrated school in Arlington, bringing an end to "Massive Resistance" in the state in the 1960s). The Stratford Junior High School building was listed on the National Register of Historic Places.

=== Relocation to Rosslyn ===
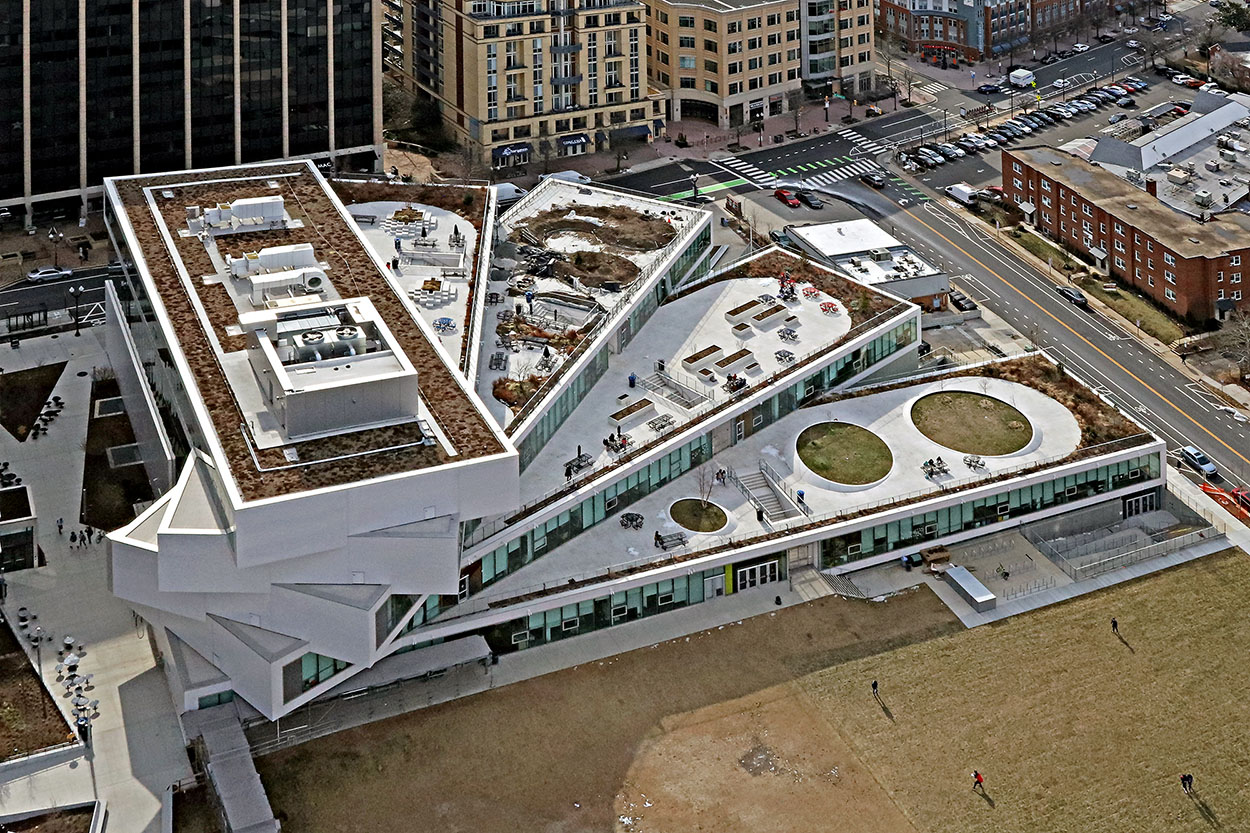
H-B Woodlawn, Rosslyn VA

In 2014, the Arlington School Board identified a need for additional middle school capacity in the north-central area of the county. After contentious public debate over various options, it was determined that the Stratford building was the best location for a new middle school, and another location would be chosen for H-B Woodlawn. On December 18, 2014 the School Board voted to construct a new building for H-B Woodlawn in the Rosslyn neighborhood of Arlington, Virginia, on property that was formerly home to Wilson School and Rosslyn Highlands Park. The Wilson School was demolished in 2017, and construction began on the new building at 1601 Wilson Blvd. (See side panel for full address). The new building was mostly completed and ready for use in late summer 2019. It featured 7 levels (basement, ground, 1–5), of which the basement and ground floors are underground, with the rest in a fanning shape above ground. Schooling began in the new building in the 2019–2020 school year, starting September 3, 2019, with some students happy about the change and others not. The building was completed at a cost of $100 million.

== Student rights ==
H-B is notable for its open and liberal culture which allows students many rights and privileges not traditionally given to students. Many of these are seen by the community as promoting a culture of mutual respect between students, teachers and administrators.

- Students call teachers by their first name (ex: John rather than Mr. Doe)
- With parental permission, students have "off campus" privileges meaning they can leave campus and go anywhere, anytime in 8-12 grade. Students in 6-7 grade can go into buildings adjacent to campus.
- There is no dress code.
- Students make their own schedule every year.
- Students control hiring decisions (through a committee that contains some administrators but majority students).
- Students control capital allocation (including which courses to offer), beyond what is required by the Commonwealth of Virginia.
- No required areas to eat/socialize during lunch or other breaks during the day.
- A vote at Town Meeting (the governing body of HBW).

== Special rankings ==
H-B Woodlawn was rated 1st in the 2005 Challenge Index in the area. It received an Equity and Excellence rating of 82.7% that year. In the 2006 survey by Newsweek ranking high schools nationwide, H-B Woodlawn ranked several slots below its previous position - 13 (compared with number 5 in the 2005 survey). In the 2017 Challenge Index, H-B Woodlawn was ranked as the most challenging school in Virginia, and 108 in the nation.

There is some controversy in ranking H-B Woodlawn nationally as a "school". Students do not actually receive diplomas from H-B Woodlawn, but rather their home schools from around Arlington county. Students do receive an honorary "diploma" from the H-B Woodlawn Program.

== Athletics ==
The only sport offered at H-B Woodlawn is Ultimate Frisbee. Students at H-B Woodlawn play all other sports at their home school. A "sports bus" picks up students in the afternoon and drops them off at their home school in time for practice.

== Town Meeting ==
Every other Thursday there is a "Town Meeting," usually held in the library at 9:53 AM. There, students, teachers, and administrators can vote on important school issues and make announcements to the school. At the beginning of each meeting, students are elected to chair, co-chair and secretary positions. The meeting then follows a modified version of Robert's Rules of Order. The agenda for Town Meeting can include club meeting announcements, organizing upcoming events, future course offerings, and the allocation of department funds. Anyone in the H-B Woodlawn community is allowed to participate in discussion, and attendance fluctuates based on community interest in agenda items. Participants use a silent method to express agreement and disagreement (the American Sign Language for "yes" and "no," respectively).

== Traditions ==
The school's motto is Verbum Sap Sat, short for the Latin Verbum sapienti sat est, meaning "A Word to the Wise is Sufficient."

H-B Woodlawn is run on the belief that left with responsibilities, students will learn and get work done. They are given privileges such as going off campus, going to Town Meeting, etc.

Another tradition is the Teacher/Senior Play, at the beginning of the year, and the Teacher Play, at the end of the year. Since 1971, it has been tradition for the students to interrupt the Head Teacher (now Principal), of not allowing them to speak by clapping for roughly five minutes any time the Head Teacher speaks at the school.

Before Thanksgiving break, H-B's physical education teachers organize the Turkey Bowl, where the freshman, sophomore, junior and senior classes face off in flag football.

On Halloween, or the nearest school day to it, H-B Woodlawn hosts a costume contest, dancing contest, and student created/led activities around the school.

The most notable tradition is H-B graduation. It takes place in their gym. It is generally informal (family and friends are encouraged to bring lawn chairs). Each Teacher Advisor presents their graduating seniors and write a two- to five-minute speech about their experience at H-B. This unorthodox practice makes H-B's graduation much longer than most high school graduations. In addition to the speeches, teacher advisers present their students with gag gifts and leis. At the end of graduation (as well as at the end of the year play), H-B's principal, Casey, and other faculty perform renditions of "Feet of a Dancer" by Charlie McGettigan. Students are encouraged to sing along.

The unofficial school color is Tie Dye, and their mascot as decided by Town Meeting in 2023 is a hump-back whale, because HumpBack Whale, HBW! While the Frisbee team uses the mascot of the Panda.

== Notable alumni ==
- Wendy MacLeod
- Cutter Hodierne
- Nicholas Kulish
- Lisa Moscatiello
- Dave Nachmanoff
- Jeffrey Nachmanoff
- Nathan Lyon (chef)
- Leah Siegel
