= Wakefield Warriors =

Wakefield Warriors may refer to:

- Athletic teams and programs of Wakefield Memorial High School (Massachusetts)
- Athletic teams and programs of Wakefield High School (Arlington County, Virginia)
