= Nottingham Elementary School =

Nottingham Elementary School may refer to:

- Nottingham Elementary School (Houston, Texas)
- Nottingham Elementary School (Arlington County, Virginia)
- Nottingham Elementary School (Oxford, Pennsylvania)
