= Harun Iman =

Somali-American former middle-distance runner

Personal information
- Nationality: Somali; American
- Born: May 29, 1981 (age 45) Mogadishu, Somalia

Sport
- Sport: Track
- Event: 800 metres
- College team: Arkansas
- Coached by: John McDonnell

Achievements and titles
- Personal best: 800m: 1:48.19

Harun Iman (born May 29, 1981) is a Somali-American former middle-distance runner who specialized in the 800 meters. He began running competitively at Wakefield High School of Arlington, Virginia, after which he competed for a noted generation of the Arkansas track team. After his time at Arkansas, he qualified for and completed in the men's 800 at the 2006 USA Outdoor T&F Championships.

== Running career ==
=== High school ===
Iman attended Wakefield High School in Arlington, Virginia until he graduated in 2000. During high school, he ran in several events up to the 1600 meters, although was most competitive in the 800. From 1998 to 2000, he won in four events in the indoor National District championships. In 1999, he won the boy's indoor 1000 meters in a time of 2:42.26 at the TJ Community Center. In 2000, he won back-to-back races at the indoor National District meet, winning the 1000 in 2:44.93 and the 1600 meters in 4:33.14. In the 2000 winter indoor season he made it to the VHSL Indoor State Championship, where he placed 13th overall. In outdoor track, he was most successful in the 800, and placed third overall in the boy's 800 in 1:54.78 at the 2000 VHSL Group AAA State Outdoor Championships, right behind Alan Webb.

=== Collegiate ===
Iman was recruited to University of Arkansas, whose middle-distance program at the time was coached by John McDonnell. At Arkansas, Iman competed in the 800, the men's distance medley relay, and occasionally would race the mile indoors. At the 2005 NCAA DI Indoor T&F Championships, Iman ran UA's 800-meter leg in the men's distance medley race and had a lead over the entire field before handing it off to 1600-meter anchorman Said Ahmed. Ahmed was involved in a controversial finish when the meet judge claimed there was contact between him and Nathan Brannen of Michigan and subsequently gave the Arkansas men's distance medley team a disqualification mark. If it weren't for the disqualification, Iman and the Arkansas distance medley men would have recorded a result of 9:30.79, which would have been one of the fastest indoor times of that event recorded in NCAA history.

=== Post-collegiate ===
After graduating college, Iman ran the men's 800 at the 2006 USA Outdoor Track and Field Championships, where he was seeded in heat 3. Out of the ten athletes in his heat, he was only one of two non-professionals. He finished in 8th with a time of 1:48.45.
