= John Hazel =

John Hazel may refer to:

- John R. Hazel, American jurist and politician
- John Hazel (footballer), Scottish footballer
- Til Hazel (John Tilghman Hazel Jr.), American attorney and real-estate developer
