= Amherst Ultimate Invitational Tournament =

The Amherst Ultimate Invitational Tournament is the oldest high school Ultimate Frisbee tournament in the United States. The first tournament was played in 1992. Each year, 30 highly competitive teams from the Northeast converge on Amherst. The current champions (2018) are Amherst Regional High School (boys) and H-B Woodlawn (girls). In 2010, the tournament hosted thirty teams, with twenty being made up of boys, and ten for girls.
