= TROFREC =

Thai research center

Coordinates: 16.476768°N 102.821893°E

Tropical Feed Resources Research and Development Center (TROFREC) (Thai: ศูนย์วิจัยและพัฒนาทรัพยากรอาหารสัตว์เขตร้อน) is a research centers at the Faculty of Agriculture, Khon Kaen University, Thailand.

TROFREC's mandate is to undertake research work in areas of animal feed resources, feeding systems, technology transfers in related areas, as well as human resources development ranging from farmers to technical/academic and higher-learning personnel.

Research projects include the uses of urea-treated rice straw, cassava hay, cass-soy pellet, high-quality feed block, cassava hay-urea pellet, cass-bann, rumen manipulation and rumen microbes; water buffalo rumen ecology, herbs uses in non-ruminants and ruminants, and feeding systems based on agricultural crop-residues, by-products and total mixed rations.

TROFREC is headed by its director, Professor Dr Metha Wanapat.
