= Yorktown High School (Arlington County, Virginia) =

Public high school in Virginia, US

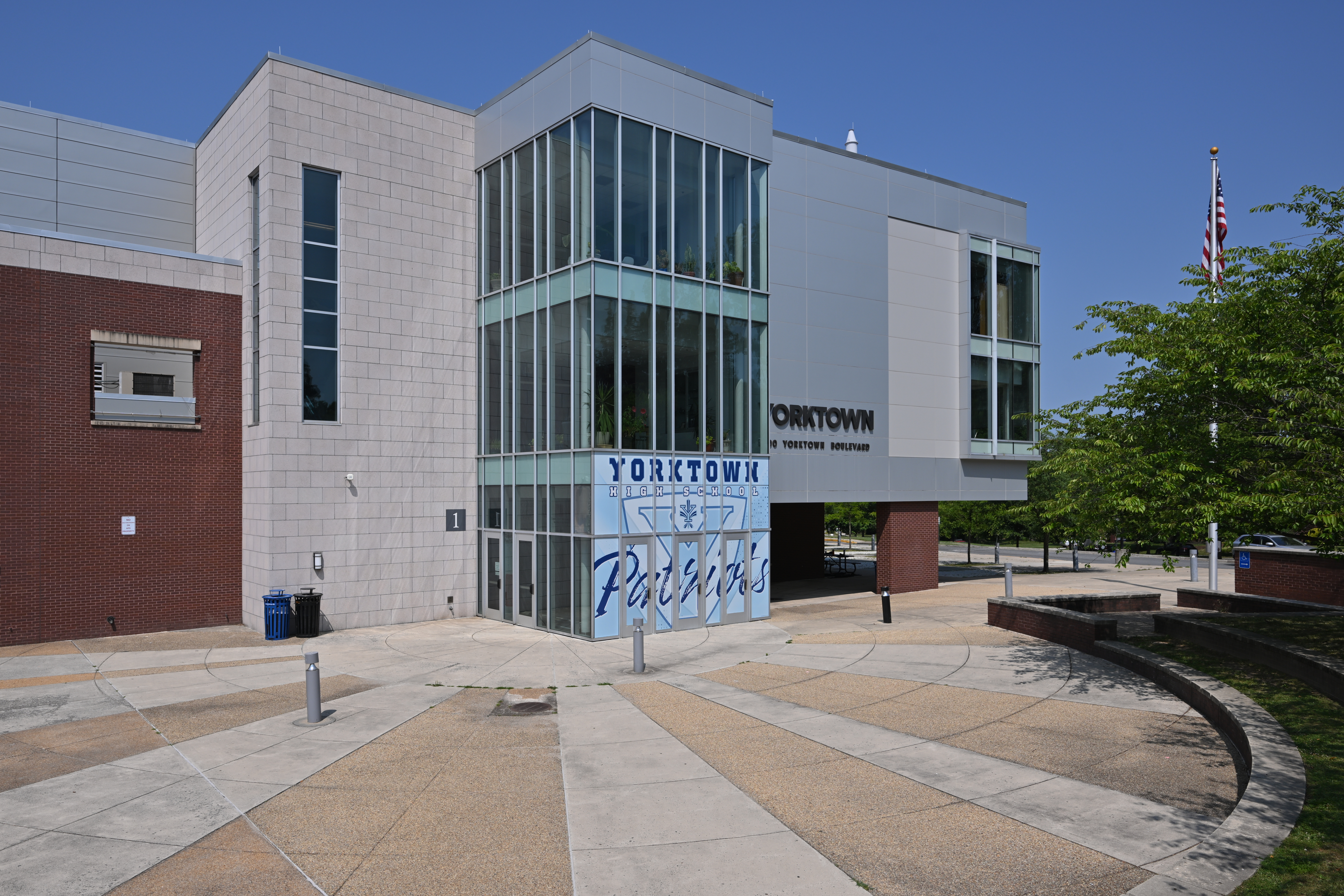

Location
- 5200 Yorktown Blvd; Arlington, Virginia 22207; 38.903458°N 77.139151°W

Information
- School type: Public, high school
- Founded: 1960; 66 years ago
- School board: Arlington Public Schools
- School district: Arlington Public Schools
- Principal: Kevin Clark
- Faculty: 137.66 FTEs
- Grades: 9–12
- Enrollment: 2,496 (2019–20)
- Student to teacher ratio: 18.12
- Language: English
- Campus: Suburban
- Colors: Columbia blue and white
- Mascot: Patriots
- Rival: Washington-Liberty High School; Wakefield High School
- Athletic conferences: AAA Liberty District; Northern Region
- Website: https://yhs.apsva.us

Yorktown High School is a public high school located in Arlington County, Virginia, United States. There are around 240 teachers and 2100 students as of 2019. In 2022–23 school year, there were 2,577 students. Yorktown's attendance area makes up the northern third of Arlington County.

Yorktown is an accredited high school based on Virginia's Standards of Learning (SOL) examinations, and is accredited by the Southern Association of Colleges and Schools. The school was ranked among the top 100 schools in the nation by Newsweek in 2008.

== History ==
The school building opened in January 1950 as an elementary school, The Yorktown School, and it was later converted into a high school. It was called Yorktown from its opening. At that time it was a one-story building and only housed the elementary students.

The high school opened for the first time for the 1960–61 school year, with only sophomores and juniors. The first graduating class was in 1962. The original elementary school was converted into a high school to relieve crowding at Washington-Liberty High School.

The school was threatened with closure in 1982 due to declining enrollment, but remained open due to community support. To boost the school's population, the attendance boundary between Washington-Liberty and Yorktown in the northeastern portion of the county was redrawn in 1983. Portions of the Donaldson Run, Cherrydale, Woodmont, Dover Crystal, and Old Dominion neighborhoods were transferred into a larger Yorktown district.

In the 1990s its boundaries expanded once again to serve the communities of Rosslyn, Courthouse, Clarendon, Westover, Halls Hill/Highview Park, and portions of Dominion Hills. An entirely new Yorktown facility opened for the 2013–14 school year, after several years of construction. The replacement campus was designed by Ehrenkrantz Eckstut & Kuhn Architects.

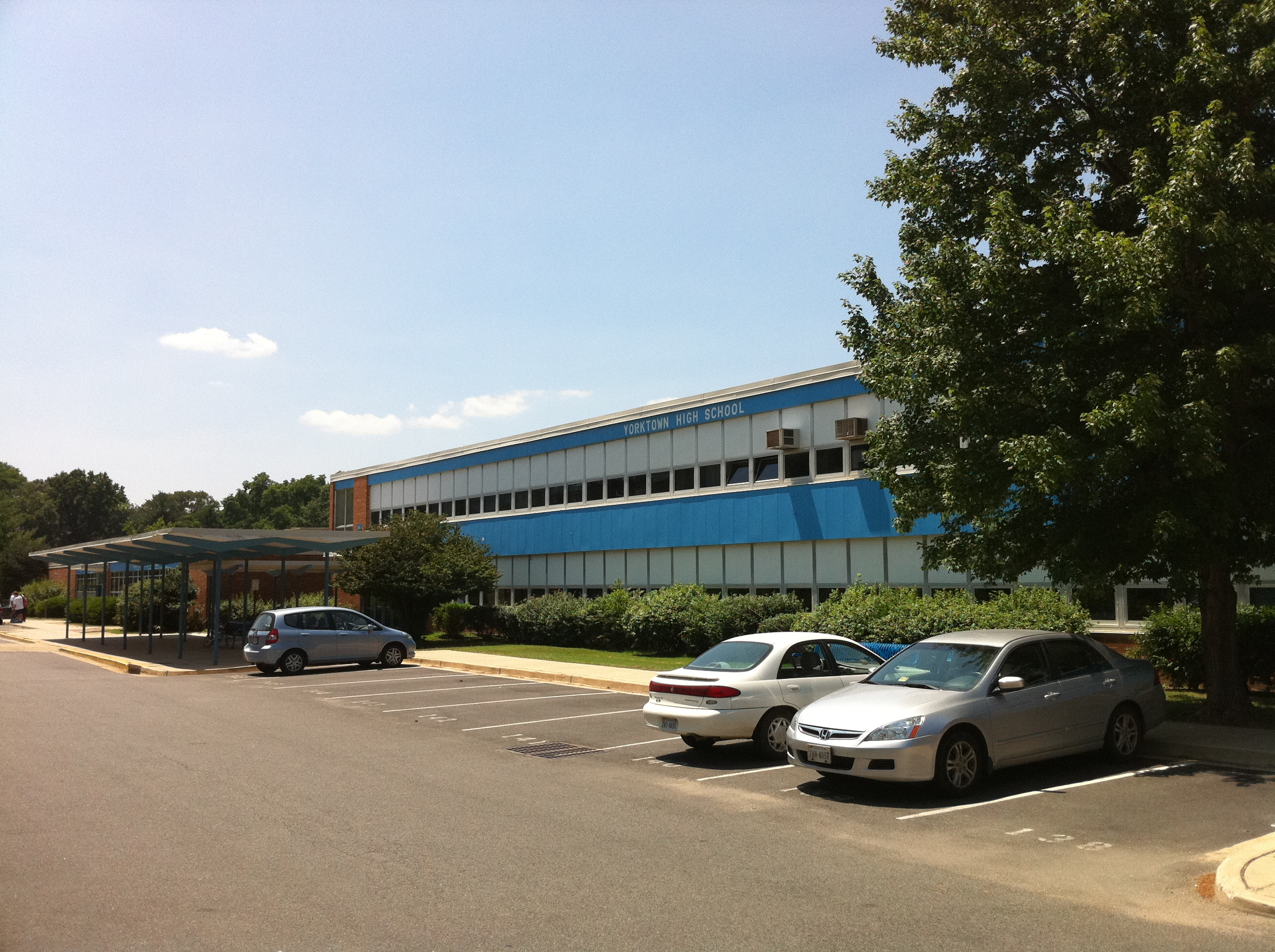
Original front entrance of Yorktown High School, prior to 2010 rebuilding

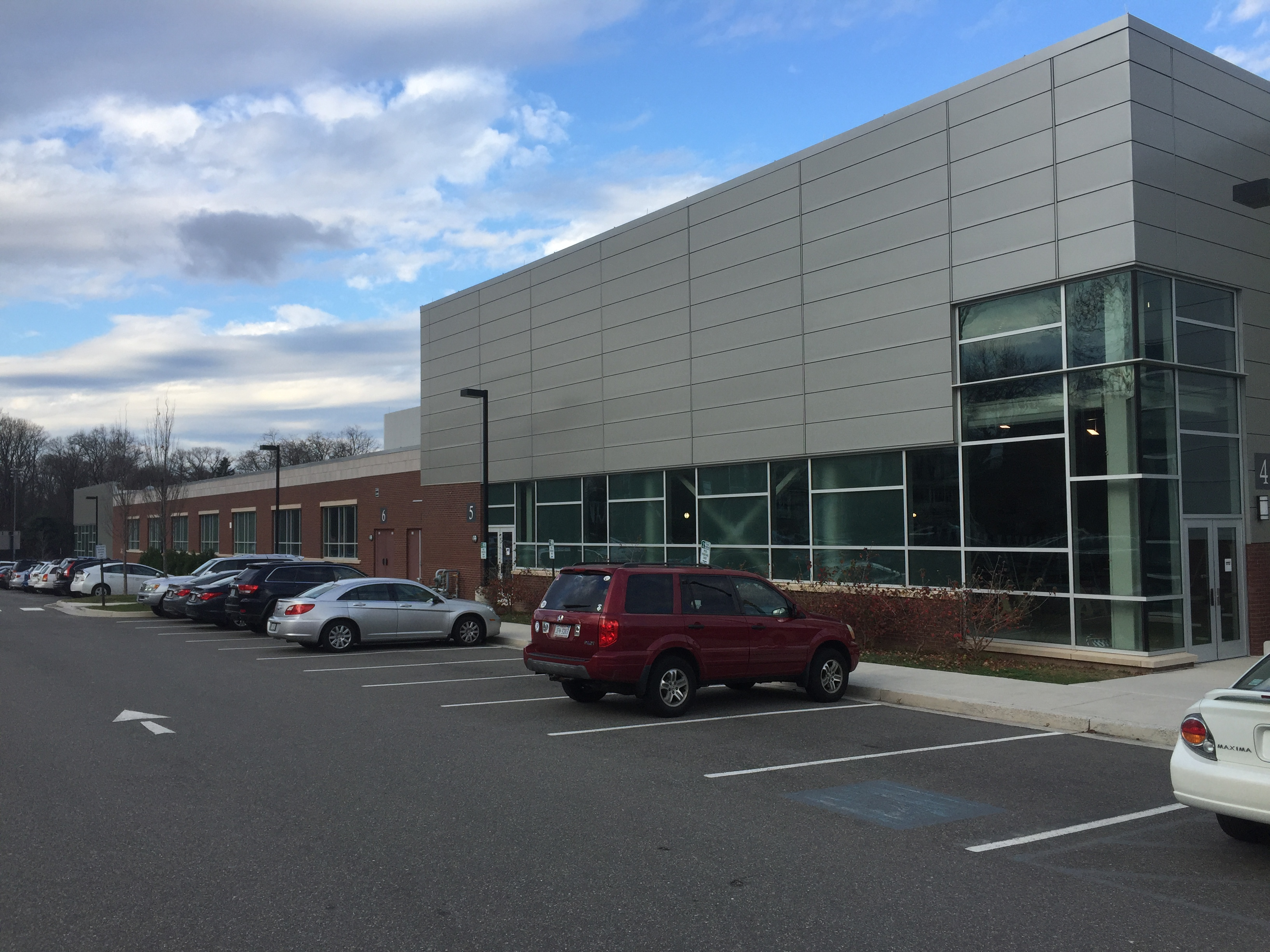
Post-renovation picture, taken from the same perspective as the photo above

== Building structure and location ==
=== Renovation ===
Arlington proposed a Bond Package, approved by voters in 2000. As a result, in 2003, the school added an external wing to the school, containing classrooms and computer lab.

On May 8, 2006, the Arlington County School Board approved a preliminary design to rebuild the building. Voters approved about $25,000,000 for the project in the 2006 elections and $75,000,000 is on the ballot for next year. On February 1, 2007, the School Board unanimously approved the schematic design for the new Yorktown High School.

A new school building opened in September 2004. The athletic fields were renovated in 2007.

In January 2012, Phase II of the construction was completed, including three floors of classrooms, an eight-lane pool with diving well, a wrestling room, weight room and new main gym.

As of March 7, 2018, plans have been approved to go ahead with another renovation to increase the buildings capacity to 2,189 seats. The conversion will add at least 6 classrooms. The project will cost approximately $4,000,000.

== Demographics ==
As of the 2021–2022 school year, the school had an enrollment of 2,531 students and 143.69 classroom teachers (on a full-time equivalent basis), for a student–teacher ratio of 17.61:1. There were 196 students eligible for free lunch and 52 eligible for reduced-cost lunch.

The school's demographic breakdown of the 2022–2023 school year was as follows:

- 61.2% Caucasian
- 16.6% Hispanic
- 7.4% Asian
- 5.5% African-American
- 0.2% American Indian/Alaskan Native
- 0% Native Hawaiian / Other Pacific Islander
- 9.1% Multiple

The vast majority of the school's students reside in the area of the county commonly called "North Arlington" which is the portion of the county north of Arlington Boulevard (US Route 50). The attendance area covers the high rise neighborhood of Rosslyn, which borders Georgetown, all the way to the more suburban neighborhoods of North Arlington bordering Falls Church and McLean. A small portion of McLean (22101) and a small portion of Falls Church (22046) within Arlington County are under the jurisdiction of the Arlington Public Schools and its students attend Yorktown. Many of the neighborhoods in the Yorktown attendance area are also zoned to Washington-Liberty High School. High school boundary changes between the two schools historically have occurred at least once every decade.

== Academics ==
=== Performing arts ===
Yorktown's winter guard has won gold medals in the Atlantic Indoor Association Championships in 2009 and 2010. After 2009 championships, they were promoted to the A3 class; in 2010 to A2.

The school has won Best Color Guard at the 2009 and 2010 USSBA State Championships.

The schools band program has been awarded the title of Virginia Honor Band 8 times, most recently in the 2017-2018 and 2021-2022 school years.

Yorktown's Theatre Arts Program has won various awards. It received the Virginia Theatre Association (VTA) award in 2010. It was a finalist to compete in the Southeastern Theatre Conference. The 2011 and 2012 performances won both ensemble and acting awards from VTA. In 1999, their show ranked 1st in the state.

=== The Yorktown Sentry ===
The school's newspaper, The Yorktown Sentry, has been in publication since 1959.

== Sports ==
The school mascot is the Patriots.

=== Pool and stadiums ===
Yorktown has a public partnership with Arlington County to use the athletic facilities of Greenbrier Park for softball, baseball, and track & field events.

The Yorktown swimming pool is operated by Arlington Public Schools. During the week, it is used for the high school physical education program of Yorktown and for students of neighboring elementary schools. The school's swim and dive teams use the facility.

Starting in 2002, the Arlington County School Board intended to spend over $700,000 on the installation and maintenance of new FieldTurf in various athletic fields and stadiums. In 2006, Yorktown's outdoor stadium was the last of the three Arlington high schools to undergo installation.

=== Football ===
The Yorktown High School football team's head coach was Bruce Hanson from 1984 to 2024. However, in December 2024, Hanson's replacement - Alec Hicks, who was assistant coach for 20 seasons - was announced.

== Notable alumni ==
- James K. Baker, 1963, co-founder of Dragon Systems and inventor of mechanisms used in Apple Inc.'s Siri
- David Blumenthal, 1970, pianist, concert musician, and chamber artist
- David M. Brown, 1974, astronaut
- Emily Couric, 1965, former Virginia state senator
- Katie Couric 1975, American broadcast journalist and author
- Jeannemarie Devolites Davis c. 1974, former Virginia state legislator
- Tom Dolan, 1993, Olympic gold medalist swimmer
- Lauren Flynn 2020, soccer player
- Greg Garcia, c. 1988, television producer
- Torri Huske, 2021, 2020 Summer Olympics swimmer
- Beverly Johnson, 1965, pioneering rock climber and adventurer who skied across Greenland, windsurfed across the Bering Straits, and was the first person to solo cross the Straits of Magellan in an open kayak
- Rich Lowry, 1986, editor-in-chief, National Review
- Heather McHugh, 1965, poet
- Eric Schmidt, 1972, former CEO and executive chairman, Google
- M.J. Stewart, 2014, professional football player, Tampa Bay Buccaneers
- Tatianna, (transferred to Falls Church High School) contestant on RuPaul’s Drag Race season 2 and RuPaul's Drag Race All Stars season 2
- Paul Wellstone, 1962, former U.S. Senator
- Tanner Wall, 2018, professional football player, Las Vegas Raiders
