= High-quality feed block =

High-quality feed block or HQFB, is a solid block consisting of molasses, non-protein nitrogen (NPN), rumen by-pass protein (cassava hay), minerals and lipids. It is provided to livestock ruminants in a manner similar to a salt lick.

HQFB is used for ruminant feeding as a method of improving digestion and to help lactation, reproduction, and weight gain. More details can be searched from AJAS, Asia-Australasian Journal of Animal Sciences.

Feed blocks are cost-effective food supplements that are used in preserving high moisture agro-industrial by-products. The general formula of feed blocks includes binders, a preservative, a mixture of ingredients that contain the desired nutrients (nitrogen, minerals, vitamins) and one of many energy rich agro-industrial by-products, such as molasses. The levels of these substances may vary, as well as the main component of the block, in different regions or countries. The main ingredient may vary from date pulp, rice bran and poultry waste in Iraq, tomato pulp and olive cake in Tunisia, brewery grains and olive cake in Jordan or molasses in Morocco. Feed blocks aid small scale farmers as conventional feed, such as barley grain or bran, are often expensive.

A major function of high-quality feed blocks is to promote microbial activity in ruminant animals, thus improving digestion of lower quality roughages or feed, such as low quality hays, straw, stubble, etc. High-quality feed blocks may also be treated with anthelmintic medicines for treatment against parasites in animals. High-quality feed blocks also have a significant effect on ruminant reproduction. The supplemental energy and nutrients from the feed block helps reduces weight loss in animals, as well as improved fertility, and lambing rates. This is significant during summer when natural feed does not contain enough of the essential nutrients required of animals for reproduction.

High-quality feed blocks have been observed to have a noticeable effect on milk yield composition and yield in dairy cows. In addition with a concentrate mixture that consisted mainly of cassava chips, palm kernel meal, cottonseed meal, kapok meal and soybean meal, cows that are fed the concentrate that was supplemented with the high-quality feed block not only result in a higher milk yield, fat content was also significantly higher. The feed block also attributes additional nutrients to cows and weight loss prevention.
