= Dorothy Hamm =

American civil rights activist

- Born: 1919; Caroline County, Virginia, U.S.
- Died: May 14, 2004 (aged 84–85); Richmond, Virginia, U.S.
- Education: Miner Teacher's College
- Occupations: educator, activist

Dorothy Hamm (1919-2004) was a leading figure in the civil rights movement in the Commonwealth of Virginia, an author, teacher, and elections officer.

== Life and activism ==
Hamm was born in 1919 in Caroline County, Virginia. She attended Miner Teachers College. In 1942, she married Edward Leslie Hamm, Sr. with whom she had three children.

Hamm led efforts to desegregate schools in Virginia, to improve fairness in elections, and for equal access to jobs, housing, restaurants, theatres, and hospital rooms. She was a plaintiff in five landmark court cases affecting civil rights, including the 1956 decision that ended school segregation in Arlington County, Virginia, adjacent to Washington D.C., the national capital. Her play, "Our Heritage: Slavery to Freedom, 1776–1976," was designated an official bicentennial event by Arlington County. Her documentary, "Our Struggle for Equality–25 Years Ago," is televised annually during Black History Month. In 2018 the Dorothy Hamm Middle School in Arlington, Virginia, was named in her honour.

A resolution passed by the Virginia House of Delegates in 2002 commended her, highlighting the historic nature of her accomplishments, and noted that she "was also a plaintiff in the cases that eliminated the pupil placement form, desegregated all athletics in the Arlington public schools, desegregated theaters in Arlington, and eliminated the poll tax."

Hamm was an officer of elections in Arlington County for more than 27 years. She served as a delegate to Arlington County and state conventions of the Democratic Party in 1964. She was later appointed assistant registrar and a chief election officer in the Woodlawn precinct in Arlington. She worked with the Congress of Racial Equality as they organized in Arlington, and participated in the 1968 Poor People's March on Washington.

Hamm led the establishment of a Head Start program in Arlington in the mid-1960s and taught there for several years. She was also a leader in three churches she attended over the years, including Wright's Chapel United Methodist Church, where she served as secretary, trustee and in the drama group. She received the first Arlington County Martin Luther King Jr. Award for Outstanding Volunteer Service in 1982 and a separate award from the Young Arlington Democrats for "Pioneering Civil Rights in Arlington."

Hamm died on May 14, 2004, in Richmond, Virginia.

In 2018 the Virginia Capitol Foundation announced that Hamm's name would be on the Virginia Women's Monument's glass Wall of Honor.

== Books ==
- Integration of Arlington County Schools: My Story Center for Local History, Arlington County, Virginia, 2002
