= Wakefield High School (Arlington County, Virginia) =

Public high school in Virginia, US

Coordinates: 38.847863°N 77.110119°W

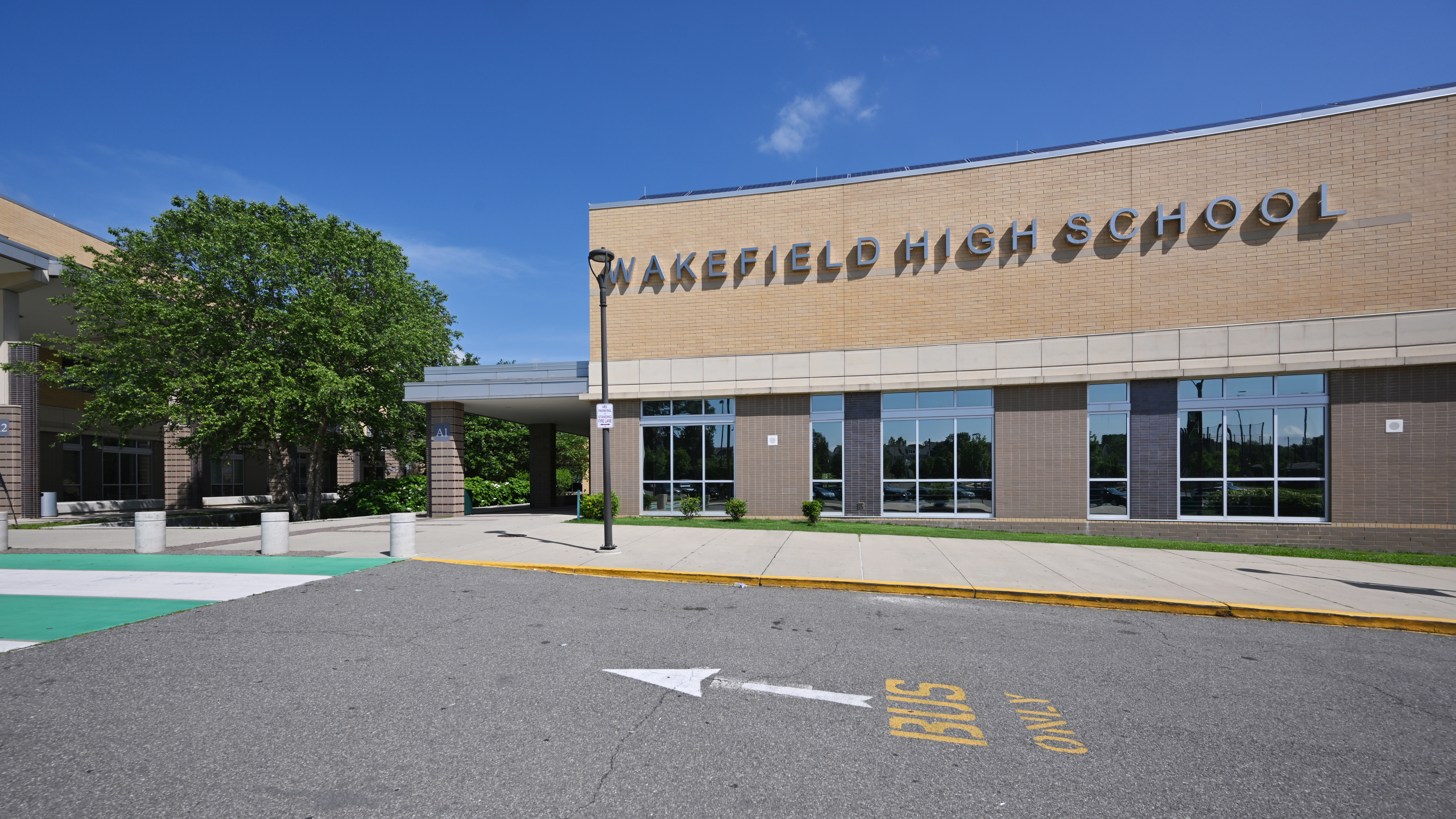

Location
- 1325 South Dinwiddie Street; Arlington, Virginia 22206; United States

Information
- School type: Public, high school
- Motto: "Rigor, Relationships, Resilience, Responsibility, Results"
- Founded: 1952; 74 years ago
- School district: Arlington Public Schools
- Principal: Peter Balas
- Teaching staff: 151.80 (FTE)
- Grades: 9–12
- Enrollment: 2,716 (2023-2024)
- Student to teacher ratio: 17.89
- Language: English
- Campus: Suburban
- Colors: Kelly green and black ██
- Athletics conference: Liberty District; Northern Region
- Mascot: Warrior
- Website: wakefield.apsva.us

Wakefield High School is one of five public high schools located in Arlington, Virginia, United States, closely bordering Alexandria. It has 152 teachers and 2,716 students in grades 9–12 as of the 2023–2024 academic year.

Wakefield's athletes are called the "Warriors" and wear the colors kelly green, white, and black. The school participates in the Virginia High School League. The Warriors are represented by an image of a knight holding a sword, which was preceded by an Indian head until 2003.

== History ==
The school opened for the 1952–1953 school year. During the 1950s, all Wakefield students were white, in accordance with Virginia's laws requiring racial segregation in public schools. Under its current principal Peter Balas, it is administered by the Arlington Public Schools.

=== Alumni Hall of Fame ===
During the celebration of the school's 50th anniversary in 2003, induction to its Hall of Fame began. Additional inductions are made in odd numbered years.

== Building structure and location ==
The original building, which was located at South Chesterfield Road, was built in 1952 and was opened for the 1952-53 school year. In 2007, the county's school board began the planning process for modernization or replacement of the Wakefield building. It will be the third of the county's three high schools to receive a new building, following Washington-Liberty (new academic wing completed in January 2008, full completion expected in late 2009) and Yorktown (construction contemplated following a bond referendum in November 2008). The order of construction of the three schools corresponds to the age of the three existing buildings. The construction on the new building continued as planned, as the new Wakefield High School building opened in late summer of 2013. The original building was demolished after the completion of the new building. Since 2013, the new building is located at South Dinwiddie Street.

== Student life ==
=== Demographics ===
The demographic breakdown of the 2020–2021 school year is as follows:

- 42.6% Hispanic
- 25.9% White
- 18.6% Black
- 7.7% Asian/Pacific Islander
- 5% Multi-ethnic
- .11% American Indian/Alaskan Native
- .11% Native Hawaiian/Pacific Islander/Alaskan Native

As of 2006–2007, 222 students receive ESL support.

Most Wakefield students live in South Arlington, the portion of the county below Arlington Boulevard (US 50). This part of the county is home to many recent immigrants, and the residential areas are some of the most culturally diverse in the nation. The high school attendance boundaries are not fixed and change about once every decade. Historically, the attendance area for Wakefield has extended as far north as the Williamsburg area of Arlington near Mclean, and has at times included other parts of North Arlington near Ballston and Clarendon.

In 2003, Washingtonian Magazine ranked Wakefield as the 17th most diverse high school out of all 128 public and private high schools in the DC metropolitan area.

== Clubs and activities ==
=== The Chieftain ===
Wakefield's school-wide newspaper is The Chieftain. It is a course in journalism offered by the school and is produced solely by students. Stories covered include local and international news, school events, performing arts, athletic development, and the ever-popular "Kiss-O-Gram" (student-to-student messages on Valentine's Day).

=== Starstone ===
Starstone was the title of the Wakefield yearbook until 2003 (the 50th anniversary). Between 2004 and 2017, the yearbook has been retitled each year. In the 2018 yearbook edition, the Starstone title returned as a sub name following the official title of the yearbook.

=== It's Academic team ===
Wakefield sponsors a team of students to participate in the locally televised quiz show, It's Academic. The Warriors have sent the team to Scholastic Bowl tournaments (in addition to It's Academic) and have come home with multiple National District titles.

== Academics ==
=== Special programs ===
The Freshman Foundations Program divides all freshmen into House I, House II, House III, and House IV. Each has a team of teachers with one teacher to a subject or "foundation": English, math, world history, biology, and technology. Each house has its own schedule when it comes to classes, electives, and lunch. Freshmen do not attend Career Center courses. There is also one "team" (known as Team-1) composed of teachers.

Wakefield's Academic Cohort Program identifies African American and Hispanic males in 9th grade who are capable of taking a more demanding courseload. These students are supported through graduation. They meet weekly with a Coordinator, a school counselor, and social worker to lend support to each other as they tackle the demanding coursework.

Lunch Labs are provided to the students in all subject areas and are offered only during lunch. Students go to these labs in an effort to develop their academic lack in the content area (i.e. make up tests, get homework assistance, or study). Some labs are also offered throughout the day and after school.

The Arlington Career Center offers technical courses in Business & Communication, Industry & Engineering, and Health & Human Services.

==== AP Network ====
Wakefield encourages students to take Advanced Placement courses, favoring "preparedness" over intelligence and finesse. The "AP Network", which began as an Exemplary Project approved by the Arlington County School Board in the spring of 2004, is rooted in this belief.

Since the inception, the faculty and staff of Wakefield have been "networking" and creating numerous academic programs to introduce pre-AP and AP courses. Among these programs are the Foundations Pre-AP Program, the Pre-AP Bridge Program, the AP Summer Bridge Program for upperclassmen, and the AP Study Seminar.

In the spring of 2006, Wakefield was granted the Inspiration Award by the College Board, reflecting the inception of the AP Network, and naming Wakefield as one of the country's most improved high schools. Only three high schools are granted this honor every year. John Tyler High School of Tyler, Texas and Hobbs High School of Hobbs, New Mexico were also given this recognition in 2006.

==== Senior project ====
Wakefield is the only school in Arlington that requires students to complete a senior project as a requirement for graduation. As a junior, each student selects a topic of interest which must be approved. Students may begin research during the summer before senior year. However, all papers must be written and verified during the academic year. At the start of the seniors' academic year, students select a date in which they are to present the project, giving them a time frame in which papers are to be submitted. During the year, the student then decides on a panel (composed of one pre-determined faculty member, one expert in the field, one person from the community, and another fellow senior) who will grade the project. Those who do not receive a "pass" or higher will report to Summer Institute to complete the missing requirements.

=== Testing ===
Wakefield administers the SOL tests for the state of Virginia.

Average SOL scores
Subject	2003	2004	2005	2006	2007
Reading	93%	89%	81%	86%	95%
Writing	89%	84%	84%	83%	93%
Math	69%	72%	72%	75%	
Science				67%	

Wakefield offers the PSAT free to students in grades 10 and 11. An SAT preparatory course is offered, as well as the actual examination. In 2007 the school's average SAT score was a 959 (471 in Reading, 488 in Math).

=== Electives ===
==== Foreign languages ====
The Spanish Immersion program allows students to continue taking challenging courses involving the Spanish language. In the past, students have had part of the entire curriculum in Spanish. Currently, the high school level of Spanish Immersion allows students to develop their ability to read, speak, and think in courses including Spanish Literature and AP Spanish. Starting in 2006, immersion students are privileged to study abroad at universities in various Spanish speaking countries.

==== Visual arts ====
The school offers photography, art history, drawing, painting, ceramics, crafts, AP art, ceramics, AP Art History and crafts.

== Athletics ==
Wakefield's athletic department competes through the Virginia High School League. The Wakefield Athletic teams is administered by Nate Hailey. The teams wear the colors kelly green, white, and black.

=== Teams ===
Boys' athletics:
- Baseball
- Basketball
- Cheerleading
- Crew
- Cross country
- Football
- Golf
- Lacrosse
- Soccer
- Swim & dive
- Tennis
- Track and Field
- Wrestling
Girls' athletics:
- Basketball
- Cheerleading
- Crew
- Cross country
- Drill team
- Field hockey
- Gymnastics
- Lacrosse
- Soccer
- Softball
- Swim & dive
- Tennis
- Track and field
- Volleyball
Interscholastic:

Non-fine arts

- Forensics
- It's Academic
- JROTC
- Math Team
- Model U.N.
- VJAS

Fine arts

- Choral Music
- Drama Club
- Instrumental Music
- Marching Warriors

=== Pool and stadiums ===
Wakefield High School owns and manages its own swimming pool. During the week, it is used for physical education for the students of Wakefield and for students of neighboring middle and elementary schools. Other times, it is used publicly by the community at large. The community does not have a team to represent the public pool, but is represented by the Warriors' swim and dive team.

Starting in 2002, Arlington County spent over $700,000 on the implant and maintenance of a new synthetic turf field in various athletic fields and stadiums. In 2004, Wakefield's outdoor stadium was the first of the three Arlington high schools with this change. Washington-Liberty High School and Yorktown High School had their fields installed in 2005 and 2006, respectively.

In 2004, Wakefield completed the construction of the girls' softball field. This was the first time in the history of Wakefield Warrior athletics that the two sports, softball and baseball, were played on different fields. However, the fields were demolished in 2011, and the current school building now stands where the baseball and softball fields once were. The baseball field was then reconstructed in early 2015, where the old building was. The new baseball and softball fields were reconstructed during the rebuild of the new school.

Stadium upgrades were scheduled to begin in April 2013 and be completed by July. Stadium improvements were to include the replacement of bleachers on both sides and a new press box. The press box was to include heating, air conditioning, and filming platform for recording games. The stadium is also expected a concessions stand, to provide food and snacks during the game event. This project was completed in the spring of 2015.

== Notable visitors ==
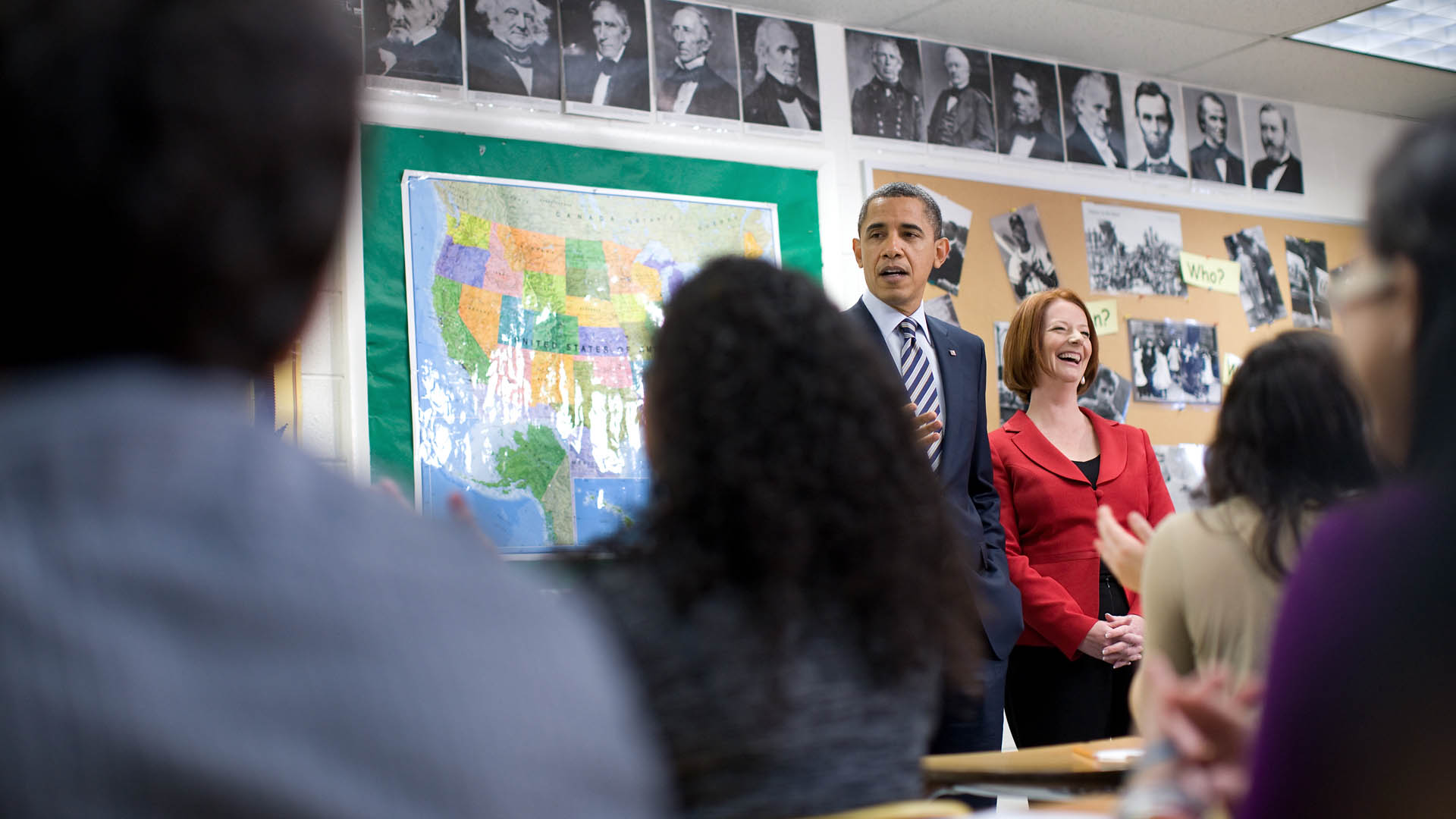
President Barack Obama and Prime Minister Julia Gillard at Wakefield High School in 2011

On the first day of the 2009-2010 school year, Wakefield hosted President Barack Obama, who addressed the students in his "Back to School Speech". This speech was broadcast live in schools across the United States. On March 7, 2011, President Obama revisited the school, this time with the Australian Prime Minister Julia Gillard and the United States Secretary of Education Arne Duncan. The president and prime minister talked to a class of juniors in an AP US History class.

== Notable alumni ==
- Hunter Doherty "Patch" Adams (1963) – medical doctor; inspiration behind the film Patch Adams
- David Michael "Dave" Bautista, Jr – professional wrestler, actor
- Jim Bregman – a member of the first American team to compete in judo in the Summer Olympics
- Dawn Chatty – American social anthropologist and academic
- Donna Floyd – former American amateur tennis player
- Nidal Hasan (attended freshman year) – perpetrator of the 2009 Fort Hood shooting
- Doug Mills - photographer
- Harun Iman – middle-distance runner, competitor at the 2006 USA Outdoor Track and Field Championships
- John C. Metzler Jr. - former Superintendent of Arlington National Cemetery
- Drew Powell – professional American football quarterback
- Mark Robinson – musician and founder of TeenBeat Records independent label
- Seth Shostak – American astronomer
- Ron Terwilliger – Chairman Emeritus and retired Chief Executive Officer of Trammell Crow Residential
