= Washington-Liberty High School =

Public high school in Arlington, Virginia

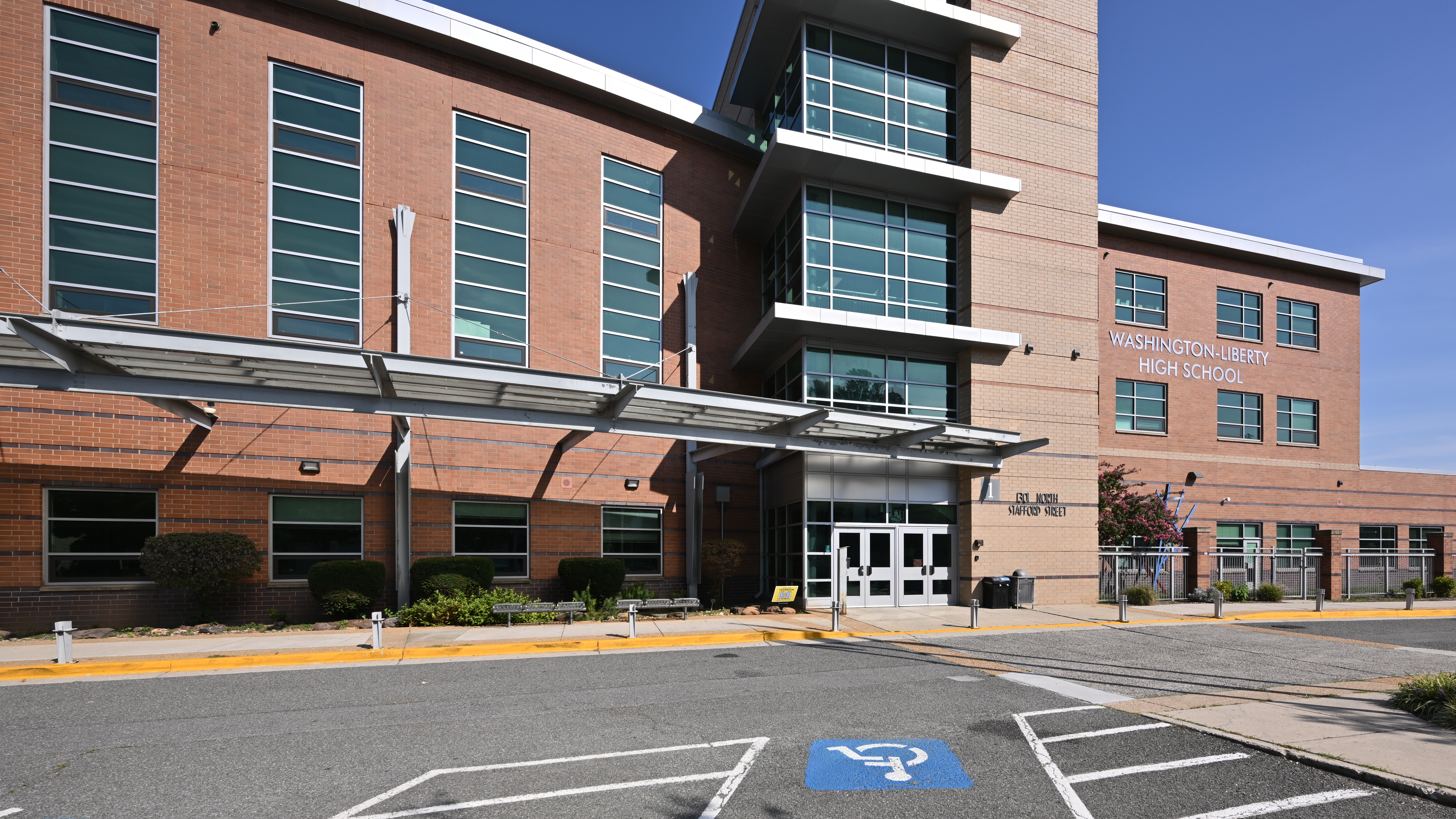

Location
- 1301 North Stafford Street; Arlington, Virginia 22201; United States
- 38°53′13″N 77°06′35″W

Information
- Former name: Washington-Lee High School (1925–2019)
- School type: Public, high school
- Founded: 1925; 101 years ago
- School district: Arlington Public Schools
- Principal: Alexander Duncan, III
- Teaching staff: 167.20 (FTE) (2023–24)
- Grades: 9–12
- Enrollment: 2,900 (2023–24)
- Student to teacher ratio: 17.34 (2023–24)
- Campus type: Urban
- Colors: Blue; Grey
- Athletics conference: National District; Northern Region
- Nickname: Generals
- Rivals: Wakefield Warriors; Yorktown Patriots
- Website: wl.apsva.us

Washington-Liberty High School, formerly known as Washington-Lee High School, is a public high school in the Arlington Public Schools district in Arlington, Virginia, covering grades 9–12. Its attendance area serves the central third of Arlington, and it also offers the International Baccalaureate program countywide.

== History ==
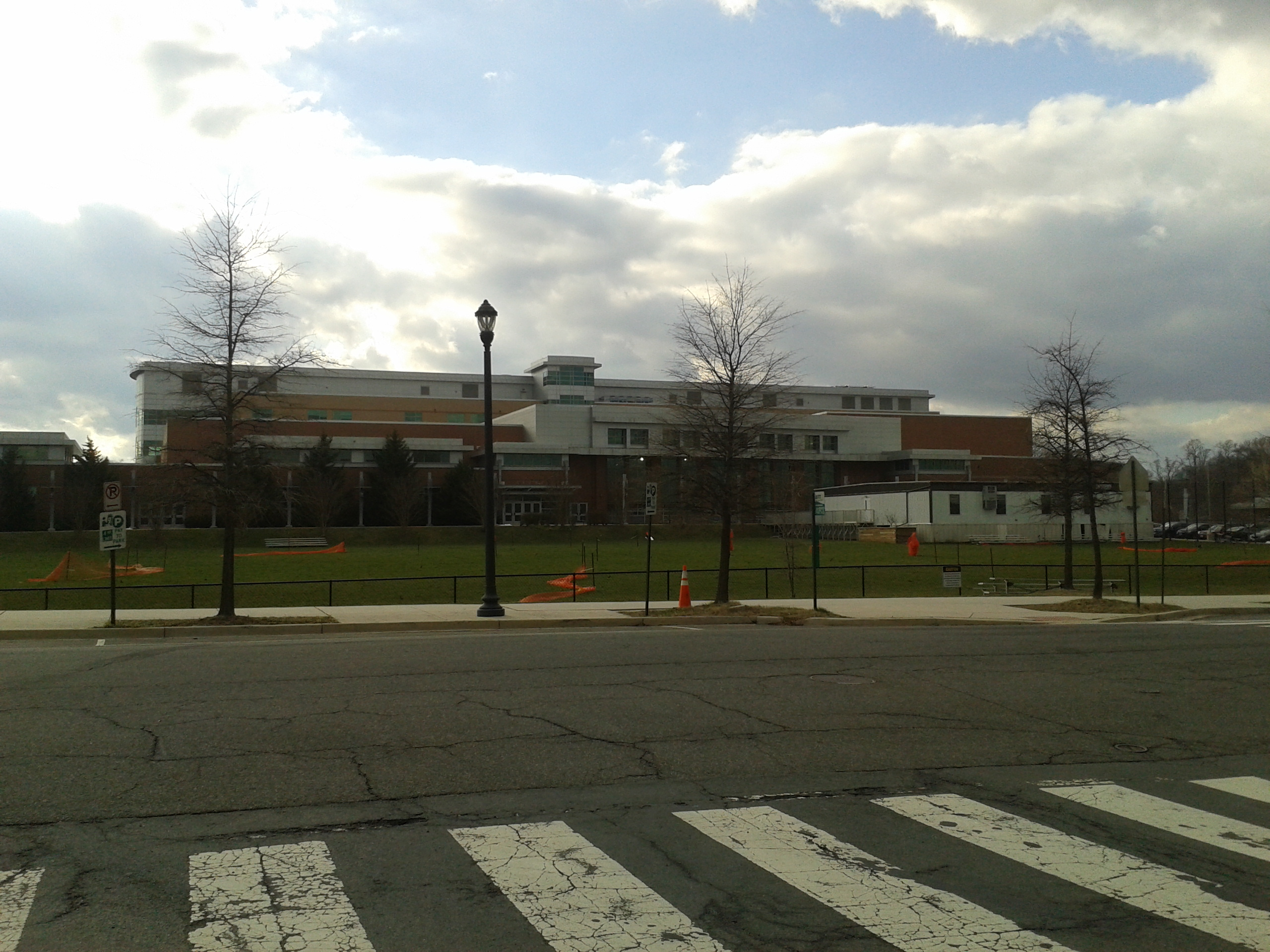
View of the high school from across Quincy Street (2017)

The former name of Washington-Liberty High School, Washington-Lee High School was taken from the Washington and Lee University, but the "and" was omitted and replaced with a hyphen to distinguish its name from the university's.

Construction on Washington-Lee began in 1924, with the school opening in 1925 and graduating its first class in 1927. The architectural firm Upman & Adams designed the building in a simplified version of the Colonial Revival style. The school fronted on 13th St. N, which separated the school from its athletic field, eventually dedicated as Arlington County's War Memorial Stadium. In 1932, 41 classrooms, new offices, and another gym were added to the original building. A new wing and a large library with Palladian windows and two reading rooms were built in 1942 with WPA funds. The rifle range was also constructed in the shop area. In 1951, noted architect Rhees Burkett designed an addition that fronted on N. Quincy Street in the International Style. Along with the new Stratford Junior High School, it helped usher in a wave of contemporary commercial and school architecture that defined much of Arlington until the 1980s.

In 1960, some sophomores and juniors were sent to form the core of the then new Yorktown High School, to relieve overcrowding resulting from the baby boomer generation reaching high school age.

In 1975, the school board made the controversial decision to demolish the original sections of the school and construct a new facility with an open space instructional environment. The new school opened in 1977, and a new auditorium was constructed a few years later. In 1984, with the introduction of a new "closed campus" policy for underclassmen, a cafeteria was constructed in the school's commons.

Beginning in 2006, the school underwent a complete reconstruction; none of the older buildings remain. The theater and nearby classrooms were demolished to allow for the construction of the new classroom building, which opened in January 2008. An axial orientation to War Memorial Stadium and the primary parking areas is the defining characteristic of the new school. A ten-lane regulation NCAA short course swimming pool (with optional 25 meter lanes), gym and other indoor athletic facilities, and an 800-seat auditorium opened to the public in July 2009. The demolition of the 1951 building and the construction of auxiliary athletic fields and additional landscaping was completed in December 2009. The renovation cost Arlington County nearly $100 million and making it one of the most expensive high school construction projects in the United States.

In the wake of the August 2017 Unite the Right rally protesting the removal of a statue of Robert E. Lee, the Arlington County School Board voted unanimously in June 2018 to rename Washington-Lee High School to remove Lee's name, sparking a community discussion on whether this was wanted. This included debates on the process in which the school board took to change the name of the school. In the months prior to the name change, an appointed committee considered several options before narrowing them to "Washington-Loving High School", in honor of the Loving v. Virginia court case, and "Washington-Liberty High School". On January 10, 2019, the school board voted unanimously for the latter name. The name change took effect with the 2019–2020 school year.

In 2018 the Arlington School Board voted to integrate the former Arlington Education Center building into the Washington-Liberty campus. The building was completely renovated at the cost of $38 million and opened for the 2022–2023 school year. The building was renamed the Washington-Liberty Annex building and functions as a regular part of the school, containing classrooms, administrative and counseling offices, student lounging areas and a weight room.

== Campus ==
The new four-story building frames the northern end of War Memorial Stadium, referencing the orientation of the original three story 1924 building. A stepped terrace leads to the field from the school's student commons and outdoor eating areas. The school's primary corridor on the ground floor is the focal point for the more public spaces, which include the performing arts center, student commons, alumni conference room, cyber cafe, and journalism suite. It spans the distance between the commons and a primary entrance with access to a multistory parking structure and bus lanes. A public entrance is located on N Stafford St, and a separate public entrance serves the pool.

The compact massing of the new building allowed for the construction of additional athletic fields on land previously occupied by the former school. The orientation of the new school within the surrounding open space and the abundant pedestrian connections across the site that connect neighborhoods adhere to Arlington County's urban design guidelines, which follow smart growth planning principles. The new building was certified LEED gold by the U.S. Green Building Council (USGBC) rating system, the second high school in Virginia to achieve that benchmark.

On the east side of the building near the indoor pool but not directly attached to the main building is the so-called annex which became a part of Washington-Liberties campus in 2022 after three years of renovations.

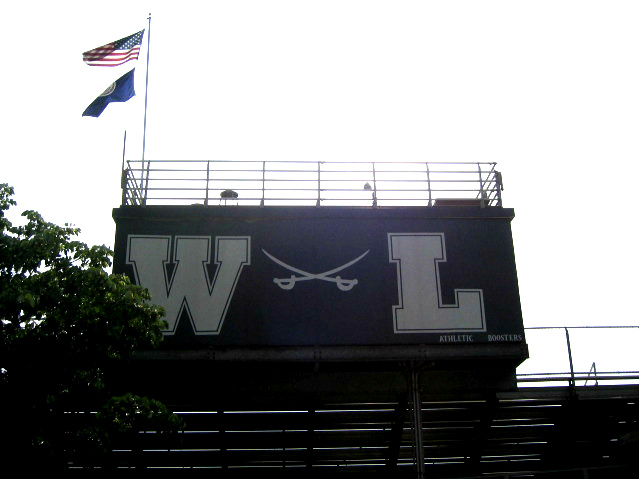
Crossed sabres logo above the bleachers at Washington-Liberty, 2011

== Academics ==
In 1985, Washington-Liberty was named a National Blue Ribbon School of Excellence by the US Department of Education. In 2007, Newsweek magazine ranked Washington-Liberty 33rd among the nation's top high schools.

As of 2024, Washington-Liberty is the only school in Arlington that offers both the Advanced Placement program and the International Baccalaureate program. The vast majority of its students take advantage of these advanced courses or diploma programs.

== Fine arts ==
The school offers fine arts courses and electives. Within the music department, electives include the marching and symphonic bands, madrigals, women's chorale, choir, orchestra, music theory, and guitar. In 2007, the music department received the Blue Ribbon Award, the highest award given by the Virginia Music Educators Association. The school was also a blue ribbon school for 2010–11.

The Washington Liberty Theatre Department participated in the 2024 Brandon Victor Dixon Awards. Their production of Sweeney Todd: The Demon Barber of Fleet Street was nominated for best musical, with actor Jack Potter, in the role of Adolpho Pirelli being nominated for Best Actor, Celeste Collins in the role of Ms. Lovett being a finalist for Best Actress, and Erika Sjetnan-Day being nominated in props for the technical theatre award.

WL Theatre teacher and director Danny Issa was featured on NPR talking about WL's 2023 production of Almost, Maine by John Cariani.

== Demographics ==
The gender breakdown of the 2,900 students enrolled in 2023–2024 was:

- Male – 50.72%
- Female – 49.28%

The ethnic breakdown of those same 2,900 students was:

- Native American/Alaskan Native – 0.17%
- Asian – 9.17%
- Black – 8.21%
- Hispanic – 34.41%
- Native Hawaiian/Pacific Islander – 0.03%
- White – 40%
- Multiracial – 8%

The number of students were eligible for free or reduced-price lunch in 2023–2024 was 25.93%.

== Test scores ==
Washington-Liberty High School is a fully accredited with the Southern Association of Colleges and Schools. W-L's average SAT score in 2016 was a 1703 (575 in Reading; 576 in Math; 552 in Writing).

As of 2011, Washington-Liberty High School met or exceeded the Virginia average passing rate for the majority of Virginia Standards of Learning exam categories

== Notable alumni ==
- Eric G. Adelberger, physicist and winner of the 2021 Breakthrough Prize in Fundamental Physics, 1956
- Warren Beatty, actor and Academy Award-winning director, 1955
- Brian Blados, nine-year NFL player, first-round draft choice and Pro Bowler for the Cincinnati Bengals, 1980
- Sandra Bullock, Academy Award-winning actress, 1982
- George Lee Butler, Commander in Chief, USSC, 1957
- Betty Jane Diener, Virginia Secretary of Commerce (1982–1986), 1958
- Nancy Dussault, actress and Broadway singer and dancer, ABC's Good Morning America co-anchor, 1953
- Mohamed Hadid, real estate developer
- Reggie Harrison retired NFL player on Pittsburgh Steelers Super Bowl winning teams IX and X
- John T. "Til" Hazel, attorney, developer, 1954
- John Hummer, retired NBA player, entrepreneur
- Concha Jerez, Spanish artist, 1959
- Tony Johnson, Olympic Teams, rowing. Head Coach, Yale, and Georgetown University Crews, 1958
- Clay Kirby, former Major League Baseball pitcher, 1966
- Shirley MacLaine, Academy Award-winning actress, 1952
- Shelley Mann, Olympic Gold-Medal swimmer, women's 100-meter butterfly, 1956 Melbourne Olympics, 1955
- George McQuinn, 12-year MLB first baseman, 1928
- Lucas Mendes, soccer player, 2016
- Brittany O'Grady, actress, 2013
- Pat Priest, actress on The Munsters, 1954
- Gail Renshaw, 1969 Miss USA World, 1965
- Robert Richardson, Nobel Prize-winning physicist, 1955
- Jake Scott, two-time Super Bowl champion w/ Miami Dolphins: Super Bowl VII and VIII, 1963
- Eric Sievers, 10-year NFL player, 1981–90, 1976
- Scott Sowers, actor, 1982
- Owsley "Bear" Stanley, Grateful Dead sound engineer and clandestine chemist, admitted to University of Virginia without graduating from high school, c.1952
- Carl Tanner, opera tenor, 1980
- Forrest Tucker, actor, 1938
- Ron Weber, former radio announcer for NHL's Washington Capitals
- Stan Winston, film director, visual effects supervisor, 1964
