= Arlington Outdoor Lab =

Coordinates: 38.804920°N 77.720841°W

The Phoebe Hall Knipling Outdoor Laboratory (usually called "the Arlington Outdoor Lab" or simply "Outdoor Lab") is a 225-acre (0.91 km^{2}) outdoor facility located in Fauquier County, Virginia. It is owned and operated by Arlington Outdoor Education Association, Inc. with funding from Arlington Public Schools with the aim of teaching urban students in Arlington County, Virginia science, outdoor skills, arts, and humanities in a natural setting. Its mascot is a spotted salamander.

== Facility ==
The Lab features a large pond, two small mountains, streams, a meadow, and forested areas. There is a main building for administration and meals, a classroom building for displaying local wildlife and teaching, bathroom facilities with running water, and an observatory for stargazing. There are also several wooden tent platforms and well established trails with bridges over streams. In 2010, the classroom building qualified for LEED Silver status.

== Usage ==
The Lab hosts four classes of Arlington County students a week, amounting to over 9,000 students a year. Activities vary by grade. Third graders will set up pulley mechanisms to hoist their classmates to study simple machines while seventh graders will collect specimens and test water quality in the Lab's streams. Fifth graders traditionally stay overnight at the lab in tents they erect themselves between hiking and lessons on ecology and biology utilizing local flora and fauna.

During the summer, the Lab hosts three week long summer camps. Throughout the year, the Lab will periodically host open houses where Arlington students and families can drive out and enjoy the amenities of the lab (fishing, canoeing, hiking, etc.) free of charge. The Lab also provides Eagle Scout projects for Arlington Boy Scouts.

== Funding ==
The Outdoor Lab is owned and operated by Arlington Outdoor Education Association, Inc. (AOEA), a public charity formed in 1967 for the purpose of maintaining the lab. Arlington Public Schools directly funds costs related to educational programs and the full-time staff are APS employees.

== History ==
=== Civil War ===
The most significant activity was in June 1863 when Confederate General JEB Stuart led 4,200 troops through Glasscock Gap, which is on the Lab property, en route to Gettysburg. Stuart ultimately ended up arriving on the second day of the battle, too late to affect the Union victory. Evidence of the Civil War activity has been seen through artifacts found on the Lab property including: bullets, Union belt buckle, Confederate buttons and various other metal objects.

=== Outdoor Lab Creation ===
The Arlington Outdoor Lab was founded in 1967.
