= Til Hazel =

American businessman (1930–2022)

John Tilghman "Til" Hazel Jr. (October 29, 1930 – March 15, 2022) was an American attorney and real-estate developer in Northern Virginia who is credited with developing several portions of Fairfax County, Virginia, into major commercial and residential areas from the 1960s through the present. He was instrumental in the large-scale development of Tysons, Virginia (previously known as Tysons Corner), which became one of the country's first significant edge cities.

In the 1960s and 1970s, as Fairfax County was rapidly transformed from a largely rural area to one suburban, Hazel became the public face and fulcrum on which the pro-development forces rested. In 1983, a Washington Post article offered up this characterization: "[Hazel] emerged as its [Fairfax County] most controversial figure as a judge, lieutenant in the Byrd organization, community booster, preeminent zoning lawyer and developer, and eventually, as near to the political kingmaker as Northern Virginia's diffuse power structure allows."

Author Joel Garreau posits in his seminal book Edge City: Life on the New Frontier that Hazel "has done more to shape the Washington area than any man since Pierre L'Enfant."

== Early years ==
John T. "Til" Hazel Jr. was born at Georgetown Hospital in the city of Washington, D.C. His father, John T. Hazel, was a prominent Arlington, Virginia surgeon who also owned a farm in then-rural McLean, Virginia; his mother, Ruth Douglas Hazel, was a homemaker. Hazel attended and graduated from Arlington's Washington-Lee High School. Presented with the option of either attending Iowa State University to study agriculture or enrolling at Harvard University, Hazel chose Harvard, where he studied American history and graduated cum laude in 1951. He went on to study at Harvard Law School, receiving his Juris Doctor in 1954. Hazel then joined the U.S. Army's Judge Advocate General's Corps office and served until 1957. Following his honorable discharge, he turned to practicing law in the private sector, joining the Arlington County office of Jesse, Phillips, Klinge, and Kendrick, where he practiced property law, specializing in real estate.

At Jesse Phillips, Hazel was tasked with condemning and acquiring land for the future Capital Beltway. It was this experience that led to Hazel's knowledge of zoning, land acquisition, and eminent domain.

== Advocate of development ==
In the late 1940s after the end of World War II, Fairfax County was still a sparsely populated rural tract, but one poised to boom as a suburb of Washington, D.C. It was ideally positioned, located roughly 15 miles from D.C.'s core business district. Arlington County, Virginia, situated directly across from Washington between the eastern border of Fairfax County and the Potomac River, already had seen substantial development during the war years, and its growth was showing no signs of slackening as the 1940s came to an end. It was the residential low cost tract-housing development of Pimmit Hills in eastern Fairfax County near his father's old farm in McLean, Virginia, that caught Hazel's eye. It was 1950, and though he was off at college, he sensed the potential for new development in Northern Virginia and the makings of a career in real estate.

Beginning in the late 1950s, Hazel, who was by then a seasoned land-use attorney at the law firm of Jesse Phillips, positioned himself as a tireless advocate for commercial and residential growth in Fairfax County. He quickly became the go-to guy for developers who wished to open up Fairfax to new housing and commercial development. Hazel pursued rezoning applications and changes to the county's comprehensive plan with great energy. There was an understanding that with the right “donations”, most zoning change applications would be approved.

Once these changes were approved, he then pushed for the timely installation of sewers and other utilities in accordance with the comprehensive plan, which primed the targeted areas for development. If the county board was slow or hesitant to take action on a particular rezoning application or land-use measure, Hazel was quick to turn to the courts. He petitioned often and was almost always successful, as the Virginia courts affirmed the state's reputation time and again as being more receptive to the rights of landowners than not. In Edge City, Garreau notes that "[Hazel] was a buzz saw. During his heyday, he never lost a zoning case in the Virginia Supreme Court."

=== Tysons ===
In the vicinity of Tysons, Virginia, which in the 1940s was a small farming community called Tysons Corner at the crossroads of Route 7 and Route 123 in Fairfax County, Hazel saw the potential for large-scale development. The future Capital Beltway, a project envisioned since the early 1950s, and for which Hazel had been involved acquiring land for, was finally under construction as the 1950s came to a close. Planned to encircle the District of Columbia roughly 10 miles out, the road would pass near Tysons Corner. Working closely with developer Gerald T. Halpin, who had purchased more than 100 acres in Tysons in 1962, Hazel was able to get the land rezoned for mid- and high-rise commercial development.

The first buildings in Tysons went up soon afterward, mainly catering to defense and national security contractors involved in providing services to the Pentagon, located in neighboring Arlington, and to the Central Intelligence Agency, which had relocated in 1961 to the Langley area of nearby McLean. Other businesses soon followed their lead.

In the early and mid-1960s, Hazel helped steer a development company helmed by Isadore Guldesky, Theodore Lerner, and H. Max Ammerman through a legal maze of ordinances and regulations to construct Tysons Corner Center, at the time one of the first super-regional enclosed malls in the country. After a controversial Fairfax County Board vote in favor of the Guldesky-Lerner-Ammerman group and, later, a lawsuit concerning a lease and zoning issue, the highly anticipated Tysons Corner Center was opened in 1968.

Hazel was instrumental in garnering the rezoning needed for Lerner's 117-acre Tysons II mixed-use development, considered by some the key in the urbanization of Tysons Corner. The project, which has opened in stages starting in 1988, currently contains the upscale, tri-level Tysons Galleria mall, a Ritz-Carlton hotel, and three high-rise office buildings. Other high-rise buildings are either under construction or are planned.

== Developer ==
In 1971, Hazel became a developer himself, forming a partnership with Northern Virginia-based developer Milton V. Peterson. The resulting Hazel/Peterson Companies went on to build some of the largest residential developments in Fairfax County, including, among others, Burke Centre, Franklin Farm, Fairfax Station, and Fair Lakes. The company also developed the Tysons-Mclean Office Park in McLean. In 1990, the partnership ended its run and was amicably split.

Hazel estimated in 1987 that he was directly responsible for creating housing for 60,000 of Fairfax County's then 600,000 residents. He owned or controlled, at one time or another, thousands of acres of land in Northern Virginia. In 1978, Hazel was quoted that he and Peterson owned "several hundred acres" of undeveloped land that might benefit from a proposed cross-county arterial road. It was reported in 1984 that Hazel had amassed 620 acres in the western Fairfax County. In his latter years, Hazel owned and lived on a more than 4000-acre working farm in Fauquier County, Virginia.

Working often in concert with Hazel was his brother, William A. Hazel, who owned and operated Chantilly, Virginia-based William A Hazel, Inc., a company which evolved to become one of the Washington area's largest construction firms. At its zenith, the business was depicted as an "earthmoving empire of twelve hundred employees" with "more heavy equipment than many African nations." William A. Hazel died in 2012 at the age of 77.

In 1988, Hazel teamed up with the Edward J. DeBartolo Corporation in an attempt to build a regional shopping center next to the Manassas National Battlefield Park, but the project faced strong opposition and was eventually scrapped. The family-owned Hazel Land Companies, Inc., established in 1971, remains active, pursuing residential, commercial, and retail development opportunities throughout the D.C. metropolitan region.

== Legal career ==
After receiving his J.D. from Harvard Law School in 1954, Hazel found employment with the Judge Advocate General's Corps of the United States Army. He worked for the Judge Advocate for three years, leaving in 1957 to join the Northern Virginia law firm of Jesse, Phillips, Klinge, and Kendrick. Hazel was a general practicing attorney at Jesse Phillips, but soon honed a specialty in real estate and zoning law.

In 1961, Hazel became a general district court judge in Fairfax County, and served in that capacity until 1963. He then returned to private practice, forming in 1963 his own law firm Hazel, Beckhorn & Hanes. Headquartered in Fairfax County, the firm specialized in all aspects of real estate law. By 1987, Hazel, Beckhorn & Hanes had grown to 65 lawyers. In that same year, the firm merged with Thomas & Fiske, an Alexandria, Virginia-based firm. The resulting entity, Hazel, Thomas, Fiske, Beckhorn & Hanes comprised 118 lawyers.

In 1990, the firm shortened its name to Hazel & Thomas PC., which merged with Pittsburgh-based Reed Smith Shaw & McClay, LLP in 1999. For a period of time, the combined firm was called Reed Smith Hazel & Thomas, but was officially changed to Reed Smith in 2002. Hazel was a senior partner in Reed Smith Hazel and Thomas, and later Reed Smith. By 2016, however, he was no longer associated with the firm.

== Other endeavors ==
Hazel was a significant supporter of George Mason University going back to the institution's early years in the late 1950s as the Northern Virginia branch of the University of Virginia. Along with other community leaders, he helped acquire the land for school's main campus in Fairfax County. Appointed to the university's first Board of Visitors, he served in that capacity from 1972 to 1983, and later as the BOV's rector from 1976 to 1978 and 1982–83. Hazel also was a leader in the formation of the George Mason University Foundation in 1966. He served on the Foundation's Board of Trustees for 32 years, including six as chair.

Of particular interest to Hazel was the establishment of the George Mason University School of Law in 1979 (now known as the Antonin Scalia Law School). Despite considerable opposition in the state of Virginia, Hazel and others eventually prevailed in acquiring a law school for George Mason. He personally presented the accreditation case to the American Bar Association to establish the program. In 2005, the George Mason Arlington Campus building that houses the Scalia Law School was named John T. Hazel Jr. Hall.

Hazel was a founder of the Virginia Business Higher Education Council, an organization promoting cooperation between industry and universities in Virginia. He was Chairman Emeritus of Flint Hill School in Oakton, Virginia, where the Lower School building is named for him, and a former member of the Board of the Smithsonian's National Air and Space Museum. Hazel also served as chairman and vice chairman of the Corcoran Gallery of Art Board of Trustees in Washington, D.C.

== Death ==
Hazel died March 15, 2022, aged 91. He was twice widowed; his second wife, Anne Merrill Barnett, preceded him in death by three months. His first wife, Marion (Engle), died in 1995.
