= American Journal of Applied Sciences =

- Discipline: Multidisciplinary academic
- Language: English

Publication details
- History: 2004–present
- Publisher: Science Publications
- Frequency: Monthly
- Open access: Yes

Standard abbreviations
- ISO 4: Am. J. Appl. Sci.

Indexing
- ISSN: 1546-9239 (print); 1554-3641 (web)

Links
- Journal homepage

The American Journal of Applied Sciences is a monthly peer-reviewed open access academic journal publishing original research articles in the fields of chemistry, business and economics, physics, geology, engineering, mathematics, statistics, and computer science. The journal was established in 2004 and is published by Science Publications, a publisher listed on Beall's List before it closed down in 2017.

The journal was abstracted and indexed in Scopus and Inspec. Scopus discontinued its coverage in 2016.
