= Arlington Public Schools =

School division in Arlington County, Virginia

Address
- 2110 Washington Blvd Arlington, Virginia, 22204; United States

District information
- Type: Public, school division
- Grades: PK-12
- Established: December 6, 1864; 161 years ago
- Superintendent: Francisco Durán
- School board: Reid Goldstein, Chair; Cristina Diaz-Torres, Vice Chair; David Priddy, Mary Kadera, Bethany Sutton
- Schools: 45
- Enrollment: 28,020 (2019)

Other information
- Website: www.apsva.us

Arlington Public Schools is a public school division in Arlington County, Virginia. In 2019, student enrollment was 28,020 students, with students coming from more than 146 countries. In 2015, there were 2,166 teachers. There are 24 elementary schools, 6 middle schools, 4 high schools, 1 secondary institution and 4 other educational programs within the school district.

Forbes magazine named the Washington, D.C., and Arlington area as the top place in the nation to educate one's child in 2007.

In fiscal year 2019, close to $637.1 million was budgeted for the school district.

== History ==
The first public schools in Arlington County, Virginia (then known as Alexandria County) were established in 1870: the Columbia and Walker schools, which were for whites only, and the Arlington School for Negroes in Freedman's Village, which was located on land seized from Robert E. Lee's plantation. In 1932, Hoffman-Boston Junior High School, opened, allowing black students to pursue education past primary school in Arlington for the first time. However, since Hoffman-Boston was not accredited until the 1950s, many black Arlingtonians commuted to Washington, D.C. to pursue secondary education. In 1947, the NAACP sued the Arlington School Board for not providing equal educational facilities to black students in Constance Carter v. The School Board of Arlington County, Virginia. In 1950, the courts ruled in the NAACP's favor. As a result, increased funding was earmarked to the segregated schools for black students and black teachers began receiving equal pay.

In 1949, after advocacy from a local citizen's group, Arlingtonians for a Better County, Arlington's school board became the first in Virginia to be democratically elected rather than appointed.

In 1954, after the Brown v. Board of Education ruling, all public schools in the United States were required to desegregate. The political leaders of Virginia and the Virginia General Assembly, led by United States Senator Harry F. Byrd, adopted a policy of "massive resistance" to desegregation. Under massive resistance, schools that desegregated would be closed and students would be given money to attend private schools until the schools could be resegregated. Ten days after the Brown ruling, the Arlington County School board began a committee to research how to comply with the ruling. In January 1956, a plan to gradually desegregate Arlington's public schools was released by the committee. Less than a month later, the Virginia General Assembly voted to remove Arlington of its democratically elected school board, which the more conservative Arlington County Board replaced with officials more sympathetic to segregation. The integration plan was overturned by the new school board. That same year, the NAACP, on behalf of black and white students and their families, sued the new school board in an attempt to compel them to integrate in Clarissa Thompson v. the County School Board of Arlington, which was filed concurrently with other integration lawsuits around Virginia.

Many white racial moderates feared that the Board would close public schools rather than allow them to be desegregated. On May 1, 1958, the Arlington Committee to Preserve Public Schools, an all-white group which was neutral on segregation, and dedicated to preventing the closure of public schools, was formed.

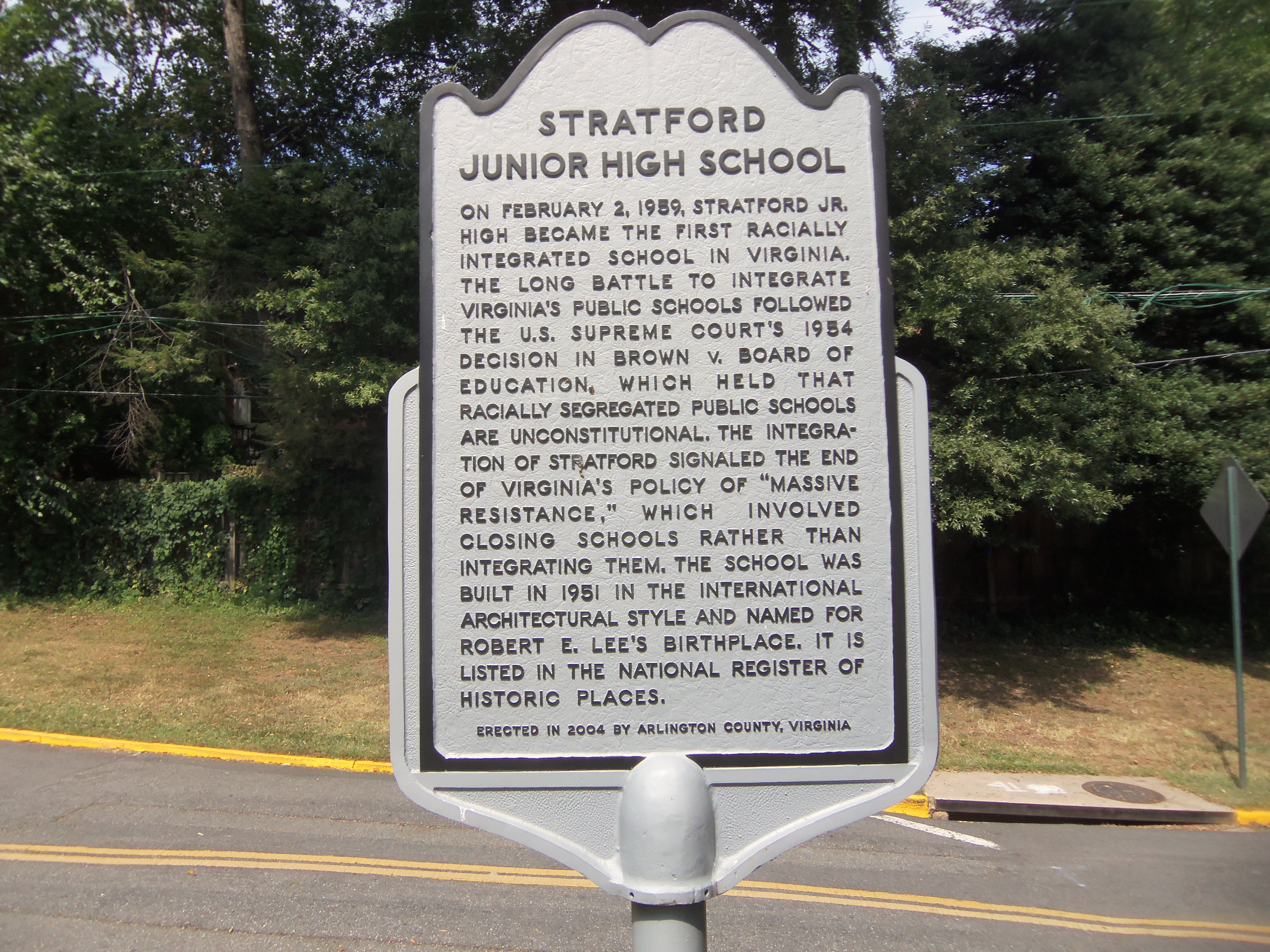
Historical marker at the site of Stratford Junior High School, now the site of Dorothy Hamm Middle School.

On January 19, 1959, the Supreme Court of Virginia effectively ended massive resistance by ruling in James v. Almond that public school closures in violated of the Constitution of Virginia. On January 22, the Arlington County School Board announced that Stratford Junior High would be the first school to be desegregated. On February 2, four black students- Ronald Deskins, Michael Jones, Gloria Thompson and Lance Newman- arrived at Stratford, protected by nearly 100 police officers, hoping to avoid what had happened to the Little Rock Nine. The desegregation of Stratford, the first public school in Virginia to be desegregated, ultimately passed without incident, and an Anti-Defamation League newsletter declared it "The Day Nothing Happened". With this, Arlington County became the first school system in Virginia to desegregate.

Arlington's public schools gradually continued to integrate, although courts only approved of its pupil placement system as being racially neutral in 1971, twelve years after desegregation began. School dances and athletic events were ended in 1959 by the Arlington County School Board after integration began. Athletic events were reinstated in 1961, but school dances were held privately for years afterwards. Hoffman-Boston Junior-Senior High School closed in 1964 and its students were placed in formerly all-white schools. By 1969, all Arlington high schools were desegregated. The only two schools to remain almost completely segregated were Drew Elementary School and Hoffman-Boston Elementary School. In the case John E. Hart et al. v. County School Board of Arlington County, Virginia, parents of Drew Elementary School students sued the Arlington County School Board for further integration. The School Board announced a plan, which the courts approved of, to bus Drew and Hoffman-Boston Elementary School students to other elementary schools around Arlington.

Arlington's school board was eventually allowed to be democratically elected again, rather than be appointed by the Arlington County Board.

In the wake of the August 2017 Charlottesville, Virginia, deadly white supremacist rally protesting the removal of a statue of Robert E. Lee, the Arlington County School Board voted unanimously in June 2018 to rename Washington-Lee High School to remove Lee's name, sparking outrage among some in the community. In the months prior to the name change, the Arlington County school board narrowed several options to "Washington-Loving High School", their top choice in honor of the Loving v. Virginia court case, and "Washington-Liberty High School". On January 10, 2019, the school board voted unanimously for the latter name. The name change took effect later that same year.

In 2019, Arlington Public Schools celebrated the 60th anniversary of desegregation in Arlington.

== Students ==
In 2019, there was a total student enrollment of 28,020 students, with students coming from more than 146 countries and speaking 107 different languages. Arlington Public Schools has a 95% graduation rate.

In 2009, the student body was 48% white, 26% Latino, 13% black and 11% Asian.

In 2019, the student body was 46% white, 28% Hispanic, 10% black and 9% Asian, with American Indian, Alaskan Native, Native Hawaiian, Pacific Islander, and Multiple backgrounds comprising the remaining 7%.

== Teachers ==
As of 2019, teachers are paid an average salary of $74,554 per year.

In 2009, there were 2,166 teachers, of which 78% were white, 10% were black, 8% were Hispanic and 3% were Asian.

== Arlington County School Board ==
- Reid Goldstein, Chair
- Cristina Diaz-Torres, Vice Chair
- Mary Kadera, Member
- Bethany Sutton, Member
- David Priddy, Member

== Arlington County School Board Staff ==
- Melanie Elliott, Clerk of the School Board
- Claudia Mercado, Deputy Clerk and Communications Liaison
- Julieanne Jones, Administrative Assistant
- John Mickevice, Internal Auditor Director

== Special facilities ==
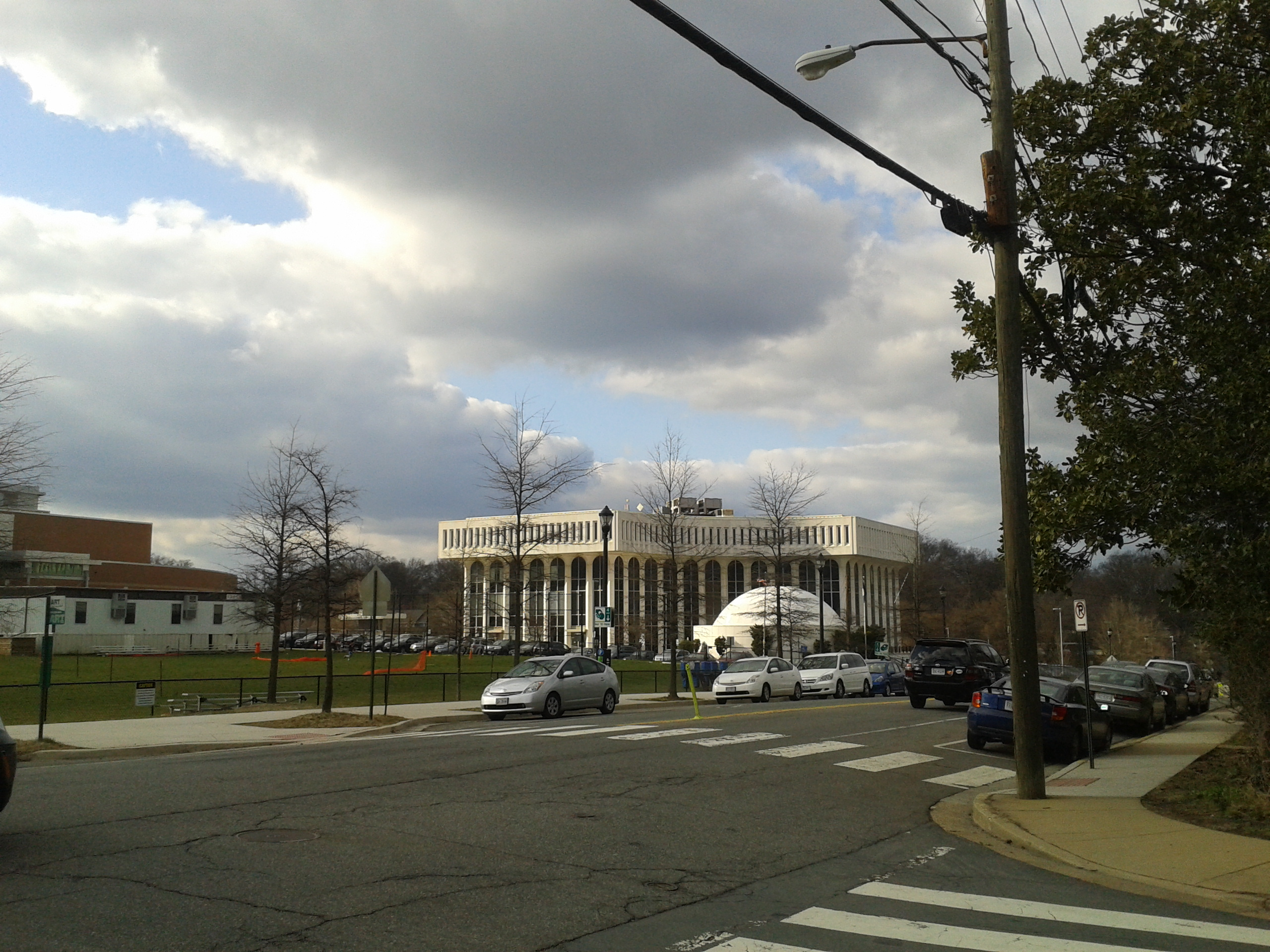
David M. Brown Planetarium in 2017

The David M. Brown Planetarium is operated by Arlington Schools Planetarium for both Arlington school field trips and public multimedia programs. It offers shows for the general public Fridays, Saturdays, and Sundays during the school year. The planetarium is named for astronaut David M. Brown, a graduate of Arlington's Yorktown High School who was killed in the Space Shuttle Columbia disaster in 2003.

The Arlington Outdoor Lab is a 225-acre outdoor facility operated by Arlington Schools and located in Fauquier County. In addition to a large classroom building, the lab facility has a pond, streams, small mountains, and forested areas.

== Schools ==
=== High schools ===
- Wakefield High School
- Washington-Liberty High School
- Yorktown High School
- Arlington Tech

=== Middle schools ===
==== Dorothy Hamm Middle School ====
Dorothy Hamm Middle School is located at 4100 Vacation Lane. The principal is Ellen Smith. The school is named after civil rights activist Dorothy Hamm. From 1951 to 1978, this building was the location of Stratford Junior High School. From 1978 to 2019, the H-B Woodlawn Secondary Program was located here, along with the former Stratford Program (now the Eunice Kennedy Shriver Program). Dorothy Hamm was first opened for the 2019–2020 school year. Students graduating Dorothy Hamm will either attend Washington-Liberty or Yorktown High Schools.

Dorothy Hamm's mascot is the Phoenix. Their colors are red, gold, and white.

==== Gunston Middle School ====
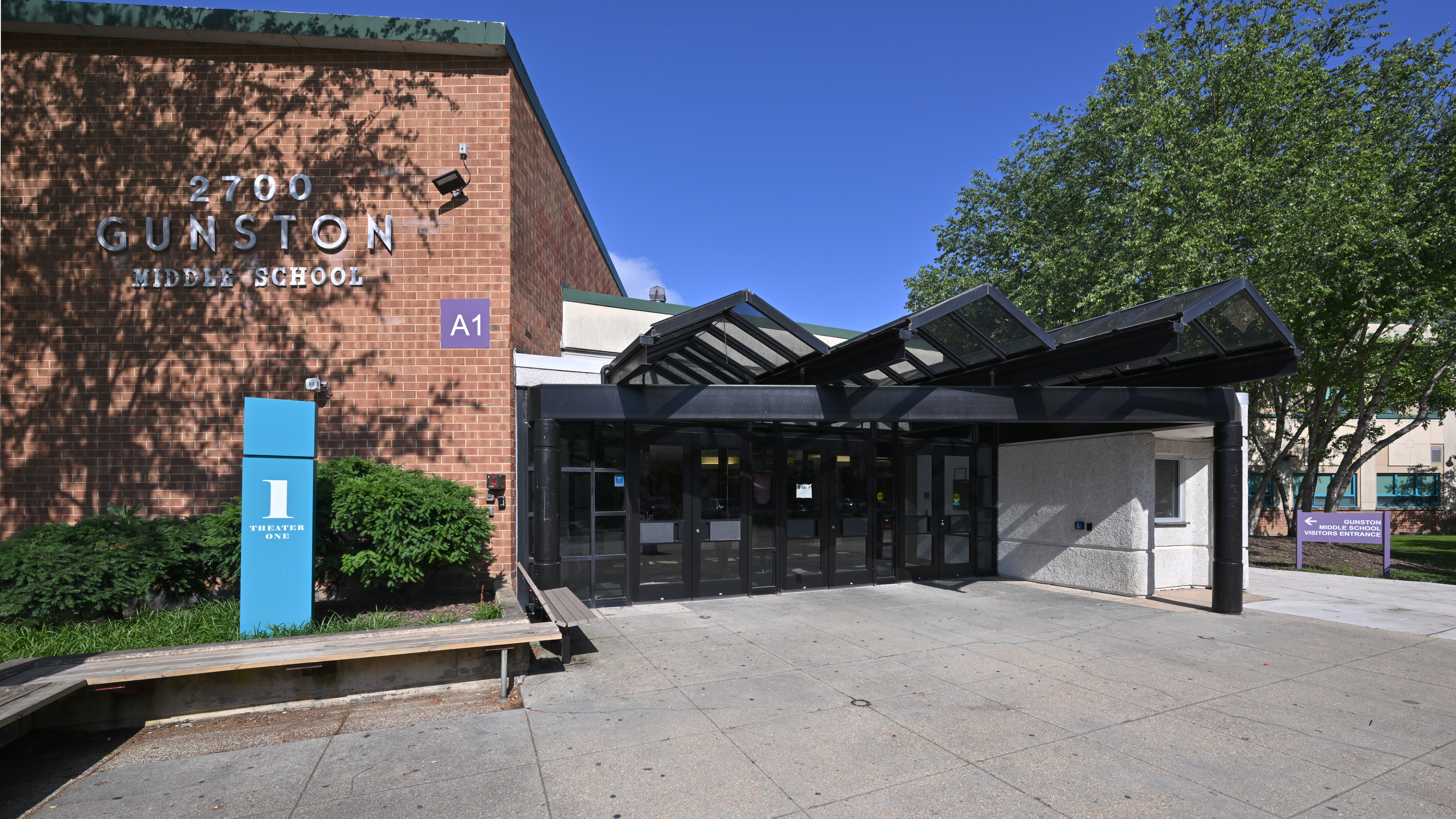
Gunston Middle School main entrance, Arlington, VA

Gunston Middle School is located at 2700 South Lang Street, in Arlington Ridge. The principal is Carolyn Ruth Jackson. In 2012–13, there were over 800 students enrolled and more than 80 teachers (41 of whom have their Master's Degree). It is accredited through the Southern Association of Colleges and Schools. The school was originally called Brandon Junior High. In 1957 the school was renamed Gunston Junior High, named after Gunston Hall, the home of George Mason, the estate is nearby in Fairfax County, Virginia.

Gunston's mascot is the Hornet. The school colors are purple and teal. Sports teams include basketball, soccer, wrestling, swimming, track, tennis, cheerleading and ultimate frisbee.

Gunston's curriculum includes the continuation program for students who attended the Key Elementary or the Claremont Elementary Spanish Immersion program. Students in this program take three classes each day taught entirely in Spanish: Science, Social Studies and Spanish Language Arts. About 1/3 of the incoming 6th graders come from the Key or Claremont programs. Gunston also offers the Montessori Middle School program. Most students attending Gunston will attend Wakefield High School after graduating from 8th grade. Except for those students in the other programs who are not in the Wakefield district or immersion program.

The school, at the time, called Gunston Junior High School and encompassing grades 7, 8, and 9, closed in 1978 after a major decline in enrollments. At the time of its closure, the school mascot was the Falcon, and the school colors were black and gold. Gunston reopened in 1994 to address overcrowding in other area schools. After the re-opening in 1994, it subsequently went through a 3-phase major renovation, funded by the 2000 bond package. Construction was completed in 2003. It was built as a two-story building with a public recreation center and public auditorium.

Demographics
Ethnicity	2018
American Indian/Alaska Native	n/a
Asian/Pacific Islander	07.9%
Black	25.1%
Hispanic	43.8%
White	22.5%
Unspecified	n/a
ESL Students	112

State Testing
Average % Passing (school vs. state)
Grade 6
Subject	2006	
Reading	76%	83%
Mathematics	21%	51%
Grade 7
Subject	2006	
Reading	76%	81%
Mathematics	27%	44%
Grade 8
Subject	2006	
Reading	66%	72%
Writing	89%	87%
Mathematics	68%	76%
Science	76%	87%

Source: Virginia Department of Education

==== Kenmore Middle School ====
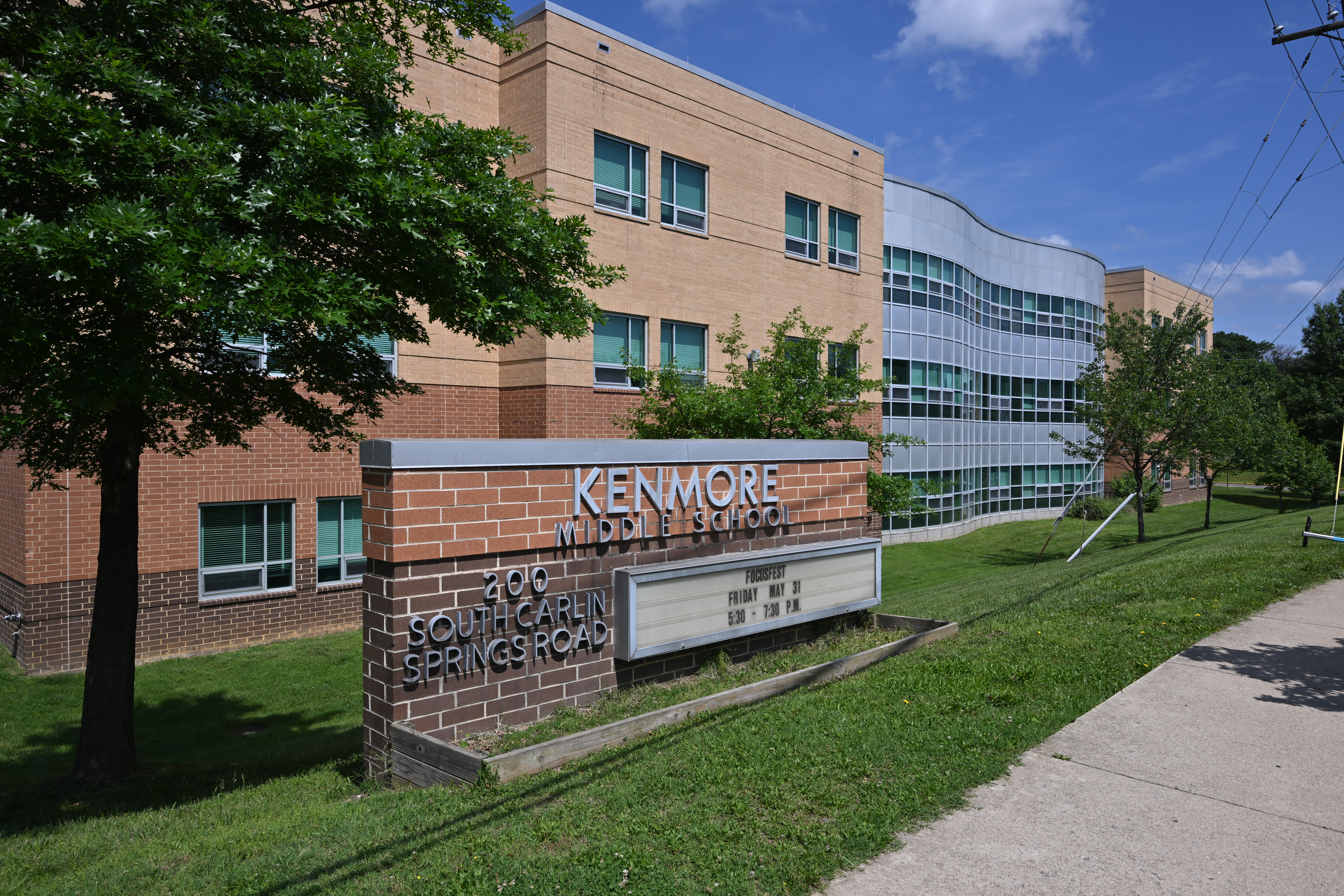
Kenmore Middle School sign, Arlington, VA

Kenmore Middle School is located at 200 South Carlin Springs Road, in Glencarlyn. The principal is David McBride. In 2006–2007, there were 723 students enrolled and over 79 teachers (51 of which have their Master's Degree). It is accredited through the Southern Association of Colleges and Schools. Kenmore is an arts and communications technology focus school.

Kenmore's mascot is the Cougars. The school colors are green and gold.

Kenmore's building was completed for the 2005–2006 school year. The building contains a larger auditorium, cafeteria, art studio, and library/media center. It is multi-storied, unlike the previous building. The previous building as an elementary school and later was a middle school. Most kids attending Kenmore will later on go to Wakefield or Washington-Liberty High School but in some cases will go to Yorktown.

Demographics
Ethnicity	2018
American Indian/Alaskan Native	n/a
Asian/Pacific Islander	9.9%
Black	10.4%
Hispanic	52.8%
White	26.9%
Unspecified	n/a
ESL Students	120

State Testing
Average % Passing (school vs. state)
Grade 6
Subject	2006	
Reading	76%	83%
Mathematics	68%	51%
Grade 7
Subject	2006	
Reading	68%	81%
Mathematics	33%	44%
Grade 8
Subject	2006	
Reading	66%	72%
Writing	89%	87%
Mathematics	58%	76%
Science	74%	87%

Source: Virginia Department of Education

==== Swanson Middle School ====
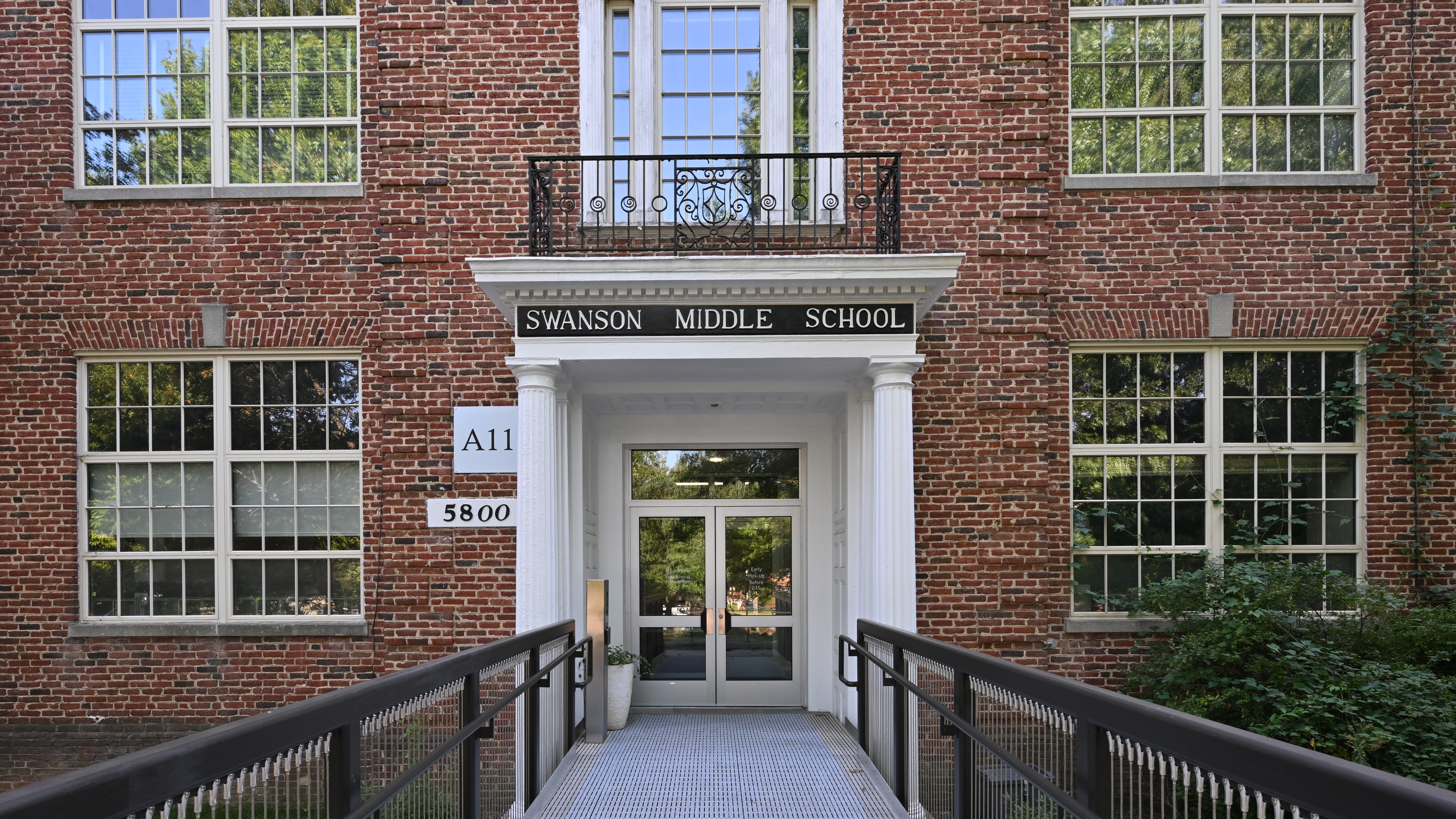
Swanson Middle School entrance, Arlington, VA

Swanson Middle School is located at 5800 North Washington Boulevard. The principal is Bridget Loft. In the 2019–2020 school year, there were 972 students enrolled and 98 teachers (8 of which have their Master's Degree. It is accredited through the Southern Association of Colleges and Schools. Swanson was built in 1939 as part of a New Deal program and is the oldest surviving middle school in the county.

Swanson is home of the Admirals, though the school's namesake, Claude A. Swanson, was Secretary of the Navy, and never an "Admiral." They wear white and maroon.

Swanson, in 2011–2012, decided to make three teams for each grade (they used to only have two per grade). For the 2016–17 school year, they have made four teams for sixth and seventh grade, as well as rename them. Since the opening of Dorothy Hamm Middle School, they have returned to three teams per grade. For sixth grade, there are the Clippers, the Navigators, and the Schooners. For seventh grade there are the Narwhals, the Manatees, and the Orcas. For eighth grade there are the Cruisers, the Galleons, and the Frigates. The names were voted on by Swanson students.

Swanson first opened its doors in 1940 as a 7th through 9th grade junior high to relieve crowding at nearby Washington-Lee High School. It is the oldest "junior high" in the state. Because of its unique contribution to education in Virginia as well as its Parisian architecture, inspired by the then recently restored Colonial Williamsburg, the school is pursuing its listing on the National Register of Historic Places. In recognition of the school's history, the Virginia State Legislature passed a resolution on Swanson's 50th anniversary in 1990 proclaiming Swanson as Virginia's first junior high school.

It was constructed with WPA funds on the site of the old Torreyson farm in the growing Westover community. One of two North Arlington junior highs targeted for closure in 1977 due to declining enrollment, Swanson reopened as an intermediate school the following year, and the 9th graders were transferred to W-L and Yorktown high schools. Stratford Junior High, although a newer facility, closed its doors. In the fall of 1990, Swanson once again housed three grades as a middle school. It has undergone several renovations, with the most recent in 2017.

Demographics
Ethnicity	2018
American Indian/Alaskan Native	00.5%
Asian/Pacific Islander	09.9%
Black	06.8%
Hispanic	15.3%
White	67.1%
Unspecified	00.3%
ESL Students	58

State Testing
Average % Passing (school vs. state)
Grade 6
Subject	2016	
Reading	78%	89%
Mathematics	66%	74%
Grade 7
Subject	2016	
Reading	79%	88%
Mathematics	78%	58%
Grade 8
Subject	2016	
Reading	55%	72%
Writing	72%	87%
Mathematics	78%	76%
Science	76%	87%

Source: Virginia Department of Education

==== Thomas Jefferson Middle School ====
Thomas Jefferson Middle School opened as a junior high school in 1938 and was named after the third president of the United States. The original cornerstone was placed with George Washington's trowel. The current facility opened in 1971 and is located at 125 South Old Glebe Road in Arlington, Virginia 22204. It is built as a rectangle with three individual corridors for each grade. Upon entering the main entrance of the school, the administrative offices are to the left and the library is further down the long hall. Here, the three corridors extend themselves to another long hall in which various classrooms are located. Also, three individual staircases are located that lead students to a lower level where lockers are located in individual lobbies. The sixth grade lobby is green, the seventh grade lobby is yellow, and the eighth grade lobby is blue. The sixth and seven grade lobbies are also used as cafeteria seating with the kitchen in the middle. These two lobbies also have small corridors that lead to the school gymnasium. It was renovated in 2010. In September 2019 a new elementary school by the name of Alice Fleet opened right next to the old entrance to the school's lobby.

Jefferson was designed for use as not only a school but also for community recreation, with the second-largest gymnasium in the state and a community theater that can seat 715 people. The principal is Ms. Keisha Boggan. The school district works with the local Division of Parks, Recreation and Community Resources to share the facilities.

The school's gymnasium is actually a part of the Thomas Jefferson Community Center. Indoors, a one-eighth mile track runs around four basketball courts and past athletic equipment. Outdoors, a half-mile bike trail runs around two athletic fields, two baseball diamonds, two basketball courts and four tennis courts. With the very large space, Arlington County uses the area for the annual Arlington County Fair every August. Most students attending TJ will go on to Wakefield High School but some will later go to Washington-Liberty High School.

Thomas Jefferson is the only middle school in Arlington Public Schools to offer the International Baccalaureate Middle Years Programme (IBMYP). Their mascot is the Yellowjackets. Their colors are yellow and blue.

Demographics
Ethnicity	2018
American Indian/Alaskan Native	00.3%
Asian/Pacific Islander	9.4%
Black	28.8%
Hispanic	43.7%
White	17.8%
Unspecified	n/a
ESL Students	114

State Testing
Average % Passing (school vs. state)
Grade 6
Subject	2006	
Reading	78%	83%
Mathematics	28%	51%
Grade 7
Subject	2006	
Reading	72%	81%
Mathematics	42%	44%
Grade 8
Subject	2006	
Reading	62%	72%
Writing	92%	87%
Mathematics	70%	76%
Science	80%	87%

Source: Virginia Department of Education

==== Williamsburg Middle School ====
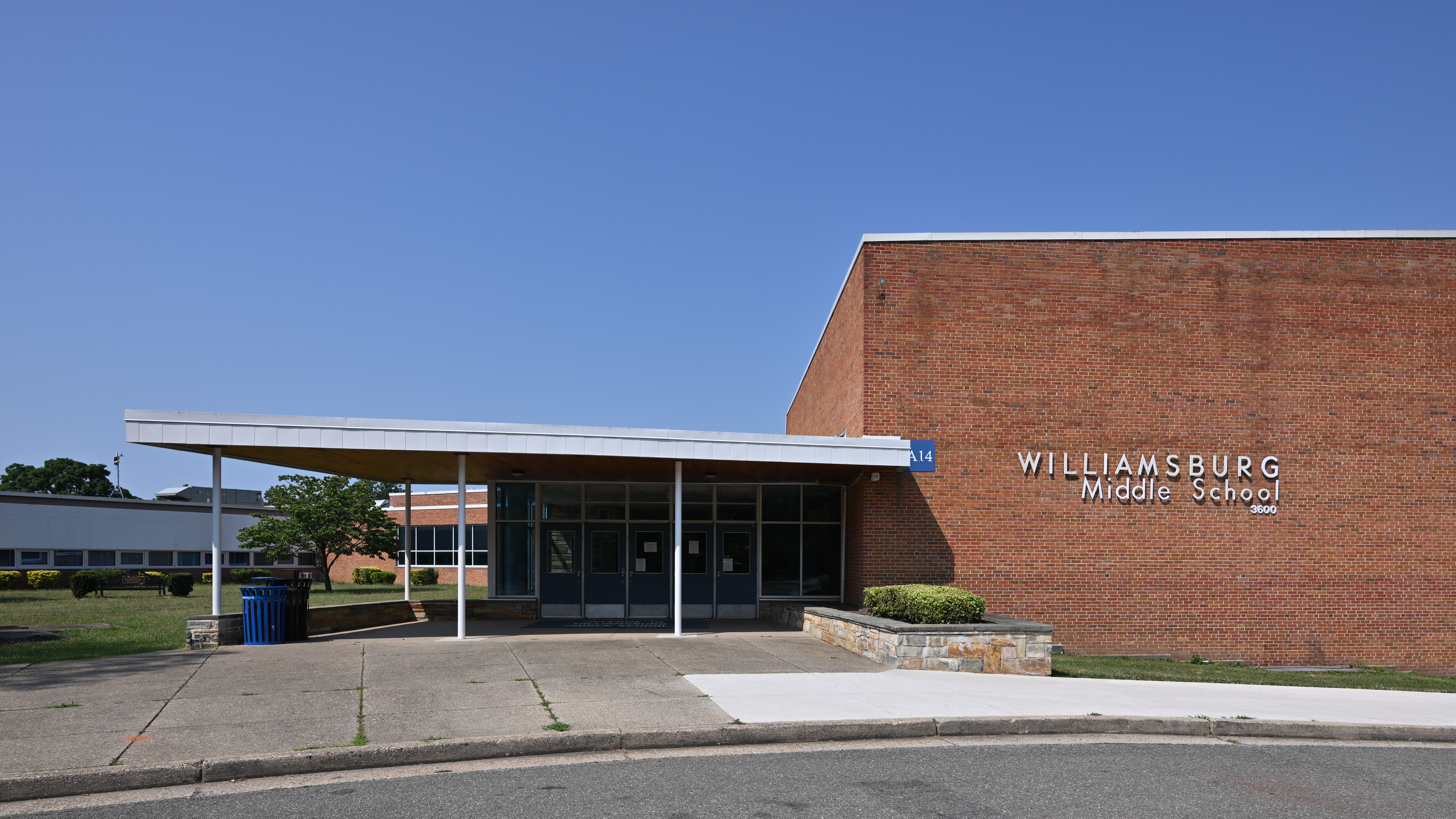
Williamsburg Middle School main entrance, Arlington, VA

Williamsburg Middle School is located at 3600 North Harrison Street. The principal is Mr Brian Boykin. In 2007–2008, there were 1,282 students enrolled and over 77 teachers (66 of which have their Master's Degree). It is accredited through the Southern Association of Colleges and Schools.

The Williamsburg mascot is the "Wolves." An eighth grade student dresses up inside a wolf costume, and interacts with their peers during special events at the school. In the 2013–2014 school year, the students named their mascot William S. Burg. The school colors are white and blue.

There are three teams in each grade (three teams in eighth) along with a separate team (Rockets) for ESOL students. The 6th grade teams consist of the Panthers, Coyotes, and Grizzlies. The 7th grade teams are the Mystics, Capitols, and the Wizards; all based on Washington DC sports teams. The 8th grade teams are based on college mascots in Virginia, and are Patriots, Cavaliers, and Hokies. Outside, there is one field currently, a baseball diamond, one tennis court and a blacktop with a basketball court and four square. There is a multi-usage weight room, an auxiliary gym and the main gym. In 2013, APS (Arlington Public Schools) started construction on a new elementary school on the WMS campus. The elementary school was named by a naming committee selected by the APS School Board, and is called Discovery Elementary School. Most kids attending Williamsburg will later on attend Yorktown High School.

Demographics
Ethnicity	2018
American Indian/Alaskan Native	0%
Asian/Pacific Islander	9%
Black	5.2%
Hispanic	11.4%
White	70%
Unspecified	4.5%
ESL Students	50

State Testing
Average % Passing (school vs. state)
Grade 6
Subject	2016	
Reading	94%	83%
Mathematics	94%	81%
Grade 7
Subject	2016	
Reading	89%	81%
Mathematics	84%	44%
Grade 8
Subject	2016	
Reading	92%	72%
Writing	97%	93%
Mathematics	87%	76%
Science	94%	87%

Source: Virginia Department of Education

=== Alternative programs ===
- Arlington Community High School – A fully accredited alternative high school for students whose life circumstances have interrupted their schooling; formerly known as Arlington Mill High School.
- Arlington Tech – A high school program with project-based learning.
- H-B Woodlawn – An alternative secondary program where students control much of their education and do not have "continuous adult supervision".
- Langston High School Continuation Program – Offers students flexibility in the way and timeframe in which students can earn a high school diploma.
- New Directions – A program designed for 30-35 students with behavioral difficulties that provides support for responsible decision making and on-time graduation.
- Eunice Kennedy Shriver Program (formerly the Stratford Program) – A secondary school for students in special education.
- Thomas Jefferson High School for Science and Technology (TJHSST)

=== Elementary schools ===
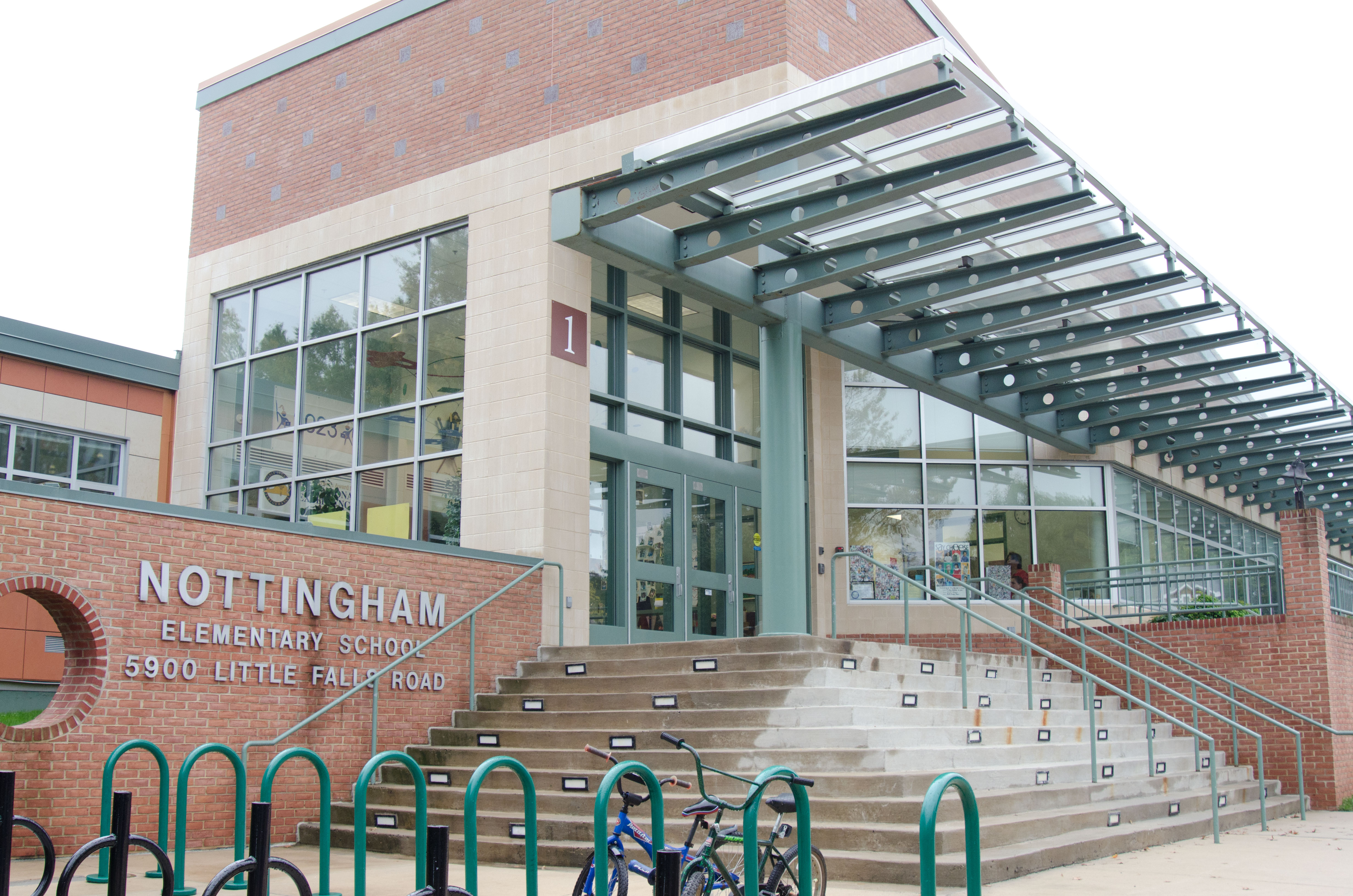
Nottingham Elementary School in Arlington County, Virginia in 2011

- Abingdon Elementary School
- Alice West Fleet Elementary School
- Arlington Science Focus Elementary School
- Arlington Traditional Elementary School
- Ashlawn Elementary School
- Barcroft Elementary School
- K.W. Barrett Elementary School
- Campbell Elementary School (formerly Glencarlyn)
- Carlin Springs Elementary School
- Claremont Immersion Elementary School
- Discovery Elementary School
- Dr. Charles R. Drew Elementary School
- Glebe Elementary School
- Hoffman-Boston Elementary School
- Jamestown Elementary School
- Francis Scott Key Immersion Elementary School
- Long Branch Elementary School
- Cardinal Elementary School
- Montessori Public School of Arlington (formerly Patrick Henry Elementary School)
- Nottingham Elementary School
- Oakridge Elementary School
- Randolph Elementary School
- Taylor Elementary School
- Tuckahoe Elementary School

=== Former schools ===
- Fairlington Elementary School (1944-1979)
- McKinley Elementary School (closed in 2021)
- Nellie Custis Elementary School
- Dolley Madison Junior High School (approx. 1947-1960)
