= Ajas, Jammu and Kashmir =

Ajas
- Village
- Location in Jammu and Kashmir, India Ajas (India)
- Coordinates: 34.33°N 74.67°E
- Country: India
- Union territory: Jammu and Kashmir
- District: Bandipora
- Tehsil: Ajas

Population (2011)
  - Total: 12,961

Languages
  - Official: Kashmiri, Urdu, Hindi, Dogri, English
- Time zone: UTC+5:30 (IST)
- PIN: 193502

Ajas is a tehsil town located in Bandipora district of the Jammu and Kashmir. The town is located at a distance of 39 kilometers from capital Srinagar and 21 kilometres from the district headquarters Bandipore. The town is situated on the banks of the famous and largest freshwater lake of India, the Wular Lake. Its circumference is partly bound by huge mountains and dense green forests.

The is one of the wildlife area and only one wildlife range in Bandipora. There are hundreds of Wild Animals like, Leopard, Black Bear, Mask Dear and many other Wild Animals. A large stream flows through the village and is called the "BudKul".

Conservation of Protected Area Networks Ajas through maintenance of species composition, enhancing food availability for flagship species, and protection by the State Wildlife Department

Strengthening the existing network of protected areas and establishment of new bird sanctuaries in the unprotected areas in the stretch of Ajas as bird sanctuary / community reserves would help protection of resident and migratory species from Central Asia

== Demographics ==
According to the 2011 census of India, Ajas has 1908 households. The literacy rate of Ajas village was 56.88% compared to 67.16% of Jammu and Kashmir. In Ajas, Male literacy stands at 68.91% while the female literacy rate was 44.24%.

Demographics (2011 Census)
	Total	Male	Female
Population	12961	6726	6235
Children aged below 6 years	2160	1190	970
Scheduled caste	0	0	0
Scheduled tribe	2483	1293	1190
Literacy	56.88%	68.91%	44.24%
Workers (all)	3966	2857	1109
Main workers (total)	2172	–	–
Marginal workers (total)	1794	870	924

== Transport ==
=== Road ===
Ajas is connected by road with other places in Jammu and Kashmir and India by the Bandipora-Srinagar Road, Ganderbal-Mansbal Road, etc.

=== Rail ===
The nearest railway stations to Ajas are Sopore railway station and Baramulla railway station, located at a distance of 29 and 38 kilometres from Ajas.

=== Air ===
The nearest airport is Srinagar International Airport located at a distance of 49 km (30 mi) respectively.

=== Places ===
Shrine of Hazrat Syed Jaffar Ud Din Bukhari (RA)

Located in Ajas, on the Bandipora–Srinagar Road -Hazrat Syed Jaffar Ud Din Bukhari (RA) was born in the 12th century in the historic city of Bukhara, in present-day Uzbekistan. Coming from a noble lineage known for its piety and deep spiritual roots, he became a towering figure in the spiritual history of the region. His life, marked by devotion and wisdom, left an enduring impact on generations of seekers.

Hazrat Jaffar Ud Din Bukhari (RA) passed away in the 13th century. His final resting place in Ajas, Bandipora, along the Srinagar-Bandipora Road, has since become a revered shrine. Today, it stands as a serene place of devotion, attracting pilgrims and spiritual seekers who come to draw inspiration and solace from his legacy.

Wular Lake

Wular Lake (Urdu pronunciation: [ʋʊlər]), also known as Wolar (Kashmiri pronunciation: [ʋɔlar]) in Kashmiri, is one of the largest fresh water lakes in South Asia.

Ajas is close to Wular Lake, which is known for its immense size and ecological significance. The lake supports a diverse range of flora and fauna and serves as a habitat for various bird species.

The lake's size varies seasonally from 30 to 189 square kilometres. In addition, much of the lake has been drained as a result of willow plantations being built on the shore in the 1950s

Orchard

Bagh-I-Nabla (Jan’s) is a private orchard owned by Nabla Begum, belonging to one of the most notable families of Ajas, popularly known as the Jans of Ajas. Located just 1.2 kilometres from the revered Shrine of Hazrat Syed Jaffar-ud-Din Bukhari (RA), the orchard offers a retreat with nature and spirituality. During the apple season, selective guests may pre-arrange apple picking, while the summer months provide an ideal setting to relax amidst lush greenery and mountain views. The iconic Wular Lake—Asia’s largest freshwater lake—is directly visible from the orchard.

=== Personalties ===
The most notable people of Ajas includes: The, “Jan” family of Kashmir- direct descendants of the great martyr- Qazi Syed Musa Shaheed (RA), have carried forth his legacy with honor. Their lives are a living testament to the values of justice, charity, and unyielding integrity. They embody the spirit of Qazi Syed Musa Shaheed (RA), their deeds a reflection of their revered ancestor's courage.

From the storied lineage of Qazi Mir Ali Bukhari, who hailed and traveled to Kashmir on invitation of Sultan Zainulabidin ( Budshah) around 15th century from Bukhara, Central Asia.However, very little is known preceding their migration from Bukhara to Kashmir. His arrival was akin to a divine gift.

=== Notable ===
The prominent family of "Ajas" , known as the Jan's, originally migrated from Central Asia to Srinagar, Kashmir around 15th century . Due to political persecution, they later relocated to Bandipora, Kashmir. Some members of the family initially settled in Qazipora, Bandipora, before gradually spreading to other parts of Bandipora and its surrounding areas.

- Qazi Syed Mohammad Jan ( Spiritual leader ) & Qazi Syed Ahad Jan ( Social leader )
- Qazi Syed Ghulam Nabi Jan ( Chairman, Land Development Bank & Social Activist )
- Qazi Syed Ghulam Ali Jan (Assistant Conservator Forest, Government of Jammu & Kashmir )

== See also ==
- Jammu and Kashmir
- Bandipora district
- Patushay
- Wular Lake
