= AIAS =

AIAS may refer to:

- Academy of Interactive Arts & Sciences
- Aias the Great
- American Institute of Architecture Students
- Association Internationale Albert Schweitzer
- Australian Institute of Aboriginal Studies, former name of Australian Institute of Aboriginal and Torres Strait Islander Studies (AIATSIS)
- Aias Gastouni F.C., association football club in Greece
