= Animal Bioscience =

- Discipline: Animal science
- Language: English
- Edited by: Jong Kyu Ha, Cheol-Heui Yun

Publication details
- Former name: Asian-Australasian Journal of Animal Sciences
- History: 1988-present
- Publisher: Australasian Association of Animal Production Societies
- Frequency: Monthly
- Impact factor: 3.2 (2025)

Standard abbreviations
- ISO 4: Anim. Biosci.

Indexing
- CODEN: ABNIAU
- ISSN: 2765-0189 (print); 2765-0235 (web)
- OCLC no.: 1252222650

Links
- Journal homepage; Online access; Online archive

Animal Bioscience is a monthly peer-reviewed open access scientific journal covering research in animal science. It was established in 1988 as the Asian-Australasian Journal of Animal Sciences, obtaining its current name in 2021. It is published by the Asian-Australasian Association of Animal Production Societies and the editors-in-chief are Jong Kyu Ha and Cheol-Heui Yun (Seoul National University).

== Abstracting and indexing ==
The journal is indexed and abstracted in:

- AGRICOLA
- Biological Abstracts
- BIOSIS Previews
- CAB Abstracts
- Chemical Abstracts Service
- Current Contents/Agricultural, Biological & Environmental Sciences
- Korea Citation Index
- Science Citation Index Expanded
- Scopus (1996-2020)

According to the Journal Citation Reports, the journal has a 2025 impact factor of 3.2.
