= American Junior Academy of Sciences =

Youth scientific society

The American Junior Academy of Sciences (AJAS) is an American society intended to encourage children and young people to participate in scientific research. The organization holds an annual conference which high school pupils can attend. Students are able to present their own research at the conference. The annual meetings are held jointly with the American Association for the Advancement of Science.
