= Standards of Learning =

Virginia public school standardized testing program

The Standards of Learning (SOL) is a public school standardized testing program in the Commonwealth of Virginia. It sets forth learning and achievement expectations for core subjects for grades K-12 in Virginia's Public Schools. The standards represent what many teachers, school administrators, parents, and business and community leaders believe schools should teach and students should learn. The Virginia Department of Education, schools, and school systems routinely receive essential feedback on the effectiveness of implementation and address effective instructional strategies and best practices.

The Standards of Learning is supportive of the No Child Left Behind Act, which was signed into law by then-President George W. Bush on January 8, 2002. They address student achievement in four critical areas: English, mathematics, science, and history or social studies. Students are assessed in English and mathematics in grades 3-8 and upon completion of certain high school level courses. Science and history SOL are administered in grades 4, 5, and 8 and at the end of completing high school courses in these respective subjects.

== History ==
In 1992, Virginia attempted adopting an education plan known as the Common Core of Learning. A largely parent-driven grassroots movement opposed the Common Core of Learning, arguing that it held no meaningful education plan and seemed to be putting more emphasis on behavioral issues than education issues. After a debate at Huguenot High School in Richmond, Virginia, Common Core of Learning was discarded and later replaced by Standards of Learning. The SOL were created through a process involving parents, teachers, and common citizens.

The SOL became the springboard for adhering to the new No Child Left Behind Act, which was enacted in January 2002. They were used as the basis for evaluation of administration, teachers, and students in public schools.

=== Establishing standards ===
In June 1995, the Virginia Department of Education (VDOE) approved the Standards of Learning in four core content areas: mathematics, science, English, and history, and social sciences. In September 1997, the Board of Education established new Standards of Accreditation (SOA) for public schools in Virginia that link statewide accountability tests to the SOL and hold students, schools, and school divisions accountable for results.

The results of the SOL directly affect the schools that administer them as much as the students. If a certain passing rate is not met each year, the school can lose its accreditation. This sets higher standards for employment and puts more responsibility on teachers and administrators to focus on areas of learning that are fundamental to the Standards of Learning. The published results of the testing also help parents who are looking for schools with high achievement for their children, putting further pressure for success on school administrators and teachers.

Before the SOL was implemented, the tests required to graduate affected the student, not the school. To graduate from high school, a student only needed to pass a sixth grade level test. As a result, 24-25% of new college freshmen needed remedial help. This level of literacy was unacceptable for the demands of the 21st century. The SOL set the bar higher for test-oriented education and performance-driven results.

==== Results over ten years ====
In 1998, the first year of SOL testing, only 2 percent of the Virginia Commonwealth's public schools met the standard for full accreditation. The percentage of schools meeting the state's accreditation standards increased to 6.5 percent in 1999, 22 percent in 2000, 40 percent in 2001, 64 percent in 2002, 78 percent in 2003, and 84 percent in 2004.

In October 2005, the state reported that 92 percent of the Commonwealth's 1,834 schools received accreditation ratings for 2005–2006, with students meeting or exceeding state achievement objectives on Standards of Learning (SOL) tests and other statewide assessments in the four core academic areas.

The VDOE stopped reporting statewide results in 2006. However, complete results of all assessments in grades 3-8 and end-of-course tests for fall, spring, and summer may be found on the School Report Cards.

=== Standards of Accreditation ===
On January 14, 2010, the Board of Education announced that personal learning plans will be created for each middle and high school student to align the student's course of study with academic and career goals. This revision was made to the Regulations Establishing Standards for Accrediting Public Schools in Virginia. The Virginia Department of Education has posted fact sheets detailing the timeline for changes, accreditation ratings, diploma requirements, and other documentation related to the SOL. Annual reports regarding the condition and needs of public education in the Commonwealth of Virginia are also located on the Virginia Government Website.

== Scoring ==
A student must get a raw score of 400 or higher on their SOL(s) in order to pass the test. A student's advancement to the next grade is not contingent on passing any SOL tests. Passing with a raw score of 500 is considered advanced/proficient. A perfect score is 600. 399 or below is considered failure.

The scores are scaled and do not correlate to the percentage of correct answers (a passing score of 400 does not indicate a student got 66% of the questions correct). Each test has its own scale and may not be the same as another SOL test.

For students in grades 7–8, SOL scores are correlated to Lexile measures. A Lexile measure can be used to match readers with targeted text and monitor growth in reading ability.

Depending on the diploma a Virginia High School student plans on completing, different SOL tests must be passed in order to receive the corresponding class credit to graduate.

Several tests have been updated to the more advanced computer adaptive test (CAT) model, in which students are given a question, and based on whether or not the student got the answer correct or not, a computer gives the student either an easier or harder question. By using this model, many students have noticed worse scores on the tests. It remains controversial.

== Controversy ==
The initial creation of the SOL caused extensive debate around both the validity of the tests and the administration of the process. Debate became more heated by the Department of Education's and the Secretary of Education's refusal to reveal information about tests or how the tests were created. The Department of Education was concerned that releasing actual tests would encourage "teaching to the test," while parents and educators were concerned that tests would be poorly written and not test the targeted subject material.

Because teachers and administrators are evaluated based on students' SOL performance, there has also been concern that teachers will focus their teaching on SOL subject matter and omit much of the overall learning that is necessary in school.

Every year, many teachers and administrators from schools around the state are invited to provide feedback on the tests. However, many teachers feel that the feedback process is just for show, and most report seeing no changes in new SOL's.

== See also ==
- NAEP, National Assessment of Educational Progress
