= Robinson Rams =

- School: Robinson Secondary
- Nickname: Rams
- VHSL: VHSL Class 6 Region C
- Conference: Patriot
- Athletic director: Andy Jimmo
- Location: Fairfax, Virginia
- Varsity teams: 18
- Football stadium: Coffey Stadium
- Basketball arena: Smith Field House
- Baseball stadium: Menefee Stadium
- Softball stadium: Gorodnick Field
- Colors: Blue and gold
- Mascot: Robbie
- Fight song: Fight On for Robinson
- Website: https://robinsonrams.com

The Robinson Rams are the athletic teams of Robinson Secondary School of Fairfax, Virginia, a suburb southwest of Washington, D.C. The school's athletic program includes 18 VHSL 6A varsity sports which compete in the Patriot District of Occoquan Region 6C, formerly the Group 6A North Region, and originally the AAA Northern Region.

== Championship teams ==
=== Football ===
The varsity football team plays at Coffey Stadium, and its helmet is currently similar to that of the Los Angeles Rams of the NFL. Given the team's popularity, long-time success, and sizable student body, the Rams regularly attract 1000 fans a game.

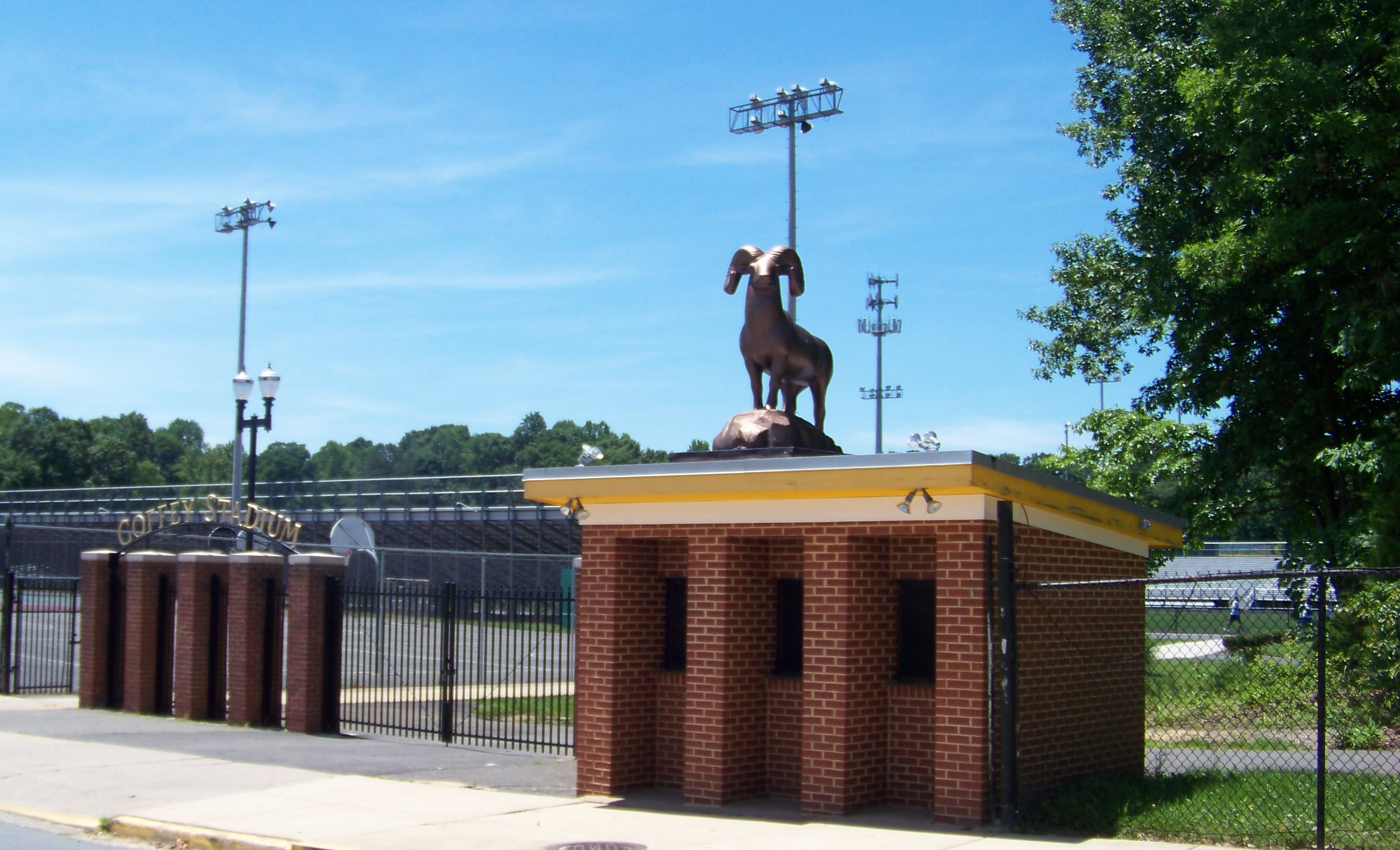
Entrance to Coffey Stadium

Robinson has appeared in the state championship game of Virginia's largest football classification (AAA Division 6) four times (1988, 1997, 2001, 2004); winning twice (1997, 2001). Robinson has won the Northern Region title six times: 1977, 1988, 1992, 1997, 2001, and 2004, and the district title (Northern ('72–'92), then Patriot ('93–'04)) in 1977, 1979, 1988, 1991, 1992, 1996, 1997, 2000, 2001, 2002, 2003, 2004, 2005 and 2009. Robinson was moved to the Concorde district in the fall of 2005.

In 2004, the Rams were undefeated through the regular season and three playoff games, but met another undefeated team, Landstown of Virginia Beach in the state finals in Richmond. Landstown won 47–20, and Robinson finished as state runner-up with a record of 13–1. Landstown featured stand out offensive and defensive player Percy Harvin who has since gone on to stardom at the University of Florida and with the Minnesota Vikings.

In 2005, the Rams went 9–1 during the regular season, but lost in the first round of the playoffs to new rival Westfield of Chantilly. In 2006, Robinson was 6–4, losing four very close games. In 2007, Robinson had an up and down 6–6 season, highlighted with a 41–14 win over Stone Bridge, the eventual 2007 AAA Division 5 state champions. The Rams made a return to the playoffs which started with a 17–14 upset over Chantilly, the 2006 AAA Division 6 Runner-up, in the first round. However, their season ended with a 30–28 loss to West Springfield in the semi-finals, when West Springfield made a field goal with only 15 seconds left in the game.

Robinson alumni who have played in the NFL include running back Chris Warren ('85) and offensive lineman Joel Patten ('76), a tight end in high school and college.

==== Head coaches ====
Gerry Pannoni was introduced in early 2026 as Robinson's new head football coach, beginning in the 2026-27 school year. Pannoni is the ninth varsity head coach at Robinson. He was preceded by Kurt Lindstrom, Ed Henry, Nick Hilgert, Mark Bendorf, Trey Taylor, Dan Meier, Scott Vossler, and Shaun Blair.

Head coach	Varsity seasons	First season	Final season	Wins	Losses	Ties	Winning percentage	Best results
Kurt Lindstrom	3	1972	1974	12	18	0	.400	8–2 in 1973
Ed Henry	8	1975	1982	43	35	5	.548	State semi-finals – 1977
Nick Hilgert	14	1983	1996	101	52	0	.660	State finals – 1988
Mark Bendorf	14	1997	2010	130	35	0	.788	State champions – 1997, 2001
Trey Taylor	2	2011	2012	9	13	0	.409	two playoff berths
Dan Meier ^	1	2013	2013	8	4	0	.667	playoff win
Scott Vossler	9	2014	2022	58	40	0	.592	Region Final/Final 8 2015, 2020
Shaun Blair	3	2023	2025	10	20	0	.300	4 - 6 regular season record in 2025
Gerry Pannoni		2026
TOTAL	53			367	211	5	.635

Robinson did not field a varsity team the first football season; it had two JV teams in 1971.
^ Former principal Meier was the interim head coach for the 2013 season.

Ed Henry, Robinson's second head coach, arrived in 1975, following a 1–9 season in 1974. After a rebuilding year in 1975 with two wins, the 1976 team improved to 5–2–3 (.650), and an 8–2 regular season in 1977, with two playoff victories and district and regional titles to finish at 10–3 (.769). Henry was the first to take the team to the postseason, in 1977 (state semi-finals) and 1979. He was a head coach in Fairfax County for over 25 years (159–82–14, .651) and was inducted into the VHSL Hall of Fame in 1997. Before coming to Robinson, he led a strong program at Marshall (44–17–1, .718) for six seasons (portrayed by Tom Nowicki in the 2000 film Remember the Titans). Before Marshall, Henry was the head coach at Annandale for 9 years (60–22–6, .716), and won a state championship in 1965. He departed Robinson after 8 seasons (43–35–5, .548) following the 1982 season to become an assistant coach at the University of Virginia.

Nick Hilgert and Mark Bendorf were former assistant coaches at Robinson, promoted from within. Hilgert, a former captain in the Marines (with two tours in Vietnam in the 1960s), was an assistant under Ed Henry for a decade at both Marshall and Robinson, initially coaching the defensive backs. He was at Robinson for a total of 21 seasons (1976–96), the final 14 years as head coach (101–52, .660). Nick Hilgert was the first head coach to take Robinson to the state finals in football (1988); he retired from teaching and coaching in the spring of 1997.

During Hilgert's tenure, Robinson produced its most famous player, running back Chris Warren (class of 1985). Warren played for the NFL Seattle Seahawks and Dallas Cowboys in the 1990s. He rushed for over 7,600 yards (6,900 m) in the NFL, including 4 consecutive seasons over 1,000 yards (910 m) while with the Seahawks (1992–95). Warren led the AFC in rushing in 1994 with 1,545 yards (1,413 m) in 333 attempts.

Mark Bendorf was a former head coach at Chantilly before joining the Robinson staff as defensive coordinator under Hilgert. Bendorf was the first coach to lead the school to a state title in football, which he did in his first season of 1997, with a perfect 14–0 record. In total, he has led the team to three state title games, winning twice (1997 & 2001) and runner-up (2004) once. Coach Bendorf also helped produce running back Mike Imoh (class of 2002), who went on to star for Virginia Tech (2002–05). Robinson's regular season records under Bendorf were impressive, specifically from 1999 to 2005, when the Rams lost only four regular season games in seven seasons. Bendorf is a 1974 graduate of Marshall High School, where he played under head coach Ed Henry, with Nick Hilgert on staff.

In his first ten seasons (1997–2006) as head coach of the Rams, Bendorf went 86–13 (.869) in the regular season (which included a 5–5 season in 1998 and 6–4 record in 2006), and was 14–6 (.700) in the postseason for an overall record of 100–19 (.840). Bendorf retired as head coach at age 55 following the 2010 season, in which the Rams went 9–3 and advanced to the regional finals (a one-point loss to Lake Braddock). His overall record in fourteen seasons was 130–35 (.788), the most wins and highest winning percentage in school history.

Bendorf was succeeded in March 2011 by Trey Taylor, 38, the head coach for five seasons (2006–10) at nearby W.T. Woodson. Taylor led the Cavaliers to a 31–23 record and to the post-season in 2008 and 2009. His 2009 Woodson team was 9–1 in the regular season and advanced to the regional finals. His first season resulted in a 4–6 regular season and a playoff berth. The 2012 Rams were 5–5 in the regular season and again made the playoffs.

Taylor was dismissed in November 2012, replaced in April by interim coach Dan Meier, recently the school's principal. The Rams were 7–3 in the regular season and won their first playoff game in 2013. Meier stepped down after the season and was succeeded by his defensive coordinator and associate head coach, Scott Vossler.

Following Vossler's nine seasons as head coach, during which he compiled a W-L record of 58-40, he went to Westfield High School to become their head football coach beginning in 2024.

After Vossler's departure, Shaun Blair was promoted to head coach in 2023. Blair had previously been an assistant coach at Robinson for six years under head coach Mark Bendorf. He had also been an assistant coach at Lake Braddock Secondary for three years, head coach at McLean High School for five years, and a defensive assistant coach at Westfield High School.

=== Wrestling ===
Since the opening of Robinson in 1971, the wrestling team has excelled. The team has won 29 district titles, 21 Regional titles and 10 state titles. Their State titles came in 1980, 1981, 1985, 2011, 2013, 2014, 2019, 2021, 2022, and 2023. The team was also state runner-up in 1974, 1975, 1984, 1987, 2010, 2012, 2017 and 2018.

Individually, as of 2022, athletes in the program had earned 221 district titles, 128 Regional titles and 32 wrestlers have earned 47 state titles. 192 athletes had earned all-state honors as of 2022.

Many Robinson wrestlers have earned All-American status while in high school and many others have gone on to college and competed at the NCAA, NAIA or JUCO levels with success including one NCAA all-American (John Epperly Jr.) a JUCO all-american (Mark Terrill) and a NAIA all-american (Jack Bass).

Robinson's boys' wrestling team has had only four head coaches in the 54 years of the school.

Head Coaches
Head Coach	Varsity Seasons	Wins	Losses	Ties	District Titles	Region Titles	State Titles
John Epperly	1972–1991	220	30	2	14	12	3
Bill Hildbold	1991–1996	59	26	1	2		
Bryan Hazard	1996–2024	310	115	1	14	10	7
Greg Flournoy	2024 - present						

More detailed information about wrestlers, teams and coaches can be found at https://robinsonrams.com/sites/robinsonrams.com/files/files/Private_User/bthazard/WRESTLING%20CHAMPIONS%202021.pdf

=== Track and field ===
Alumnus Robert Muzzio ('82) represented the United States in the decathlon at the 1992 Summer Olympics in Barcelona. The men's Indoor Track & Field team won the District Title in 2009 while the Outdoor Track & Field team won district and regional team titles in 2006.

=== Cross country ===
In addition to the state champion teams listed above, the teams also won regional championships in 1981, 1991, 1992, 2000, and 2002, and district titles in 1972, 1981, 1982, 1983, 1990, 1991, 1997, 1999, 2000, 2001, 2006, 2008 and 2010.

=== Swim and dive ===
The men's team has won seven consecutive state championships from 2003 to 2009 and has been one of the dominant swim teams in the state of Virginia. The women's team has also done exceptionally well, winning multiple district titles as well as achieving high rankings in the northern region and winning the 2009 state championship. The head coach during the first 3 years of State Champion success, and several years before this was Tracey Blaine Phillips, who is currently Robinson's principal. After Ms. Blaine (Philips) left for Hayfield, Rich Gordon was appointed head coach. Gordon resigned from the position after the 2008 season. The Robinson Swim and Dive Coach for the 2009 season was Tom Koucheravy, who led the boys and girls to state titles. Tom resigned after the 2009 season. The new coach is Clayton Joiner, assisted by Kevin Nolan. In 2010, the girls won the state title and the boys, despite having lost numerous All-Mets, managed fourth place at states.

The swim and dive team has had multiple All-Met and All-Met honorable mention swimmers and divers as well as numerous automatic All-Americans.

=== Tennis ===
The Robinson Rams boys' tennis team has been the dominant team in Virginia's Northern Region for an extended time. The Rams have won district titles in 14 of the last 15 years, and have won more than 15 total. The tennis team has amassed more than 8 regional titles, and in 2006 was the state champion (the first from the Northern Region since 1994 and the first in school history). It repeated this feat in 2007 and 2008, winning the boys' triple crown three years in a row by taking the state singles, doubles, and team titles. The tennis team has had a winning percentage of over .800 in its last 10 seasons. In February, 2007, the coach of both the Boys' and Girls' Team, Paul Fisher, was awarded the title National High School Tennis Coach of the Year by the Professional Tennis Registry (PTR).

=== Lacrosse ===
In 2006 the Virginia High School League (VHSL), the sanctioning body for Virginia public high school athletics, recognized lacrosse as an interscholastic sport and established an official state championship tournament. From the 1970s through the 2004–2005 school year, lacrosse was played as a club sport by Virginia public high schools. From 1991 through 2005, the winner of the unofficial Northern Region tournament (Fairfax County, ☆Arlington County, and the City of Alexandria public schools) was also recognized as the unofficial Virginia state champion even though other public high schools, primarily in the Charlottesville and Richmond areas, also played club lacrosse. Robinson won the unofficial Virginia state championship in 1991, 1993, 1994, 1996, 1998, 2001, and 2002. Robinson also won the first two official VHSL sanctioned state championships in 2006 and 2007, and then again in 2014, 2015, 2016, and 2024. Robinson won Region titles in 1988, 1989, 1991, 1993, 1994, 1996, 1998, 2001, 2002, 2007, 2010, 2014, 2016, 2018, 2019, 2021, 2023, and 2024; and district titles in 1988, 1989, 1991, 1992, 1993, 1994, 1995, 1996, 1998, 2000, 2001, 2002, 2003, 2004, 2005, 2006, 2007, 2010, 2014, 2016, 2017, 2018, 2021, 2022, and 2024. Since obtaining varsity status in 1991 the Robinson boys' team has a team record of 405 wins, 99 losses and 1 tie.

The history of Lacrosse at Robinson dates to 1978 when Paul St. Germaine started the Robinson Lacrosse Club. The club team played in a league which included teams from Lake Braddock HS, St. Stevens HS, Bishop Ireton HS, the Braddock Road Boys' Club and numerous teams from the Maryland suburbs. From 1982 to at least 1985 the club sport had both varsity and J.V. teams that competed in the Washington Area Lacrosse League against public and private schools, and some club teams, from Northern Virginia, Maryland and Washington, D.C.

The current head coach of the Robinson boys' varsity team is Matt Curran (2011 - present); a 1991 Robinson graduate, and 1990–91 Robinson co-Athlete of the Year (football, lacrosse); who played Division I lacrosse at Rutgers University in New Jersey. Matt was an assistant coach with the boys' varsity team from 2006 through the 2010 season. Robinson has 209 wins and 46 losses (0.820 winning percentage) under Curran.

=== Soccer ===
Robinson Varsity Boys' Soccer won the 2009 AAA Concorde District and the AAA Northern Region title. Beat Centreville High School 1–0 in District Final and Westfield High School 3–0 in Regional Final. They also won the AAA Region title in 2000.

During the 2009–10 season, the boys' varsity soccer team had a 12-game shut-out streak.

During the 2014–15 season, the boys' varsity soccer team defeated Oakton in a shoot out to claim the Conference 5 Championship with the winning penalty scored by William Zarco.

=== Baseball ===
Under head coach Bob Menefee, the Rams won the state baseball championship in 1980, and were runners-up in 1978, undefeated until a 2–1 loss in the state final at Parker Field in Richmond to hometown J.R. Tucker. The '78 Rams finished at 24–1 and had eight players that competed at the Division I level; five went on to play in the minor leagues. Robinson was a state finalist again in 2003, under head coach Bill Evers.

Alumni Shawn Camp ('94) and Javier López ('95) were relief pitchers in the major leagues.

==== Head coaches ====
Head coach	Varsity seasons	First season	Final season
Bob Menefee	18	1972	1989
Tom Peterson	11	1990	2000
Bill Evers	7	2001	2007
J.D. Detwiler	2	2008	2009
Jeff Ferrell	2	2010	2011
John James	6	2012	2018

- 2006 Media Guide – Robinson Rams baseball – include team rosters (1972–2006)

=== Softball ===
The Robinson Rams softball team plays their home games at Barry Gorodnick field. The Rams have won 8 district titles (1974, 1978, 1986, 1987, 1995, 2004, 2008, and 2015), 3 regional titles (1985, 1986, and 2007), and one state title in 1986. The head coach of the 1986 team was Cindy Waddell (90–27 overall record), whose team went 23–3 and defeated Green Run HS in the AAA state championship game by a final score of 3–0.

Barry Gorodnick, a Robinson graduate and former defensive coordinator on the Rams football team, led the Robinson softball program for 22 seasons. During his time as the head coach, Gorodnick owned a 323–184 overall record and guided the Rams to one AAA Region title in 2007. Gorodnick was diagnosed with non-Hodgkin lymphoma in December 2010, but was able to maintain his ability to coach his program until the 2012 season. Mitch Hughes took over during the 2012 season while Gorodnick was receiving treatment. Gorodnick died from the disease in May 2012 at the age of 47.

Hughes maintained the position as the Rams softball coach until the 2016 season. He guided the Rams to its most recent district title in 2015, and advanced to the regional semi-finals that same season. The current head coach for the Rams is Kevin Crenshaw, who served as an assistant under Hughes for the past two seasons.

== Campus facilities ==
- Coffey Stadium – (synthetic turf installed in 2012)
  - Field Hockey
  - Football
  - Lacrosse
  - Soccer
  - Track & Field – (track renovated in 2011)
- Smith Field House
  - Basketball
  - Cheerleading
  - Gymnastics
  - Indoor Track
  - Volleyball
  - Wrestling
- Robert M. Menefee Stadium
  - Baseball
- Barry Gorodnick Softball Field
  - Softball
- Parking Lot 3 Courts
  - Tennis

== Off-campus facilities ==
- Burke Lake Park
  - Cross Country
- South Run Recreation Center
  - Swim and Dive
