= Robinson Secondary School =

Public secondary school in Virginia, US

James W. Robinson, Jr. Secondary School

Location
- 5035 Sideburn Road; Fairfax, Virginia 22032; United States; 38.817°N 77.303°W

Information
- School type: Public, secondary school
- Motto: The Home of Champions
- Established: May 7, 1971; 55 years ago
- School district: Fairfax County Public Schools
- Principal: Tracey Phillips
- Staff: Approximately 350
- Teaching staff: 248.80 (FTE) (2016–17)
- Grades: 7–12
- Enrollment: 3,918 (2016–17)
- Student to teacher ratio: 15.83∶1 (2016–17)
- Campus: Suburban
- Colors: Royal blue Gold
- Athletics: VHSL 6A, Occoquan / Region C
- Athletics conference: Patriot
- Mascot: Rams
- Newspaper: Valor Dictus
- Yearbook: Above and Beyond
- Feeder schools: Fairview Elementary School; Terra Centre Elementary School; Bonnie Brae Elementary School; Oak View Elementary; Laurel Ridge Elementary
- Website: robinsonss.fcps.edu

James W. Robinson, Jr. Secondary School, commonly known as Robinson Secondary School, is a six-year public school in Fairfax, Virginia, United States.

Opened 55 years ago in 1971, Robinson is located south of Braddock Road near George Mason University, and is administered by the Fairfax County Public Schools. It offers the International Baccalaureate program, and has approximately 3,800 students in grades 7–12. Robinson's school colors are royal blue and gold, and the school mascot is a ram.

== History ==
Robinson was named after Medal of Honor recipient James W. Robinson, Jr., the first resident of Virginia to be awarded the medal during the Vietnam War. Sergeant Robinson, age 25, was fatally wounded under heroic circumstances in South Vietnam sixty years ago in April 1966, while serving in the infantry in the U.S. Army.

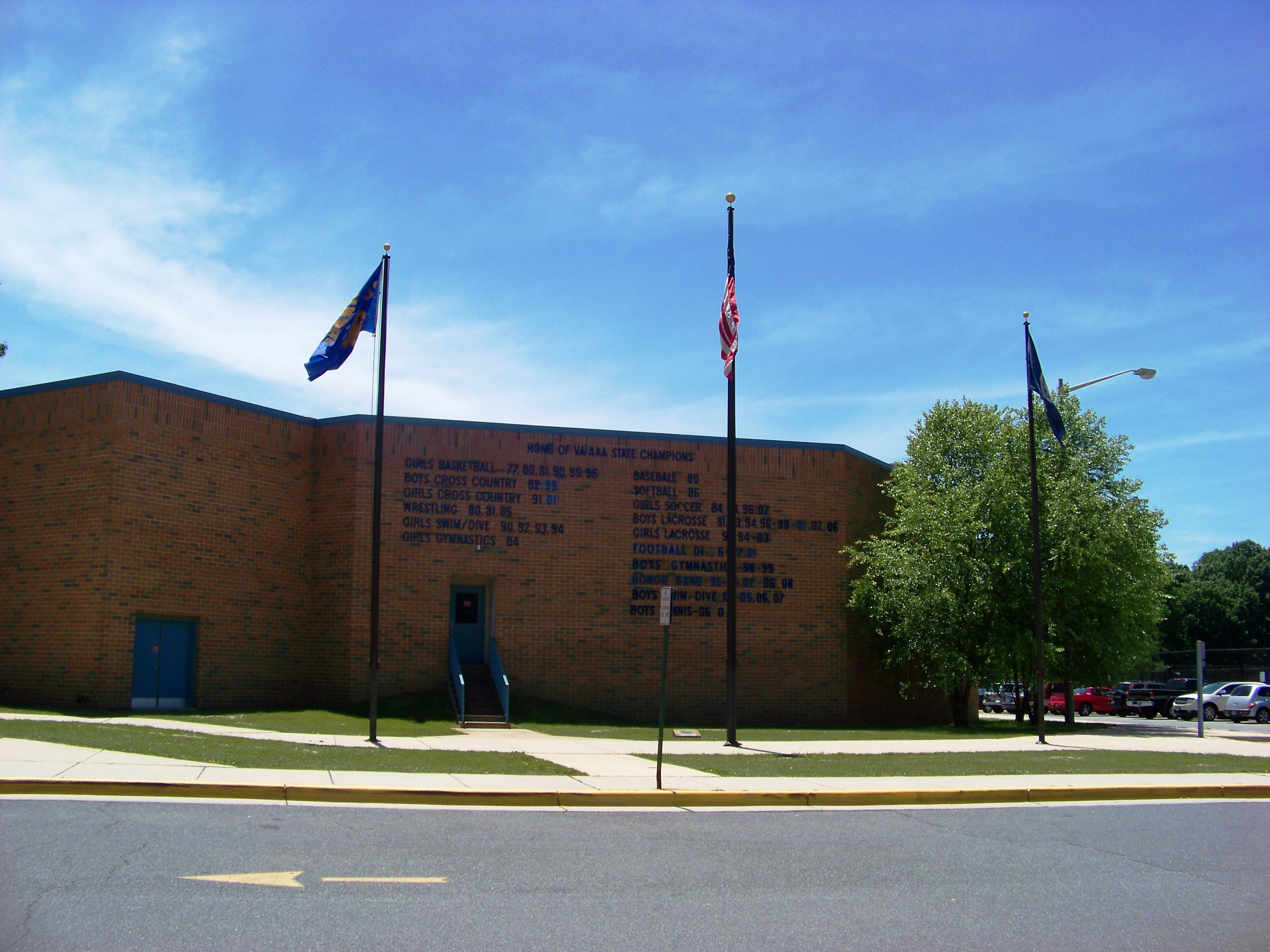
Robinson Secondary School

The school opened its doors in September 1971, taking its students from Fairfax, W.T. Woodson, Oakton, and West Springfield high schools. It was the second of Fairfax County's "secondary schools," or "superschools," which housed grades 7–12. Lake Braddock, which opened two years later in 1973, was the third of these schools from this era. The first was Hayfield, near Mount Vernon, which opened in 1968, and the most recent is South County in Lorton, which opened in 2005, taking its students from former Hayfield territory. South County has since reverted to high school status with the opening of South County Middle School near the school's athletic gym.

== Awards and recognitions ==
Robinson won the 2018–19 Wells Fargo Cup race, which is presented annually to Virginia public high schools that have "demonstrated extraordinary success in academic activities throughout the year". This was the first time Robinson has won the Wells Fargo Cup for Academics.

In 2025, Robinson won the Virginia High School League's Class 6A National Guard Cups for the best overall interscholastic competition record in both academics and athletics during the 2024–25 school year.

== Demographics ==
For the 2024–25 school year, Robinson's grade 9–12 student body was 54.65% White, 13.35% Asian, 18.08% Hispanic, 6.62% Black and 7.30% other races. The grade 7–8 student body was 57.85% White, 12.13% Asian, 15.78% Hispanic, 6.45% Black and 7.80% other races.

== Music Department ==
Robinson Secondary School has earned a reputation for musical excellence, with its ensembles frequently achieving superior ratings at state and national competitions.

=== Ensembles and offerings ===
The program includes a variety of ensembles, catering to students with diverse musical interests and skill levels:

- Bands – The school has several concert bands, including Symphonic Band, Concert Band, as well as an award-winning marching band known as the Robinson Marching Rams.
- Orchestras – Students can participate in multiple string orchestras, such as the Philharmonic Orchestra and Chamber Orchestra, which consistently receive high rankings in competitions.
- Choirs – The choral program features multiple vocal groups, providing students with opportunities to develop vocal technique and performance skills.
- Jazz and Contemporary Ensembles – The school offers jazz band and contemporary music groups, allowing students to explore different musical genres.

=== Achievements and recognitions ===
Robinson's music ensembles have been recognized at state, national, and international levels. The marching band frequently competes in the Virginia Marching Band Cooperative (VMBC) and Bands of America (BOA) events. Robinson has been recognized as a "Thirty Year Virginia Honor Band", earning a membership in the VBODA Hall of Fame. The Robinson Symphonic Band has appeared at five VMEA state conferences, one ASBDA convention, four National Concert Band Festivals and the Midwest Band and Orchestra Clinic. Many students earn placements in District, Regional, and All-State Honor Ensembles. Robinson also attended the 79th annual Midwest Clinic.

== LSD scandal ==
In 1991, Robinson was the center of an LSD trafficking scandal in which a drug ring sold more than 100,000 doses of LSD over two years. The ring was exposed when a 16-year-old Robinson student shot and wounded a Fairfax police officer. In the course of the investigation it was revealed that six Robinson and Lake Braddock graduates were receiving large quantities of the drug through the mail. One of the men who was facing the harshest penalties faked suicide and fled the area, only to be caught two years later in St. Louis and sentenced to 24 years in prison with no possibility of parole.

== Notable alumni ==
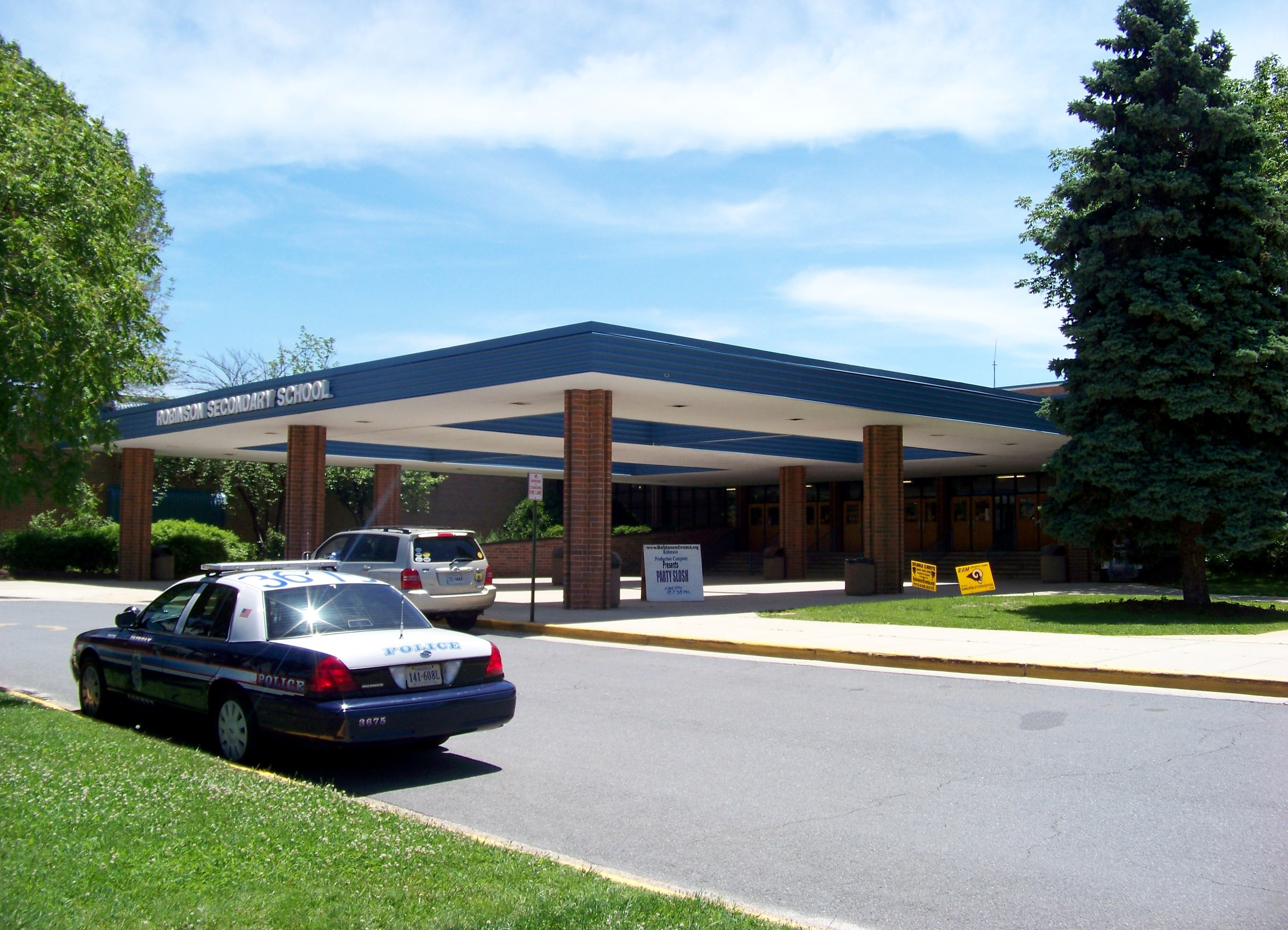
Entrance to the school

- Dan Adams, linebacker at Holy Cross, former NCAA record holder
- Bonnie X Clyde, members Daniel Litman and Paige Lopynski, electronic dance musicians
- Dave Brockie (class of 1981), founder, guitarist, and vocalist, of Gwar
- Shawn Camp (class of 1994), MLB pitcher
- Paul Clemens (class of 2006), MLB pitcher
- Drew Courtney (class of 2008), former professional tennis player
- Andrew Dumm (class of 2003), long-distance runner, winner of the 2008 Marine Corps Marathon
- Steve Dunn (class of 1988), MLB first baseman, Minnesota Twins
- Jill Ellis (class of 1984), head coach, United States women's national soccer team
- Scott Ellis (class of 1975), Broadway director; five-time Tony Award nominee, Emmy nominee; received the Drama Desk Award
- Dan Gill (class of 2000), former United States men's national artistic gymnastics team gymnast and current businessman
- John Gilstrap (class of 1975), thriller novelist and New York Times best selling author
- Mike Imoh (class of 2002), running back, Virginia Tech and Montreal Alouettes of CFL
- Lucas Kozeniesky, standing men's 10 metre air rifle; 2016 Summer Olympics & 2020 Summer Olympics silver medalist
- Jae Lee (class of 1990), artist, Marvel Comics, DC Comics, Image Comics, and Dynamite Entertainment
- Tristan Leigh (class of 2021) NFL offensive tackle, Minnesota Vikings, college football at Clemson
- Kjell N. Lindgren (class of 1991), NASA astronaut who spent five months on the International Space Station as part of Expedition 44 in 2015
- Alfonso H. Lopez (class of 1988), former Obama administration official, member of the Virginia House of Delegates
- Javier López (class of 1995), MLB pitcher, San Francisco Giants
- Carmen Lynch, stand-up comedian
- Megan McCarthy (class of 1984), international soccer player
- Rob Muzzio (class of 1982), two-time NCAA decathlon champion, fifth in decathlon in 1992 Summer Olympics
- Rob Olson (class of 1977), international soccer player
- Joel Patten (class of 1976), NFL offensive tackle (& USFL), tight end and tackle at Duke
- Alex Riley (class of 1999), professional wrestler
- Byron Saxton (class of 1999), professional wrestler
- Mike Schleibaum, guitarist, Darkest Hour
- Scott Urick (class of 1995), 2006 U.S. Men's National Team in World Lacrosse Championship; former Georgetown Hoyas assistant coach; current head lacrosse coach, University of the District of Columbia
- Chip Vaughn, NFL defensive back, New Orleans Saints and Saskatchewan Roughriders (CFL)
- Brandon Wardell (class of 2010), stand-up comedian
- Chris Warren (class of 1985), NFL running back
- Kevin Whitaker (class of 1975)*, former U.S. Ambassador to Colombia (*attended Robinson in grades 9–11, but spent his senior year at Merritt Island High School in Merritt Island, Florida, and graduated from there.)
