= Rob Olson =

US soccer player

Personal information
- Date of birth: June 9, 1959 (age 67)
- Place of birth: Fairfax, United States
- Position: Forward

Youth career
- 1977–1980: William and Mary

Senior career*
Years	Team	Apps	(Gls)
1982	Georgia Generals		
1983	Team America	1	(0)
1985	Kalamazoo Kangaroos (indoor)		
1988	Washington Stars		

International career
1983	United States	1	(0)
- * Club domestic league appearances and goals

Rob Olson, also known as Robbie Olson and Rob Olsen, is a retired U.S. soccer player who is director of operations and coaching for the Virginia-based Southwestern Youth Association Soccer (SYA Soccer).

== Youth ==
Olson graduated from Robinson Secondary School in Fairfax County, Virginia. He then attended the College of William and Mary from 1977 to 1980, where he played as a forward on the men's soccer team. He is ranked 2nd on the school's list of career goals with 33.

== Professional ==
Olson joined the Georgia Generals of the American Soccer League in 1982. In 1983, the U.S. Soccer Federation, in coordination with the North American Soccer League (NASL), entered the U.S. national team, known as Team America, into the NASL as a league franchise. The team drew on U.S. citizens playing in the NASL, Major Indoor Soccer League and American Soccer League. Two players from the Georgia Generals, Olson and teammate Sonny Askew, signed with Team America. When Team America finished the 1983 season with a 10–20 record, the worst in the NASL, the USSF withdrew the team from the league. In 1985, Olson played with the Kalamazoo Kangaroos of the American Indoor Soccer Association. Finally, in 1988, he reunited with Georgia Generals and Team America teammate Askew when both played for the Washington Stars of the newly re-established ASL.

== National team ==
Olson earned his single cap with the U.S. national team when he came on as a substitute for Boris Bandov in the only U.S. game of 1983.

== Post-playing career ==
He joined SYA Soccer in 1986 and became the assistant director of Soccer Education since 1997. He is the current Director of Operations and Coaching.

On May 13, 2006, he was inducted into the Virginia Soccer Hall of Fame.

He coached the Centreville High School Girl's Varsity soccer team, as well as his 3 SYA teams.
