= SYA =

Sya or SYA may refer to:

== Places ==
- Sya, Sweden, locality in Östergötland County, Sweden
- IATA airport code for Eareckson Air Station in Alaska

== Languages ==
- Siang language (ISO 639: sya), Malayo-Polynesian language of Indonesia
- Sya language, Afro-Asiatic language of Nigeria

== Other uses ==
- Southwestern Youth Association, an American youth sports league for Centreville and Clifton, Virginia
- School Year Abroad, an American school which places pupil in a school abroad for an academic year
- Sya Dembélé (born 2007), French breakdancer

== See also ==
- Siya
