= Megan McCarthy =

American soccer player (born 1966)

Personal information
- Full name: Megan Maire McCarthy
- Date of birth: September 20, 1966 (age 60)
- Place of birth: United States
- Height: 5 ft 6 in (1.68 m)
- Position: Defender

Youth career
- Braddock Road Youth Club
- 1981–1984: Robinson Rams

College career
Years	Team	Apps	(Gls)
1984–1987	William & Mary Tribe		

Senior career*
Years	Team	Apps	(Gls)
1988–1989	Prato Wonder		
1995–1998	Maryland Pride		

International career
1987–1994	United States	42	(0)

Managerial career
- 1988: William & Mary Tribe (assistant)
- 1993: George Mason Patriots (assistant)
- 1993–1999: Centreville Wildcats (assistant)
- 1999–2005: Braddock Road Youth Club
- 2004–2005: Centreville Wildcats (assistant)
- * Club domestic league appearances and goals

Megan Maire McCarthy (born September 20, 1966) is an American former soccer player who played as a defender, making 42 appearances for the United States women's national team.

== Career ==
In high school, McCarthy played for the Rams of Robinson Secondary School from 1981 to 1984. She was selected as an NSCAA High School All-American in 1983 and 1984, leading the Rams to a Virginia state championship. She also played for the youth team Braddock Road Youth Club, becoming under-19 national champions in 1984. Jill Ellis also attended and played soccer at Robinson Secondary School, and joined Braddock Road upon McCarthy's recommendation. In 1984, McCarthy began attending the College of William & Mary, playing for the Tribe soccer varsity team. She was selected as an NCAA Collegiate All-American in 1985, 1986, and 1987, as well as NCAA Co-Freshman of the Year in 1984 and ISAA/NCAA Collegiate Player of the Year in 1987.

During her professional career, she played with Italian club Prato Wonder of Serie A in Prato, near Florence, during the 1988–89 season. She later played for Maryland Pride between 1995 and 1998.

McCarthy made her international debut for the United States on July 5, 1987 in a friendly match against Norway. In total, she made 42 appearances for the U.S., earning her final cap on April 14, 1994 in a friendly match against Canada.

McCarthy has been inducted into the William & Mary Tribe Athletics Hall of Fame in 1998, the Virginia–D.C. Soccer Hall of Fame in 2003, the Virginia High School Hall of Fame in 2008, and the Robinson Rams Hall of Fame in 2013. In 2001 she was awarded the National Soccer Medal of Honor by the National Soccer Hall of Fame as part of the 1991 FIFA Women's World Cup winning-team (though she was not included in the final tournament squad).

== Personal life ==
In 1993, McCarthy began teaching mathematics at Centreville High School in Clifton, Virginia.

== Career statistics ==
=== International ===
United States
Year	Apps	Goals
1987	10	0
1988	6	0
1990	4	0
1991	15	0
1993	2	0
1994	5	0
Total	42	0
