= George C. Marshall High School =

Public secondary school in Virginia, United States

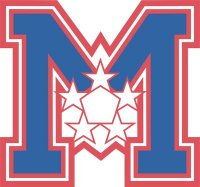

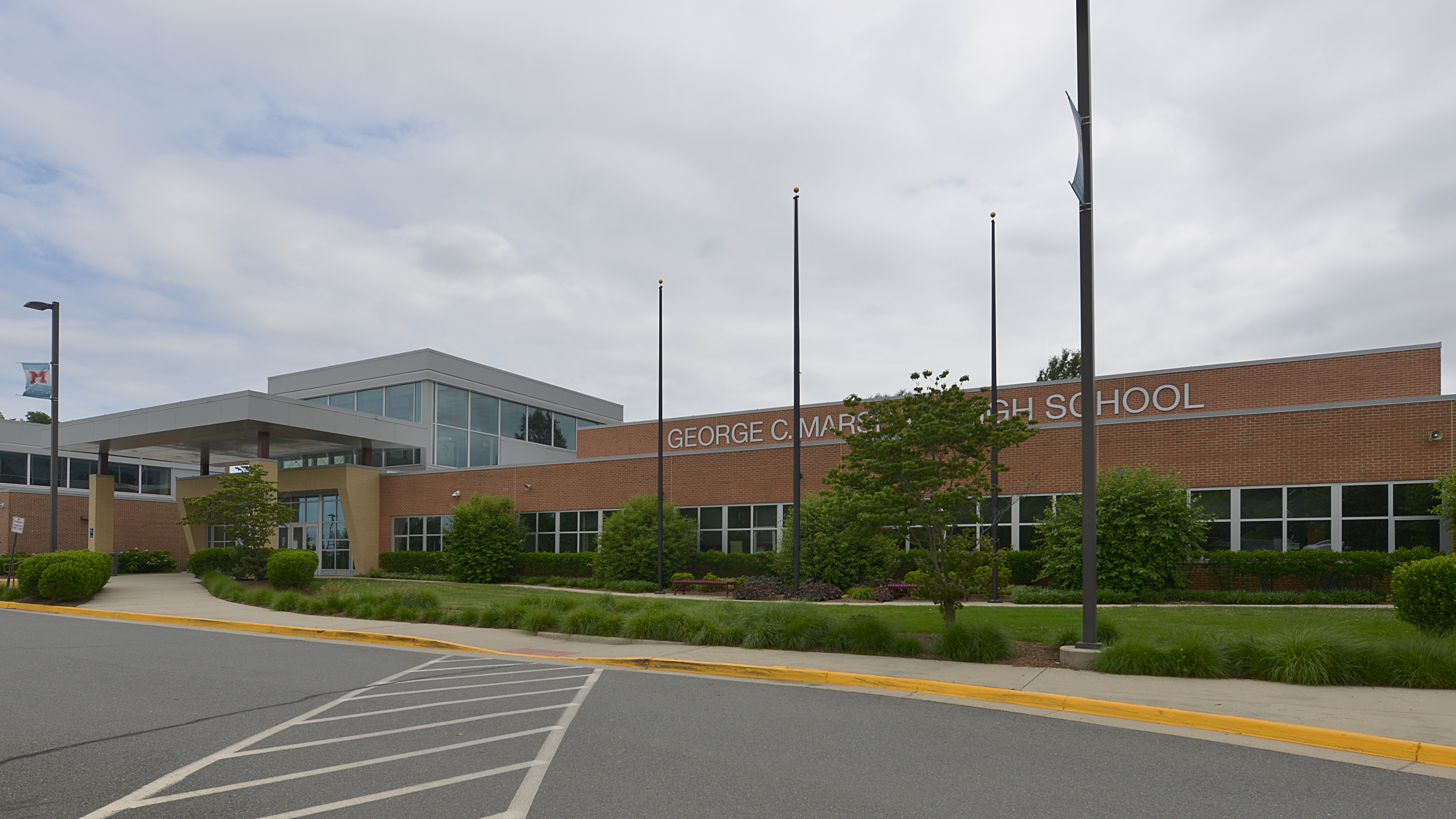

Location
- 7731 Leesburg Pike; Falls Church, Virginia address, Fairfax County, Virginia 22043; United States; 38°54′22″N 77°12′47″W

Information
- Type: Public secondary
- Motto: Small School, Big Heart
- Established: August 4, 1962; 64 years ago
- School district: Fairfax County Public Schools
- NCES District ID: 5101260
- Educational authority: Virginia Department of Education
- School code: VA-029-0291290
- CEEB code: 470794
- NCES School ID: 510126000535
- Principal: Anthony Harris
- Faculty: 136.23 (on an FTE basis)
- Grades: 9–12
- Gender: Coeducational
- Enrollment: 2,190 (2024-2025)
  - Grade 9: 519
  - Grade 10: 564
  - Grade 11: 568
  - Grade 12: 539
- Student to teacher ratio: 15.18:1
- Campus type: Large suburb
- Colors: Scarlet; Columbia blue
- Athletics conference: AAA Liberty District Region D
- Mascot: Griffin
- Nickname: Statesmen
- USNWR ranking: 247
- Newspaper: Rank & File
- Yearbook: The Columbian
- Website: marshallhs.fcps.edu

George C. Marshall High School is an American public school in Idylwood, Fairfax County, Virginia. It has a postal address using "Falls Church" as the city name, and the Falls Church News-Press describes it as being in "Greater Falls Church".

Named for General George C. Marshall, it opened in 1962 and is part of Fairfax County Public Schools (FCPS). It is ranked #245 in the nation for public schools and has received a gold award for Best High Schools from the U.S. News & World Report 2020. It is ranked 4th in Virginia and 4th in Fairfax County. George C. Marshall High School is a fully accredited high school based on Virginia's Standards of Learning tests.

== Curriculum ==
Most Marshall students passed the end-of-year exams during the 2017-2018 school year. The graduation rate was 96%.

Subject	Accreditation Pass Rate
English	97%
History	96%
Mathematics	93%
Science	95%

== Admissions ==
Below are the demographics as of April 2026 school year at Marshall High School:

Gender	Marshall Percentage	FCPS High School Average
Male	52.67%	52.0%
Female	47.33%	48.0%

Ethnicity	Marshall Percentage	FCPS High School Average
American Indian / Alaska Native	0.27%	0.3%
Asian	22.45%	18.7%
Black/ African American	6.46%	9.8%
Hispanic/ Latino	22.54%	28.7%
Native Hawaiian/ Pacific Islander	0.09%	0.1%
Two or More Races	7.38%	6.3%
White	40.82%	36.1%

20.78%, or 455 students, were eligible for free or reduced lunch in the 2024-2025 school year.

== Extracurricular activities ==
Marshall High School has over 30 extracurricular activities available for its students and over ten honor societies available for high-achieving students.

Marshall has a growing orchestra, band, choir, and theatre program. They participate in numerous competitions annually, such as the District Performance Assessment and the Music Heritage Festival.

=== Athletics ===
Marshall's teams are nicknamed the Statesmen, their mascot is the griffin (a half lion, half eagle creature), and their teams play in the AAA Liberty District and Northern Region of the Virginia High School League. While Marshall's enrollment had been at the AA level, and the school had needed to petition to play in AAA to the VHSL to maintain rivalries with local schools, the school's enrollment had increased to over 1900 students by the fall of 2014.

In 2016, the girls' cross country team won the 5A State Championships at the Great Meadows course in The Plains, Virginia. The overall team score was 53 points, 54 points ahead of second place Tuscarora High School (Virginia).

==== State team championships ====
Marshall has four team state championship titles, which are:

- two in AAA boys' cross country in 1971 (shared with Menchville High School) and 1972
- one in AAA girls' basketball in 1976
- one in 5A girls' cross country in 2016

=== Orchestra ===
The Marshall Orchestra Program consists of four orchestras: The Marshall Concert Orchestra, Symphonic Orchestra, Philharmonic Orchestra, and Statesmen Sinfonia. During the 2014-2015 school year, it has grown to include more than 120 members. The first three orchestras have received superior ratings at the District Performance Assessment for the past three years. They have also received a gold rating and an adjudicator's award for their performance during the 2011 Music Heritage Festival. Statesmen Sinfonia is a new ensemble introduced in the 2014-2015 school year due to the growing number of members.

=== Band ===
The Marshall Band Program is composed of two subgroups: Concert Band and Wind Symphony. The Marshall Band has held the Honor Band title for three years consecutively.

Marshall has many extracurricular bands, including Marshall's "Marching Statesmen", which have come in 1st place at multiple competitions. They went to the marching band state competition for the first time in October 2015. There is also a Marshall Jazz Band, which performs at school and community events. The band offerings at Marshall also include indoor drumline, percussion ensemble, flute choir, and IB music. The percussion ensemble has also been recognized for its achievement. They were invited to the Indianapolis Music for All National Percussion Festival in March 2009. The event is part of the Bands of America National Convert Festival. The John Philip Sousa Foundation awarded the Marshall Band the Sudler Flag of Honor in 1994.

Marshall High School is also home to an award-winning program, which won the District level competition nine years running, and won the championship at the AAA State Finals of the Virginia High School League One-Act Festival five times (2000, 2001, 2003, 2005, 2007), which is the record for most wins among all Virginia high schools. Furthermore, the department is known for allowing students to perform shows with more adult themes, such as uncensored versions of Company and Chicago.

=== Cyber Patriot ===
The Cyber Patriot Program is sponsored by the Air Force Association. Competitors are given virtual machines with vulnerabilities in them. In the allotted amount of time, they must correctly identify and rectify all vulnerabilities, usually viruses, while maintaining critical services. At the national finals, the competitors also have to complete networking and digital forensics challenges.

Marshall started its Cyber Patriot Program during the 2011-2012 school year. A non-affiliated company, Terrawi, provided most of the resources and training materials to help adequately prepare the teams for competition. The original two teams, which consisted of twelve members, placed 7th in the nation during the final round of competition.

Of the original three teams, the Marshall Cyber Patriot Program sent two teams to the Cyber Patriot National Finals, held on March 15, 2013, at the Gaylord Hotel in Maryland. Both teams finished in the top 3 of the open division, along with their state rival, Chantilly High School, which placed top in the nation. Following the competition, the team is expected to compete in several competitions against other schools. Several other high schools in Fairfax County have asked the Marshall Cyber Patriot Program to help start up Cyber Patriot Programs.

=== Future Problem Solving ===
Marshall High School started its Future Problem Solving Club in 2012-2013. During its first year, the club consisted of four members who competed as a single team. The team passed through the Regional Competition, being one of two teams to represent Fairfax County at the State Bowl. At the state bowl, the Marshall team was a finalist in the middle division and received first place in the action plan presentation for their humorous portrayal of Romeo and Juliet.

=== Model United Nations ===
Marshall High School has a growing Model United Nations club, which has grown to include more than 100 members during the 2016-17 school year. The club competes in notable tournaments annually, such as VAMUN, William and Mary MUN, and HenMUN. Marshall High School organizes My First MUN every September to prepare new MUN delegates for future MUN conferences. Marshall held the first CIMUNE conference in January 2015, a Model UN conference completely in Spanish.

== Notable alumni ==
- Mike Brown (1977): Major League Baseball player from 1982 to 1987 with the Boston Red Sox and Seattle Mariners.
- Louisa Krause (2004): Actress who has appeared in films such as Martha Marcy May Marlene and Young Adult.
- Keith Lyle (1990): Played safety for the L.A. and St. Louis Rams, Washington Redskins, and San Diego Chargers in the NFL from 1994 to 2002
- Ilia Malinin (2023): U.S. Olympic figure skater; three time World Figure Skating Championships winner and Olympic gold medalist in the team event.
- Michael McCrary (1988): Played defensive end for the Seattle Seahawks and Baltimore Ravens in the NFL from 1993 to 2002
- Harun Mehmedinović (2001): Filmmaker, journalist, and photographer, director of In the Name of the Son
- Gayil Nalls (1971): Renowned multimedia artist who works with art and olfaction (smell)
- Sean O'Neill (1985): Table tennis player, 5-time US men's singles champion, 2-time US Olympic team member (1988, 1992).
- Brent Runyon (1995): Author of The Burn Journals (2004), Maybe (2006), and Surface Tension: A Novel in Four Summers (2009)
- Pete Schourek (1987): MLB pitcher from 1991 to 2001; second in 1995 National League Cy Young Award voting.
- Nick Sorensen (1996): Played safety for the St. Louis Rams, Jacksonville Jaguars, and the Cleveland Browns in the NFL. Sorensen now is currently the Defensive Coordinator of the San Francisco 49ers.
- Kathrine Switzer (1964): Pioneer female distance runner; first woman to run the Boston Marathon (1967) with an official race number

== Controversies ==
=== Gang violence ===
On February 27, 1998, at 12:20 pm, David Albrecht, a 17-year-old Pimmit Hills Alternative High School student, drove his Chevrolet Monte Carlo into Marshall's rear parking lot. With him in the car was a former student who had recently quit school. Right behind him was a dark-colored sports utility vehicle. The SUV pulled up alongside David's Monte Carlo, and the driver pulled out a .22-caliber rifle. Two to three shots were fired before the SUV left the parking lot. David, 17, was struck in the head and died from his wounds. His passenger, an 18-year-old, had escaped injury by ducking down. Police later confirmed that members of the Tiny Rascal Gang Asian youth gang did this shooting.

=== Discrimination case ===
During the 2011-2012 School Year at George C. Marshall High School, a dispute occurred between an English teacher and a black student. The teacher asked an African American student to read a Langston Hughes poem in a "blacker" way. Marshall administrators immediately launched an investigation into the alleged incident.

=== Remember the Titans ===
In the movie Remember the Titans (2000), the climax of the film comes at the end of the 1971 AAA state championship football game between T.C. Williams High School and George Marshall High School. The movie was dramatized from a Washington Post series about race relations in the high school football fishbowl of 1971, as the Hollywood underdog T.C. Williams Titans took on the powerful Marshall Statesmen (coached by Ed Henry). The most notable dramatic license taken in the movie was to convert what was a regular-season matchup between Marshall and T.C. Williams into a made-for-Hollywood state championship. In reality, the Marshall game was the most challenging game T.C. Williams played all year, and the actual state championship (against Andrew Lewis High School of the Roanoke Valley) was a 27-0 blowout. The Titans won the Marshall game on a fourth down come-from-behind play at the end of the game. In addition to the added drama of the Marshall game, there were legal issues concerning using Andrew Lewis High School's name in the movie.

Ignored in both the original newspaper articles and the movie is the fact that in 1971, the city of Alexandria consolidated three four-year high schools into a single two-year school, with only juniors and seniors. As a result, the best of the varsity football squads at George Washington High School (converted to a middle school), Hammond High School (converted to a middle school) and T.C Williams High School united in what amounted to an all-city, all-star team at T.C. Williams.

The legendary Ed Henry was the head coach at Marshall for six seasons, from 1969 to 1974, and is portrayed in the movie. In 1997, the Virginia High School League Hall of Fame inducted Henry.
