= Patriot District =

High School Athletic Conference
- Founded: 1993
- Affiliation: Virginia High School League
- Region: Region 6C (Class 6)
- Teams: 8

The Patriot District is a high school athletic conference in Northern Virginia affiliated with the Virginia High School League (VHSL). It comprises public high schools located in eastern Fairfax County and the City of Alexandria. The district is part of VHSL's Class 6, Region C.

== History ==
The Patriot District was established in 1993 as part of a VHSL Northern Region realignment. Original members included Annandale High School, Hayfield Secondary School, Lake Braddock Secondary School, Robinson Secondary School, T.C. Williams High School (now Alexandria City High School), and West Springfield High School.

Over time, district membership shifted:

- South County High School and Robert E. Lee High School (now John R. Lewis High School) joined in 2005.
- Robinson Secondary School moved to the Concorde District.
- Hayfield Secondary School moved to the National District in 2009.
- W.T. Woodson High School joined the Patriot District in 2009.

Since the 2017 VHSL statewide realignment, the Patriot District has maintained consistent membership.

== Member schools ==
As of the 2024–25 academic year, the Patriot District includes the following schools:

School	Location	Mascot	School Colors
Alexandria City High School	Alexandria	Titans	Blue, White, Red
Fairfax High School	Fairfax	Lions	Blue, Gray, White
Lake Braddock Secondary School	Burke	Bruins	Purple, Gold
Robinson Secondary School	Fairfax	Rams	Royal Blue, Gold
South County High School	Lorton	Stallions	Forest Green, Navy, Silver
West Potomac High School	Alexandria	Wolverines	Royal Blue, Silver
West Springfield High School	Springfield	Spartans	Orange, Blue
W.T. Woodson High School	Fairfax	Cavaliers	Navy, Red, White

== Championship highlights ==
The Patriot District has produced numerous regional and state champions:

Selected VHSL State Championships
School	Sport	Title	Year	Ref
W.T. Woodson High School	Boys Basketball	VHSL Class 6A State Champions	2017	
Alexandria City High School	Girls Volleyball	VHSL Class 6A State Champions	2022	
Robinson Secondary School	Girls Golf	VHSL State Champions	2023	
Lake Braddock Secondary School	Girls Gymnastics	VHSL Class 6 State Champions	2022–2025	

== Notable athletes and coaches ==
- Briana Williams (West Potomac HS) – Olympic gold medal sprinter; broke the U.S. high school 100m record in 2019 with a 10.94 time.
- Noah Lyles (Alexandria City High School) – Olympic gold medal sprinter; VHSL 200m dash (20.04) and 100m dash (10.07) record holder.
- Tony Rojas (Fairfax High School) – D1 Linebacker at Penn State University; Won Region Championship with Fairfax in 2023
- Nick Scott (Fairfax High School) – NFL Safety for the Carolina Panthers; Penn State graduate and Super Bowl Champion with the Los Angeles Rams in 2022
- George Duangmanee – Collegiate Golfer for UVA; Appeared at the U.S. Open and Myrtle Beach Classic in 2025
- Katie Vu (Robinson SS) – 2023 VHSL Girls State Golf Champion.
- Jason Aigner and Matthew Urbach (Woodson HS) – Key players in Woodson's 2017 basketball state title win.
- Coach Doug Craig (Woodson HS) – Led Cavaliers to their first state basketball championship in 2017.
- Coach Herman Boone (T.C. Williams HS / Alexandria City) – Coached the 1971 state champion football team made famous in Remember the Titans.

== Governance ==
The district is administered by a board of athletic directors and principals from member schools, under VHSL authority. Schedules, eligibility, and postseason qualification are governed by VHSL bylaws.

== See also ==
- Virginia High School League
- Concorde District
- National District
- Liberty District
