= Fairfax High School (Fairfax, Virginia) =

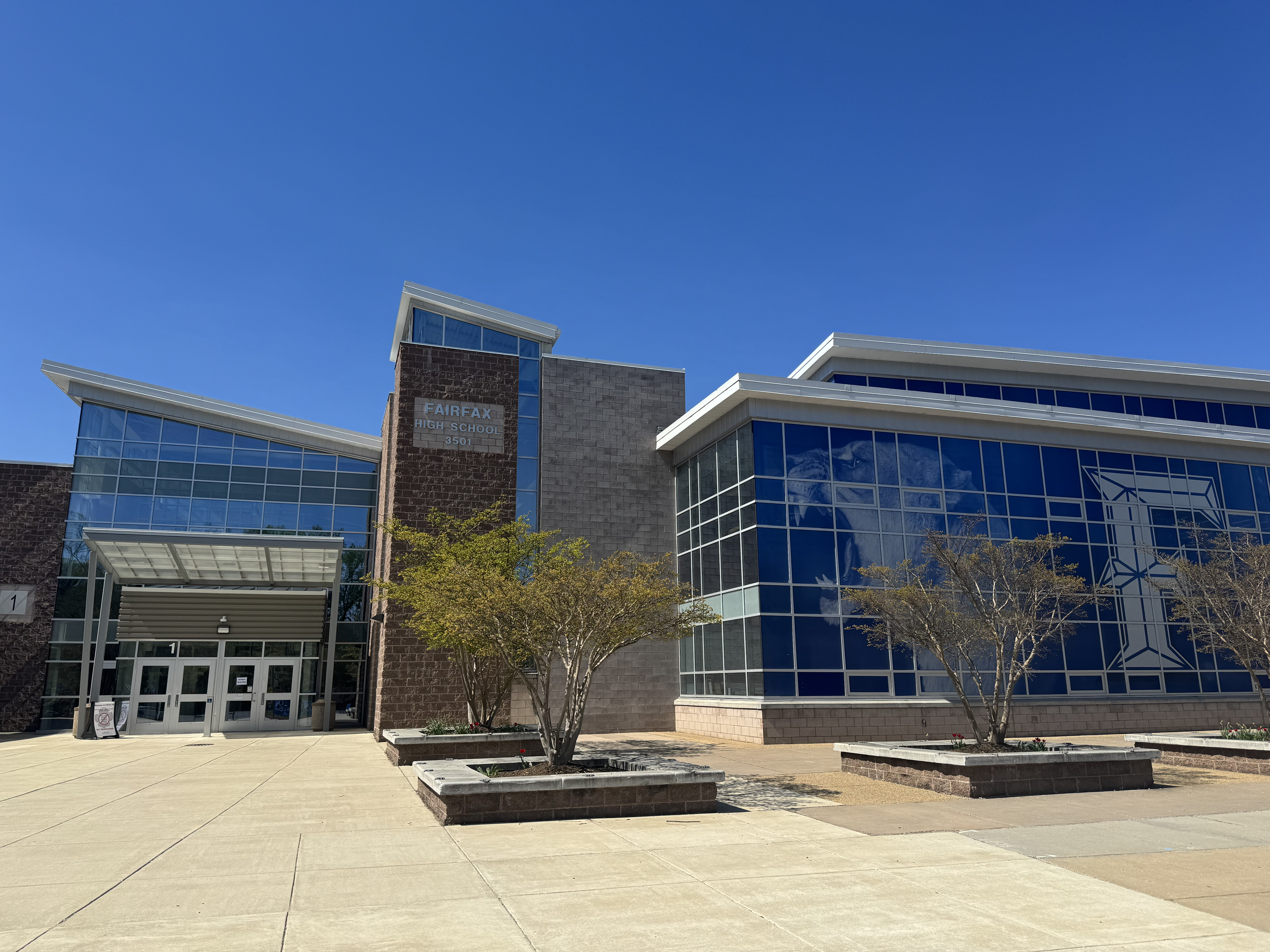
- Fairfax High School in 2026

Location
- 3501 Lion Run; Fairfax, Virginia 22030; 38.860°N 77.286°W

Information
- School type: Public, high school
- Founded: 1935; 1973 (relocated)
- School district: Fairfax County Public Schools
- NCES District ID: 5101260
- Superintendent: Michelle C. Reid
- NCES School ID: 510126000463
- Principal: Georgina Aye
- Staff: 128.5 (FTE)
- Grades: 9–12
- Enrollment: 2,404 (2024-25)
- Student to teacher ratio: 17.19
- Language: English
- Campus: Suburban
- Colors: Blue, grey, & white ██
- Mascot: Lion
- Newspaper: The Fair Facts
- Yearbook: The Sampler
- Feeder schools: Katherine Johnson Middle School
- Athletic conferences: Patriot District; Class 6A Region C
- Website: https://fairfaxhs.fcps.edu/

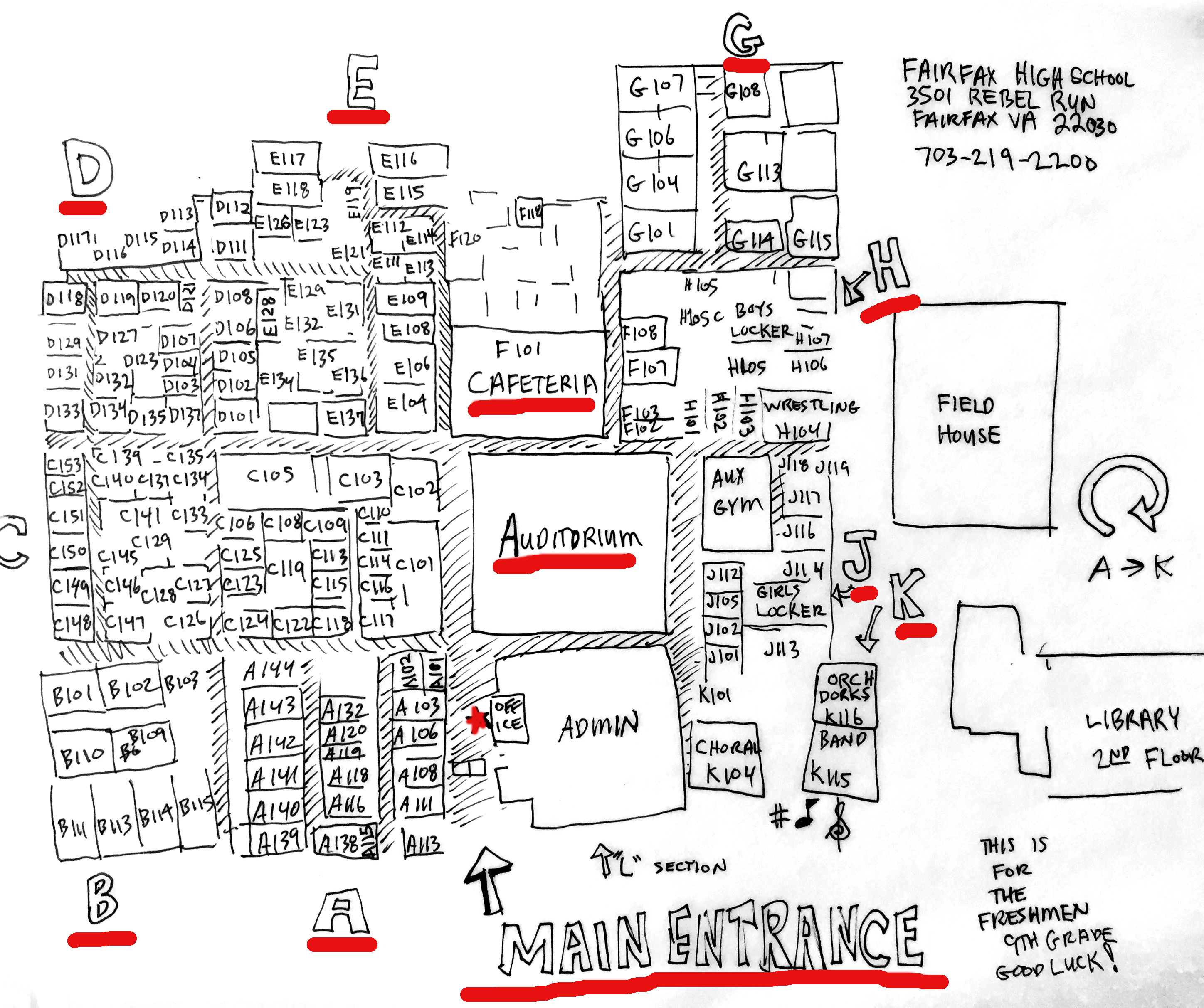
School map

Fairfax High School (FHS) is a public high school in the Eastern United States, located in Fairfax, Virginia, a suburb west of Washington, D.C. in Northern Virginia. The school is owned by the City of Fairfax, but is operated by Fairfax County Public Schools under a contractual agreement between it and Fairfax County.

The school building, which opened in 1973, is located on Blenheim Boulevard in eastern Fairfax. In 2007, FHS underwent a $54 million renovation designed by architectural firm BerryRio. Renovations began in October 2005 and added 86,500 sq ft (8,040 m^{2}). of classroom space. Student numbers have increased at such a high rate that four trailers have been installed.

The previous school building and campus, which existed from 1935 to 1973, on Fairfax Boulevard was part of George Mason University for a time and then Paul VI Catholic High School from 1983 to 2020. It is now a retail space.

== Academics ==
67% of students participate in Advanced Placement (AP) courses, with 56% of students passing at least one AP exam. The graduation rate is 96%.

=== Test scores ===
Fairfax High School is a fully accredited high school based on the Standards of Learning (SOL) tests in Virginia. FHS is performing above the state median on all SOL assessments including 91% in Reading, 88% in writing, 79% in math, and 79% in science. The average SAT score in 2009–2010 for FHS was 1657 on a 2400 scale. The average SAT score in 2018 was 1192 on the 1600 scale.

=== Rankings ===
In 2010–2011, Fairfax High School was ranked the nation's 201st best high school. In 2019, FHS was ranked as Virginia's 33rd best high school.

== Demographics ==
As of the 2021-2022 school year, Fairfax High School's student body was 34% White, 23% Asian, 24% Hispanic, 9% Black, 0.2% Native American, and 5% other.

== Curriculum ==
Fairfax High School currently follows the Virginia Department of Education curriculum. The school also hosts Fairfax Academy: School for the Arts, which includes classes such as graphic design and photography. The Academy also features Korean and Chinese language education. The school has a strong AVID Program, a Reward and Remediation Program, and Honors programs in all areas.

== 1985 Johnny Reb controversy ==
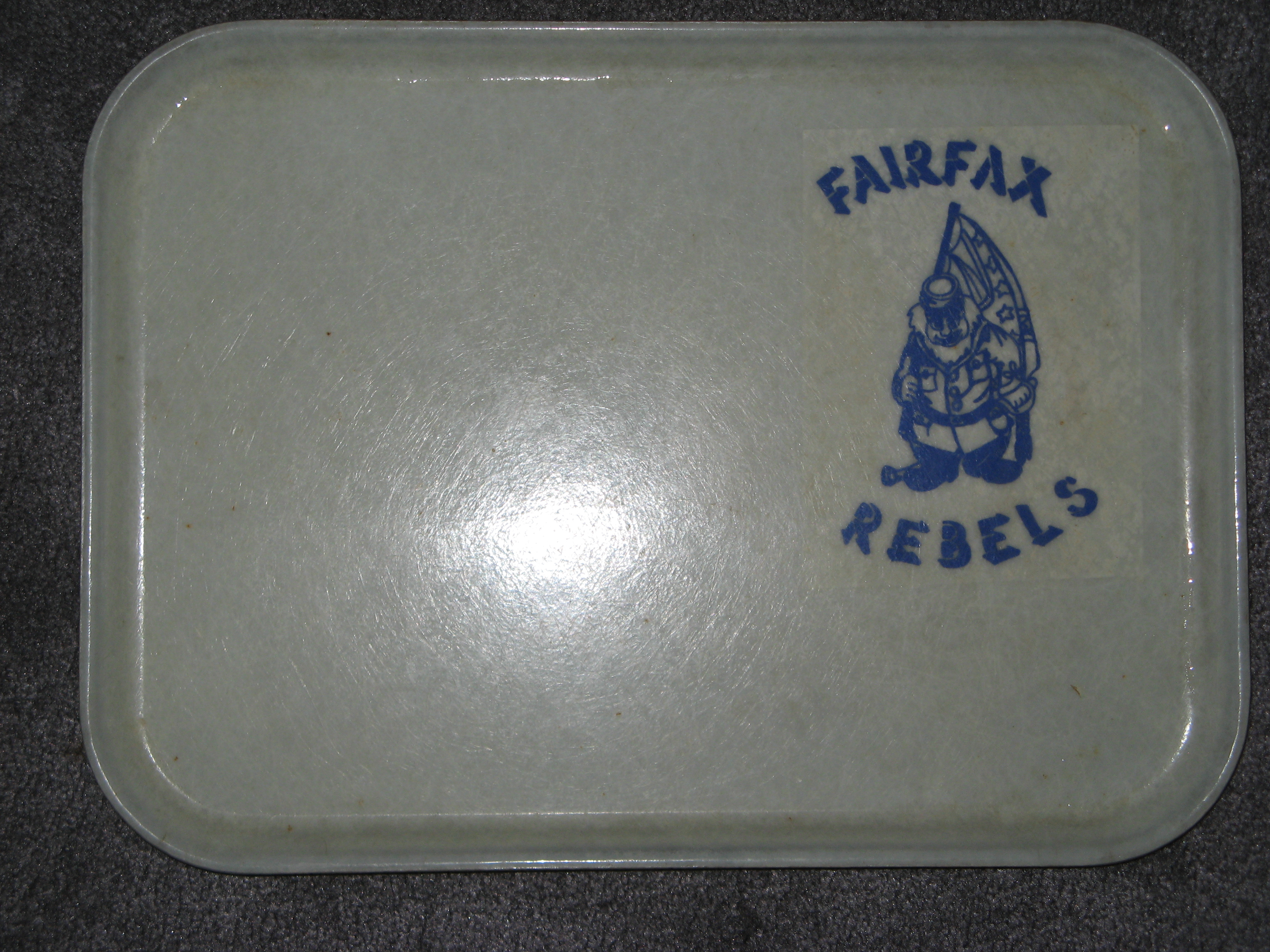
The Johnny Reb lunch tray used at Fairfax High School during the 1970s

The Fairfax High School mascot was a caricature of a Confederate soldier known as "Johnny Reb". Because of complaints from students and parents throughout the history of the new campus, and at the suggestion of the school's Minority Achievement Task Force, principal Harry Holsinger removed the Johnny Reb symbol in 1985. Student protests, rallies, and a lawsuit followed, which challenged the principal's actions as violating the First Amendment guarantees of free speech. In Crosby v. Holsinger, 852 F.2d 801 (4th Cir. 1988), the 4th Circuit Court of Appeals affirmed the federal district court decision in favor of the principal. After Johnny Reb was removed, the mascot was a set of crossed swords, and an unusual mascot, that resembled a ball of lint, called the Rebel Rouser. In 2003, the school voted on a new physical mascot while keeping the same nickname, a lion (Rebel-lion). In June 2020, "Rebel" was dropped entirely, and the team name became the Fairfax "Lions".

== Extracurricular activities ==
=== Chorus ===
The Fairfax High School Choral Department includes five ensembles divided by skill level and requires an audition. A beginning group, Women's Concert Choir, is available for freshman women only. Intermediate groups, Men's Ensemble and Select Women's Choir which are made available to men in grades 9-12 and women in grades 10-12. The two auditioned advanced choral groups, Bel Canto, a group of select women in grades 10-12 and Voce, a selective mixed ensemble for students in 10-12th grades. The choral department also has four extracurricular groups the Show Choir, Fairfax Fame, Malebox, and Rebel Treble, an auditioned student-led mixed a Cappella ensemble. Approximately 110 students participate in the Fairfax choirs.

Fairfax choral students also participate in District Chorus, Virginia Honors Choir and All-State Chorus, as well as a regional competition trip in the spring. Choral groups perform music of many periods and styles and develop musicianship through vocal technique, sight-reading, and music theory. The choir program holds several concerts over the course of the year, the largest, Spring Show is held in early May and a Cabaret is held in the early winter. In addition to the choral concerts held at FHS, students have performed in the Fairfax musicals, at the Fairfax Festival of Lights, George Mason basketball games, corporate parties, Fairfax Corner, the New York City Festivals of Music, Heritage Festival in Atlanta, Georgia, the Smoky Mountain Music Festival in Gatlinburg, Tennessee and Festival Disney.

=== Band ===
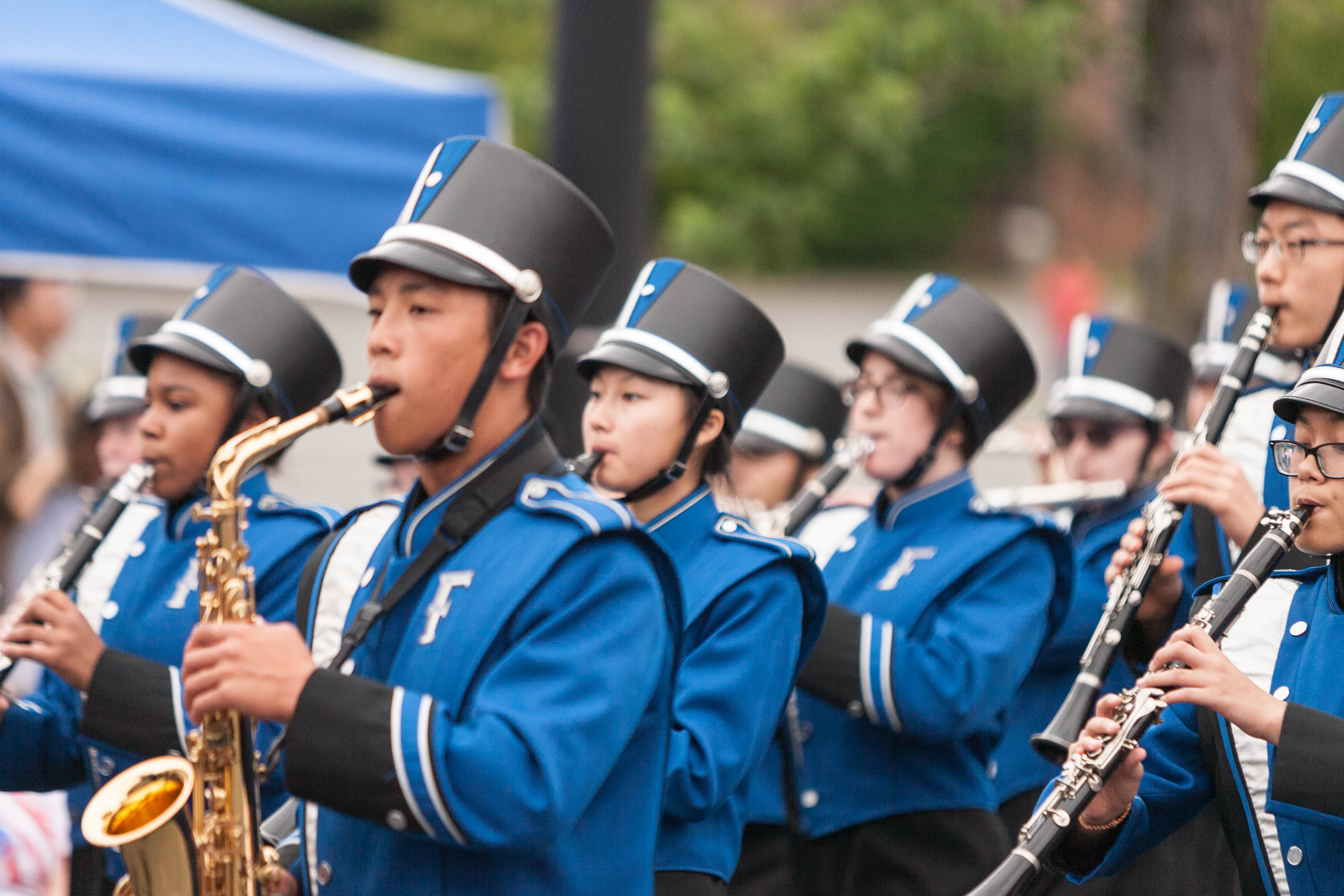
Fairfax High School's marching band performing on Independence Day in July 2016

Fairfax High School has a strong band program, including a marching band which has won numerous championships. Included in the Rebel Band is the Fairfax High School Drumline, which placed third in the Atlantic Indoor Association (AIA) championships in North Carolina in 2006, third in 2010, and second in 2011. In 2009, they performed in Dayton, Ohio for Winter Guard International and received 4th place in their preliminary group and 18th in semifinals. Overall, they placed 18th out of 60 groups. Other teams that accompany the Band program are the Fall Guard (competes with the marching band) and the Winterguard (competes separately). The Fairfax High School Band was under the direction of Ms. Meghan Benson, and won second place at a band competition at the Smoky Mountain Music Festival, in Gatlinburg, Tennessee in the spring of 2008. The Marching Band won third place in the local Fourth of July Parade independence Day celebration, and was awarded $2000 in 2008.

At the end of the 2008 Marching Rebel season, the band received a 1- Superior rating at the VBODA Championships. The Fairfax High School Band Program received a superior rating at both Marching and Symphonic Band festivals making it eligible to receive the award of Virginia State Honor Band for the first time in the school's 75-year history. The band has repeated the feat every year since. Because of the work of the Marching Band and Symphonic Band along with the work of the orchestral and choral departments, Fairfax was able to earn the title of Blue Ribbon School for the performing arts, which is achieved by Superior ratings at VBODA state marching festival, and a Superior rating for each of the top performing groups at District Festival. At the competition on their spring trip in the year 2009 to Orlando, Florida, the Rebel band placed second in its class by a margin of less than one point and received the Silver Award Overall in Festival Disney.

=== Marching Lions ===
In its 2009 season, the Marching Lions won all of the competitions they competed in and got awards for quality music and general effect. They performed a show called Heroes, Gods and Mythical Creatures and performed at the Herndon USSBA Regionals, the Oakton Classic, and the James Madison University Parade of Champions. The Rebels placed first in Class 3A in the Herndon Showcase of Bands without proper uniforms which were destroyed in a flood due to a heating malfunction, also received first at the Oakton Classic. At the final major competition, the band placed 1st in Class 3A with a score of 84.75. At the VBODA state marching festival the rebels received a superior rating and got straight 1s from all of the judges. The symphonic band received straight 1s the following spring to complete the Virginia Honor Band title.

The 2010 season was also a great success with the show "Nautilus", with the Marching Rebels winning 2nd place in class 3A at the Herndon USSBA regionals, falling short of Thomas Jefferson High School for Science and Technology by a fraction of a point, first place at the Oakton Classic, first place at the James Madison University parade of Champions, and straight 1s from all of the judges at the VBODA state marching festival. The symphonic band received straight firsts the following spring to complete the Virginia Honor Band title.

The new band director was welcomed to Fairfax Band in the 2011–2012 school year. The Fairfax Marching Rebels won first place in all competitions, including the Esprit de Corps award issued by the United States Navy, awarded to the band with the most professionalism and patriotism. In the 2012 season, the band went to numerous competitions and won 1st place in almost all they performed in. The show, "Metamorphosis", was performed at James Madison University Parade of Champions, and won 1st place with a score of over 90 points. The Fairfax Marching Band went to two Bands of America competitions and respectively won 4th and 6th place in the finals round of the competitions. They have won the VBODA state marching festival with a superior rating and straight 1s from all the judges.

As of the fall of 2022, a new band director was welcomed to the Fairfax Band Program, Noah Freeman. In 2022, the Marching Pride performed their halftime show "Waves" at James Madison University's Parade of Champions, earning first place in Class 5A. In 2023, the Fairfax High School Marching Band changed its name from the Marching Pride to the Marching Lions. They performed their halftime show "Witches Heart" and placed 1st in group 3A at the VMBC State Championships at Liberty University. They placed 12th in their finals performance. In 2024, the Marching Lions' halftime show was "The Myth of Sisyphus". They attended the VMBC State Championship and scored 4th in group 5 with a score of 91.550. They went on to perform at finals and placed 11th overall. In 2025, the Marching Lions performed "Liquid Gold". They attended the Bands of America Mid-Atlantic Regional Championship at The University of Delaware. They earned 6th place overall in their prelims run, then qualified for finals and won 7th place overall.

=== Orchestra ===
The orchestra consists of four different levels: Beginning, Intermediate, Philharmonic, and Chamber.

=== Theatre ===
The FX Players is the Drama Club at Fairfax High School. The FX Players won the state title at the VHSL One-Act Competition in 2008.

Fairfax has an orchestra pit that can be covered and uncovered, but it is normally kept in the house floor position due to safety concerns. The pit sinks six feet below the stage.

=== It's Academic ===
The "It's Academic" team participates in quiz bowl tournaments throughout Virginia, Maryland, and Washington, D.C., including NBC 4's It's Academic game show formerly hosted by Mac McGarry.

In 1968, Fairfax High School became the first Virginia high school to win the Washington metropolitan area championship. In January 2009, the school placed second in the Concorde District at the VHSL AAA District Tournament.

== Feeder patterns ==
Daniels Run Elementary School, Greenbriar East Elementary School, Willow Springs Elementary School, Eagle View Elementary School, Providence Elementary School, and Mosaic Elementary School all feed into Katherine Johnson Middle School, which feeds into Fairfax High School. Some students from Rocky Run Middle School also attend Fairfax.

== Athletics ==
Fairfax's teams are known as ithe Lions, and the athletic teams currently compete in the AAA Patriot District and Northern Region. The closest high schools to Fairfax are Oakton High School (1.9 miles (3 km) north) and W.T. Woodson High School (2.4 miles (4 km) south). Fairfax's main rival is nearby W.T. Woodson.

The school has brought home the state championship for cheerleading twice, in 2009 and 2013. The school placed second in 2000, 2008, 2011, and 2012.

The school's other state championships are for boys' gymnastics in 2000, girls' gymnastics in 2022, swim and dive in 2006, and field hockey in 2022.

== Notable alumni ==
- Simone Askew, first captain of the Corps of Cadets, United States Military Academy and Rhodes Scholarship recipient
- Pam Baughman-Cornell, former U.S. Women's Soccer national team player
- Richard Beyer, sculptor and World War II veteran
- Brian Buchanan, former professional baseball player, Minnesota Twins, New York Mets, and San Diego Padres, and general manager, Kansas City Chiefs
- Sam Champion, former weatherman, ABC's Good Morning America
- David Deptula, USAF general, class of 1969
- L.M. Elliott, author, Under a War-Torn Sky
- Christina Hendricks, actress, Mad Men and Good Girls
- William J. Howell, 54th speaker of the Virginia House of Delegates
- Jeremy Jeffress, former professional baseball player, Chicago Cubs, Kansas City Royals, Milwaukee Brewers, and Texas Rangers
- Craig Mello, Nobel Prize for Physiology or Medicine recipient
- Jason Charles Miller, vocalist and guitarist, Godhead
- Chap Petersen, Virginia state senator
- Harold Arthur Poling, former chairman and CEO, Ford Motor Company
- Bill Pulsipher, former professional baseball player, Boston Red Sox, Chicago White Sox, New York Mets, and St. Louis Cardinals
- Nicholas Rasmussen, former director, National Counterterrorism Center
- Tony Rojas, college football linebacker, Penn State Nittany Lions
- Jack Rust, former Virginia delegate
- Owen Schmitt, former professional football player, Oakland Raiders, Philadelphia Eagles, and Seattle Seahawks
- Nick Scott, professional football player, Carolina Panthers
- Fred Talbot, former professional baseball player, Chicago White Sox, Kansas City Royals, and New York Yankees
- Pierre J. Thuot, NASA astronaut
- Steven Ward, television producer and host, Tough Love on VH-1

== Former principals ==
Principal	Years
Georgina Aye	2022–present
Erin Lenart	2018–2021
David Goldfarb	2009–2018
Scott Brabrand	2005–2009
Linda L. Thomson	2002–2005
Lillian Lowery	1999–2002
Donald Weinheimer	1988–1999
Harry Holsinger	1983–1988
Joan Curcio	1981–1983
Clarance P. Drayer	1977–1981
Robert Tabor	1973–1977
