= Mike Imoh =

American gridiron football player (born 1984)

Profile
- Position: Running back

Personal information
- Born: July 21, 1984 (age 42); Fairfax, Virginia, U.S.
- Listed height: 5 ft 6 in (1.68 m)
- Listed weight: 195 lb (88 kg)

Career information
- High school: Robinson (Fairfax, Virginia)
- College: Virginia Tech

Career history
- 2007–2008: Montreal Alouettes

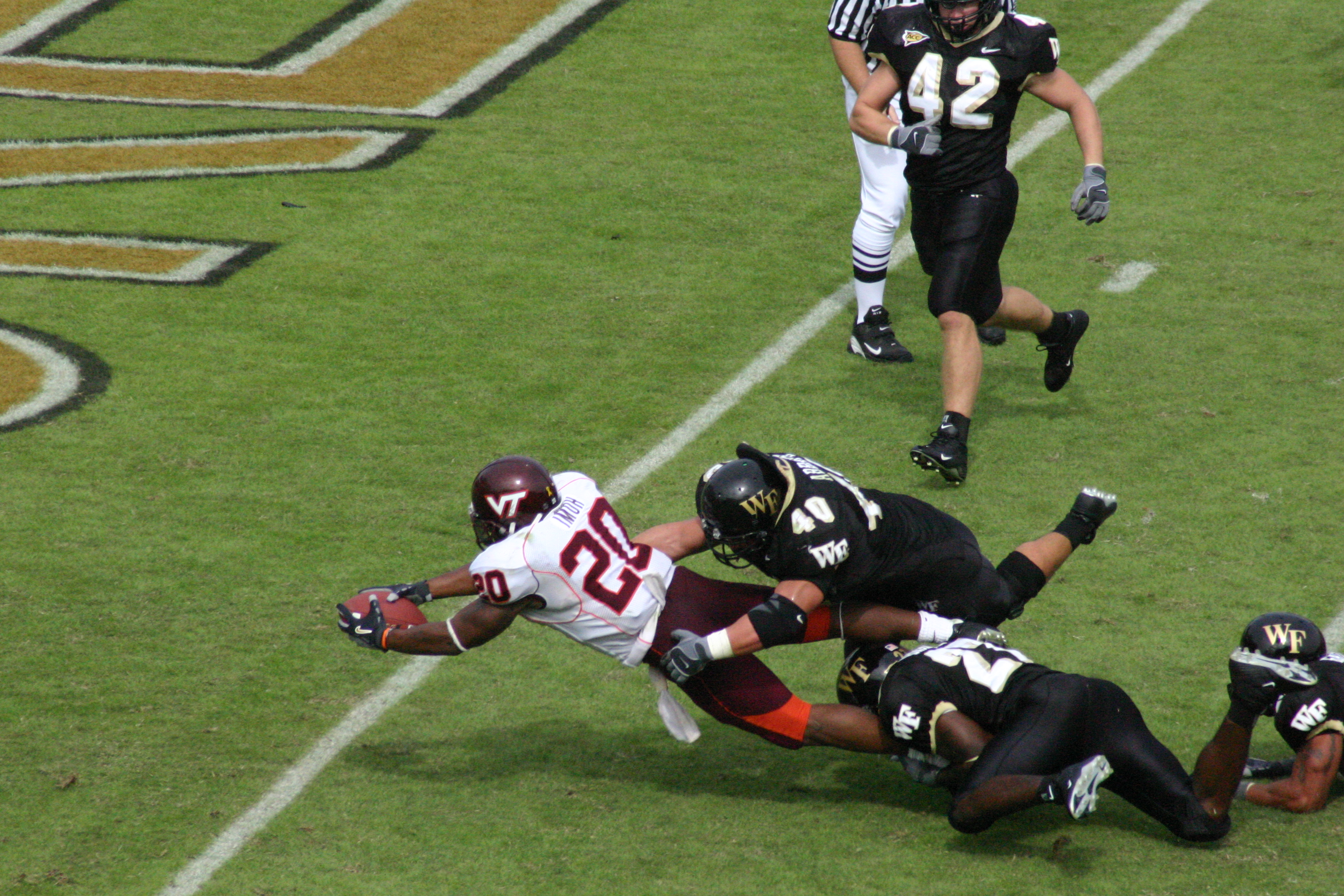
Mike Imoh diving for a touchdown against Wake Forest

Michael U. Imoh (born July 21, 1984) is a former professional football player, a running back for the Montreal Alouettes of the Canadian Football League.

== Early life ==
Born and raised in Fairfax, Virginia, a suburb southwest of Washington, D.C., Imoh attended Robinson Secondary School and starred as a tailback in football and a sprinter in track. As a senior, he led the Rams to the 6A state championship in football in the fall of 2001 and enrolled at Virginia Tech in Blacksburg in 2002.

== College career ==
Imoh was moved to receiver in his first two seasons at Virginia Tech, as the Hokies had lost all-Big East receiver André Davis to the National Football League, and were in desperate need of help at flanker.

In 2003, Imoh became the first Hokie to return a kickoff for a touchdown since 1992 with his 91-yard return against Connecticut. Imoh finished the 2003 season as the top kick returner in the Big East and the third highest kick returner nationally.

Following the 2003 season, Imoh and two teammates – Marcus Vick and Brendan Hill – were convicted of contributing to the delinquency of a minor for allegedly serving alcohol to three underage girls. Imoh was suspended for three games following the incident.

As a junior in 2004, Imoh moved back to tailback. Following his suspension, he quickly won the starting job. Against North Carolina, Imoh broke the Virginia Tech single game rushing record set the previous year by Kevin Jones. Due to a record keeping error with the official statistics, Imoh was originally credited with only 236 yards – five short of Jones' total – but Tech's radio statistician noticed a discrepancy between his notes and the official total and was able to have the error corrected.

Preceded by Kevin Jones	Virginia Tech single-game rushing record 2004–2008 (243 yards)	Succeeded by Darren Evans
