= James Dexter =

American football player (born 1973)

No. 64
- Positions: Guard, tackle

Personal information
- Born: March 3, 1973 (age 53); Fort Ord, California, U.S.
- Listed height: 6 ft 7 in (2.01 m)
- Listed weight: 319 lb (145 kg)

Career information
- High school: West Springfield (VA)
- College: South Carolina
- NFL draft: 1996: 5th round, 137th overall pick

Career history
- Arizona Cardinals (1996–1999); Carolina Panthers (2000)

Awards and highlights
- Second-team All-SEC (1995)

Career NFL statistics
- Games played: 49
- Games started: 33
- Fumble recoveries: 3
- Stats at Pro Football Reference

James Roland Dexter (born March 3, 1973) is an American former professional football player who was an offensive tackle for five seasons with the Arizona Cardinals and Carolina Panthers of the National Football League (NFL). He played college football for the South Carolina Gamecocks and was selected in the fifth round of the 1996 NFL draft with the 137th overall pick.
