= West Springfield High School (Virginia) =

High school in West Springfield, Virginia

Coordinates: 38°47′10″N 77°14′25″W

Location
- 6100 Rolling Road; Springfield, Virginia 22152

Information
- School type: Public, high school
- Motto: Dream Big | Work Hard | Be Proud | Spartan Strong
- Founded: 1966
- School district: Fairfax County Public Schools
- Principal: Shannon Matheny
- Staff: 196.45 (on an FTE basis)
- Grades: 9–12
- Enrollment: 2,799 (2024-2025)
- Student to teacher ratio: 13.99
- Language: English
- Campus: Suburban
- Colors: Blue and orange ██
- Mascot: Spartan
- Feeder schools: Washington Irving Middle School; Lake Braddock Secondary School
- Athletic conferences: Patriot District; Northern Region
- Website: Official Site

West Springfield High School is a public high school located in Fairfax County, Virginia, at 6100 Rolling Road, and is part of the Fairfax County Public Schools system. West Springfield (often referred to as WSHS) enrolls approximately 2,750 students from grades 9–12, ranked 10th within Virginia.

The facility has a Springfield postal address and is physically within the West Springfield census-designated place.

== History ==
West Springfield High School was established in September 1966 to serve the growing suburban population of Fairfax County, Virginia. The first principal was S. John Davis, who later became the superintendent of Fairfax County Public Schools and was appointed as Virginia's state Superintendent of Public Instruction in 1979.

In 1988, a renovation project was initiated in response to student advocacy for improved school facilities. Construction was completed in 1991, adding new classrooms in the courtyard and remodeling the library, auditorium, Spartan Hall, and the Career Center. During this period, the school newspaper, The Oracle, featured student opinions both supporting and criticizing the renovations due to the disruptions caused.

A comprehensive $75 million renovation began in 2012, with construction starting in the summer of 2016. The project concluded in September 2019 and included the addition of a new dance studio, updated classrooms, a redesigned front office, an open and flexible library space, an expanded gymnasium, a new third-floor science department, and a renovated cafeteria. The exterior and side entrances were also modernized.

== Demographics ==
According to the National Center for Education Statistics, the student enrollment at West Springfield High School for the 2023–24 academic year reflected the diverse population of the surrounding community in Fairfax County, Virginia. The student body was composed of:

- 47.9% White (non-Hispanic)
- 18.2% Hispanic or Latino
- 13.3% Asian
- 12.1% Black or African American
- 7.5% Two or more races, Native American, or other ethnic backgrounds

This demographic distribution reflects both the historical residential patterns of the Springfield area and broader trends in the Washington, D.C. metropolitan region, which is known for its cultural and ethnic diversity.

== Academic performance ==
=== State assessments and student proficiency ===
West Springfield High School students consistently perform above state averages on Virginia’s Standards of Learning (SOL) assessments. For the 2023–24 academic year:

- Reading: Approximately 77% of students demonstrated proficiency in reading, with a 100% overall pass rate.
- Mathematics: Around 76% of students reached proficiency in mathematics, with a 97% overall pass rate.

=== SAT and ACT performance ===
- SAT: The average composite SAT score for West Springfield students is 1270.
- ACT: The average ACT composite score is 28.

== Academic programs and courses ==
=== Advanced Placement program ===
West Springfield High School offers a comprehensive Advanced Placement (AP) program designed to prepare students for postsecondary academic success. As of the 2024–2025 school year, the school offers 23 AP courses across core disciplines including English, science, mathematics, history, government, world languages, and the arts.

According to U.S. News & World Report, the AP participation rate at West Springfield High School is 62%, with 73% of participating students earning a score of 3 or higher on at least one AP exam.

The school also features early AP opportunities such as AP Human Geography (which can fulfill a World History and Geography requirement) and AP Seminar, which may count toward the Grade 10 English credit requirement.

=== Dual enrollment and Career & Technical Education ===
West Springfield offers several Dual enrollment (DE) courses in partnership with Northern Virginia Community College (NOVA), enabling students to earn both high school and college credits simultaneously.

The school provides Career and Technical Education (CTE) programs in areas such as business and information technology, family and consumer sciences, and technology education, designed to prepare students for industry certifications and the workforce.

=== World Languages ===
West Springfield High School offers instruction in Spanish, French, and Latin as part of its World Languages Department.

=== Visual and Performing Arts ===
Students can enroll in courses in visual arts, fine arts, theater, choir, orchestra, band, guitar.

=== Special education services ===
West Springfield provides a variety of services for students with disabilities, including Individualized Education Programs (IEPs), 504 Plans, and access to inclusive classrooms and specialized instruction.

== Athletics ==
West Springfield's school mascot is a Spartan soldier, and school colors are orange and blue. The school competes in the Patriot District, which is in the 6A Region C (Occoquan Region) of the Virginia High School League (VHSL). The following sports are offered:

- Baseball
- Basketball (boys and girls)
- Cheerleading
- Cross Country (boys and girls)
- Dance Team (non-VHSL sport)
- Field Hockey
- Football
- Golf
- Gymnastics
- Indoor Track and Field
- Lacrosse (boys and girls)
- Soccer (boys and girls)
- Softball
- Swim and Dive (boys and girls)
- Tennis (boys and girls)
- Track and Field (boys and girls)
- Volleyball (boys and girls)
- Wrestling
- Crew (non VHSL sport)

=== Girls' Volleyball ===
The West Springfield High School Girls' Volleyball team won their first-ever Virginia's Class Six State Championship in 2025, along with other notable achievements:

- Occoquan Regionals in 2025, 2024
- Patriot Region in 2025, 2024

=== Boys Indoor Track ===
The West Springfield High School boys indoor track team won Virginia state championships in 1996, 1998, 2023, and 2025.

=== Varsity softball ===
The West Springfield High School varsity softball team won the Virginia AAA State Softball Championship in 1983.

=== Debate and Forensics ===
The school participates in the Washington Arlington Catholic Forensics League (WACFL), which hosts tournaments throughout the academic year for schools in the Diocese of Arlington and surrounding areas. West Springfield students compete in a variety of events, including Lincoln-Douglas Debate, Public Forum Debate, Student Congress, Original Oratory, Extemporaneous Speaking, and Dramatic Interpretation.

In addition to WACFL, students also attend invitational tournaments hosted by prestigious universities along the East Coast. These include:

- The Yale Invitational at Yale University
- The Villiger Tournament at Saint Joseph's University
- The Patriot Games Classic at George Mason University

These tournaments are part of the broader national circuit and often serve as qualifiers for major events such as the National Speech & Debate Association (NSDA) and Catholic Forensic League (CFL) Grand Nationals.

West Springfield’s competitive success includes multiple state titles:

- The **Forensics Team** won its first **Virginia Group AAA state championship** in **2006**, and captured the title again in **2009**.
- The **Debate Team** won the **Group AAA state title** in **2009**, showcasing excellence across events like Policy Debate and Lincoln-Douglas.

=== Dance team ===
The West Springfield High School Dance Team (WSDT) has received national recognition for its hip-hop performances and competitive achievements.

In 2010, WSDT won the National Dance Alliance (NDA) Medium Varsity Hip-Hop National Championship. The team went on to win six consecutive NDA Large Varsity Hip-Hop National Championships from 2011 to 2016, becoming seven-time NDA champions. In 2013, the team was honored by the Fairfax County Board of Supervisors for winning its fourth straight national title.

In 2018, WSDT won the Dance Team Union (DTU) National Championship in the Hip-Hop division.

In 2011, WSDT appeared on Season 6 of America's Got Talent after being selected as one of the top 12 YouTube audition acts. They advanced to the semifinals before being eliminated. The team’s unique choreography and professionalism received widespread praise during the competition.

In 2019, WSDT became the first public high school team to compete on NBC’s World of Dance. They auditioned in New York City and were selected to appear on Season 3 of the show. The team advanced to the Duels round before being eliminated.

=== Varsity baseball ===
The West Springfield High School Spartans baseball program has captured four state championships: the Virginia AAA titles in 1991, 1998, and 2010, and the VHSL Class 6 title in 2018.

The Spartan Baseball motto is "Season est de Tempore, tamen virtus Traditionis sustinet" (From Season to Season, the Tradition Continues).

=== Cheerleading ===
The Spartan Cheerleading squad won the fall AAA state title in 2003. There was also a winter champion as the sport was moved from winter to fall that year.

=== Boys' Tennis ===
The school won the doubles state championship in 2022.

=== Cross-country ===
The boys' cross country team secured the Virginia AAA State Championships in 1989, 1993, 1994,1995, and 2019.

=== Track and field ===
The boys' track and field team won the AAA State Championships in both indoor and outdoor track in 1996, and the indoor title again in 1998.

The girls' cross country team won the Class 6 state championship in 2022. In 2023, the team successfully defended their title.

=== Swim and dive ===
The West Springfield girls' swim and dive team won the Virginia AAA State Championships in 1995, 1996, and 1997.

The boys' swim and dive team won the AAA state titles in 1993 and 1994.

=== Lacrosse ===
West Springfield High School fields competitive varsity teams in both boys' and girls' lacrosse, participating as members of the Virginia High School League (VHSL) in Class 6, Region C.

=== Boys' and Girls' Soccer ===
The girls' soccer team became the first in Virginia high school history to win back-to-back state titles, claiming the AAA championship in 1991 and 1992.

The boys' soccer team won Virginia AAA State championships in 1996, 1998, 2000, 2023, and 2025.

=== Crew ===
In 1989, during the team's inaugural year, the men's varsity eight secured the Northern Virginia Championship on the Fountainhead Reservoir.

In 2018, the girls' crew team won the Virginia state championship title.

The women's 2nd varsity four (W-2-4) crew won state championships in both 2023 and 2024.

In 2024, the boys' team made school history by winning the total team points trophy and the top varsity eight race at the Virginia Scholastic Rowing Championships.

== Scholastic Bowl ==
West Springfield High School's Scholastic Bowl team participates in quizzes, including the televised quiz show It's Academic. In January 2024, the team competed on an episode of It's Academic aired on WETA PBS. In the 2016–2017 season, the team won the Patriot Conference Scholastic Bowl Championship.

== Music ==
West Springfield High School offers a comprehensive music program, including band, choir, orchestra, and guitar, serving nearly one-third of the student body.

=== Band ===
The school's band program comprises multiple ensembles: Wind Symphony, Symphonic Band, Concert Band, Jazz Ensemble, Marching Band (Marching Spartans), and various chamber groups. The Wind Symphony is the premier concert ensemble and has performed at prestigious events, including the Virginia Music Educators Association (VMEA) Conference and the Music for All National Festival in Indianapolis.

The Marching Spartans have won multiple U.S. Scholastic Band Association (USSBA) Group 5 (A and Open classes) championships, and have been recognized as Virginia and All-States champions since 2015. Furthermore, the Marching Spartans received an overall superior rating at the Virginia Band and Orchestra Directors Association (VBODA) North Central Marching Assessment in 2024.

The band has earned the title of Honor Band in 2000, 2006–2009, 2012–2020, 2022, and 2023. In 2024 the band was barred from being adjudicated at the VBODA assessment due to controversy over one of their pieces being ungraded by the Commonwealth of Virginia.

=== Orchestra ===
The orchestra program includes Concert Orchestra, Symphonic Orchestra, and Chamber Orchestra. The Symphonic Orchestra performed as an honor orchestra at the 2005 VMEA Conference. The Chamber Orchestra, established in 2008, caters to the school's most advanced string players.

=== Guitar ===
WSHS offers a robust guitar program with six sections, including two concert Guitar Ensembles and a Jazz Guitar Combo. The Jazz Guitar Combo has performed at various events, such as the FCPS annual Retirement Ceremony in 2023.

=== Choir ===
The choral program features four ensembles: Cantus (un-auditioned treble choir), Spartones (un-auditioned tenor/bass choir), Bel Canto (auditioned treble choir), and Madrigals (auditioned mixed ensemble). In November 2022, the Madrigals were selected to perform at the VMEA Conference in Richmond.

== Theatre ==
The West Springfield Theatre Department has taken part in the Cappies Critics program since it began in 2002. The department is known for its high-quality shows that have garnered many positive reviews. In 2013, West Springfield's production of "The Diary of Anne Frank" received a Cappie for Best Lead Actress in a Play; and in the same year, won the VHSL state one-act competition for its show "The Other Room." In 2010, "The Lion, The Witch, and the Wardrobe" won a Cappie for Best Make-up. In 2022 West Springfield competed in the VHSL Theatre competition with "A Ballad of Dice & Disaster" and it would go on to place 3rd at the District Level, 1st at the Regional Level, and 3rd at the State Level for Class 6 Competition.

West Springfield's 2024 production of Sweeney Todd School Edition won several Cappies Critics awards, including for special effects and/or technology, hair and make-up, lighting, orchestra, ensemble in a musical, lead actor in a male role in a musical, song, and musical.

=== Student publications ===
West Springfield High School supports a robust student journalism program, featuring three primary student-run publications: The Oracle (newspaper), The Olympian (yearbook), and The Symposium (literary and art magazine). These publications are produced by students enrolled in Journalism and Photojournalism courses, with content decisions made independently by the student staff.

In 2023, West Springfield High School was recognized as a recipient of the First Amendment Press Freedom Award by the Journalism Education Association, National Scholastic Press Association, and Quill and Scroll Society. This award honors schools that actively support, teach, and protect First Amendment rights and responsibilities of students and teachers, emphasizing student-run media where students make all final decisions of content. The Fairfax County Board of Supervisors formally recognized West Springfield High School for this achievement in April 2023.

The Oracle, established in 1966, is the school's award-winning student newspaper. It operates as a designated public forum, with students making all content decisions without prior review by school officials. In 2022, The Oracle earned a First Class rating in the Virginia High School League (VHSL) Media Championship's Newspaper Division, while its online counterpart received a Second Class rating in the Online News Division.

The Olympian is the school's yearbook, produced by students in Photojournalism classes. In 2022, it achieved a First Class rating in the VHSL Media Championship's Yearbook Division.

The Symposium is West Springfield High School's literary and art magazine, showcasing student-submitted writing, music, and art. Submissions are reviewed anonymously by the staff, and the magazine is distributed annually alongside The Olympian. In 2022, The Symposium received a First Class rating in the VHSL Media Championship's Magazine Division.

== Notable alumni ==
- Dave Albo, Republican politician
- Becky Ann Baker, actress
- Louis Bayard, author
- Benjamin Bryant (Class of 1994, attended 1992-1993), broadcaster, writer, and Emmy-nominated filmmaker
- Greg Calloway (Class of 2000), reality show winner
- Brian Carroll (Class of 2000), professional soccer player
- Jeff Carroll (Class of 2001), professional soccer player
- Mike Caussin (Class of 2005), professional football player
- James Dexter (Class of 1991), professional football player
- Lars Eckenrode (Class of 2013), professional soccer player
- Patrick Forrester (Class of 1975), astronaut
- J (South Korean singer) (Class of 1996), Korean-American singer based in South Korea
- Jeremy Kapinos (Class of 2002), professional football player 2007–2012
- Sharif Karie (Class of 1997), middle-distance running track runner
- Kara Lawson (Class of 1999), professional basketball player, Gold Medalist 2008 Olympics, ESPN personality
- Laura (Cook) Lenderman (Class of 1989), US Air Force General
- Tony Muskett (Class of 2020), college football player
- Bryn Renner (Class of 2009), professional football player
- Joe Saunders (Class of 1999), professional baseball player
- Mohammed Seisay (Class of 2008), professional football player
- Ryan Speier (Class of 1996), professional baseball player
- Virginia Thrasher (Class of 2015), professional sports shooter, Gold Medalist 2016 Olympics
- Bobby Wahl (Class of 2010), baseball player
