= Scott Urick =

American lacrosse player and coach

- Born: July 15, 1977 (age 47)
- Nationality: American
- Height: 5 ft 10 in (1.78 m)
- Weight: 191 pounds (87 kg)
- Position: Attack
- NLL draft: 26th overall, 2000; Rochester Knighthawks
- MLL team Former teams: Washington Bayhawks; New Jersey Pride
- NCAA team: Georgetown University
- Pro career: 2001–2009

Scott Urick (born July 15, 1977) is a lacrosse coach and former professional player.

He currently serves as Assistant Director of Athletics and Varsity Lacrosse Head Coach at Georgetown Prep. He previously served as an assistant coach for the Hoyas under his father, longtime head coach Dave Urick.

== Early life ==
Urick grew up in Geneva, New York, where his dad coached the lacrosse team at Hobart College. He moved with his family to Fairfax, Virginia, after his dad was hired at Georgetown. Urick attended Robinson High School in Fairfax, where he was an all-American and won two Virginia state championships in lacrosse. He attended Georgetown University, where he was captain of the Hoyas team in both his junior and senior years.

== MLL career ==
Urick played professionally in Major League Lacrosse (MLL) for nine seasons. Playing for the New Jersey Pride and the Chesapeake Bayhawks, he retired in 2009 as the third all-time leading goal scorer in MLL history.

== Team USA ==
Urick played for the 2006 U.S. Men's National Team in World Lacrosse Championship and lead the team in goals.

== Statistics ==
=== MLL ===
		Regular Season							Playoffs
Season	Team	GP	G	2ptG	A	Pts	LB	PIM	GP	G	2ptG	A	Pts	LB	PIM
2001	New Jersey	14	26	0	6	32	20	0.5	-	-	-	-	-	-	-
2002	New Jersey	14	24	0	5	29	51	2	1	1	0	0	1	2	0
2003	New Jersey	12	40	0	5	45	21	4	1	3	0	0	3	2	0
2004	New Jersey	11	31	0	7	38	27	0	-	-	-	-	-	-	-
2005	New Jersey	12	33	1	3	37	22	0	-	-	-	-	-	-	-
2006	New Jersey	11	35	1	8	44	23	1	-	-	-	-	-	-	-
2007	New Jersey	11	23	0	4	27	16	3	-	-	-	-	-	-	-
2008	New Jersey	11	16	0	1	17	8	0	-	-	-	-	-	-	-
2009	Washington	6	6	0	0	6	1	0	-	-	-	-	-	-	-
MLL Totals		102	234	2	39	275	189	10.5	2	4	0	0	4	4	0

== Awards ==
- Urick was the MVP of the 2002 Major League Lacrosse All-Star Game.
- Urick won the Bud Light Skills Competition Accuracy Contest Winner, 2002, and 2004.
- Urick was an All-American selection in 1999 and 2000.
- Urick was inducted into the Georgetown University Athletic Hall of Fame in 2019.
