= VHSL Group 6A North Region =

Defunct high school athletic division in Virginia, US

The Group 6A North Region was a division of the Virginia High School League (VHSL). Along with the 6A South Region, it comprised the largest high schools in Virginia. The region was formed in 2013 when the VHSL adopted a six-classification format and eliminated the previous three-classification system. It was a successor to the AAA Northern Region.

The conference system used during this period was abandoned before the 2017–18 school year. VHSL reverted to a district-based regular season format and renamed the regions. Schools formerly in the 6A North Region were redistributed into Region 6C and Region 6D.

== Districts for 2021–2022 ==
=== Region D (Northern Region) ===
==== Concorde District ====
School	Location	Mascot	Colors
Centreville High School (Virginia)	Clifton	Wildcats	Navy and Silver
Chantilly High School	Chantilly	Chargers	Purple and White
James Madison High School (Virginia)	Vienna	Warhawks	Red and Black
Oakton High School	Vienna	Cougars	Maroon and Gold
South Lakes High School	Reston	Seahawks	Navy and Teal
Westfield High School (Virginia)	Chantilly	Bulldogs	Black and Gold

==== Liberty District ====
School	Location	Mascot	Colors
George C. Marshall High School	Falls Church	Statesmen	Blue and White
Herndon High School	Herndon	Hornets	Red and Black
Langley High School (Virginia)	McLean	Saxons	Green and Gold
McLean High School	McLean	Highlanders	Red and Silver
Wakefield High School	Arlington	Warriors	Green and White
Washington-Liberty High School	Arlington	Generals	Navy and White
Yorktown High School (Virginia)	Arlington	Patriots	Navy and White

=== Region C (Occoquan Region) ===
==== Patriot District ====
School	Location	Mascot	Colors
Fairfax High School	Fairfax	Lions	Blue and Gray
Lake Braddock Secondary School	Burke	Bruins	Purple and Gold
Robinson Secondary School	Fairfax	Rams	Royal Blue and Gold
South County High School	Lorton	Stallions	Forest Green and Navy
Alexandria City High School	Alexandria	Titans	Blue and White
West Potomac High School	Alexandria	Wolverines	Royal Blue and Silver
West Springfield High School (Virginia)	Springfield	Spartans	Orange and Blue
W.T. Woodson High School	Fairfax	Cavaliers	Navy and Red

==== National District ====
School	Location	Mascot	Colors
Annandale High School	Annandale	Atoms	Red and White
Falls Church High School	Falls Church	Jaguars	Green and Gold
Hayfield Secondary School	Alexandria	Hawks	Orange and Black
Justice High School	Falls Church	Wolves	Black and Silver
Mount Vernon High School (Virginia)	Alexandria	Majors	Maroon and Gray
John R. Lewis High School	Springfield	Lancers	Navy and Gold
Thomas A. Edison High School	Alexandria	Eagles	Blue and Gold
Thomas Jefferson High School for Science and Technology	Alexandria	Colonials	Navy and Red
