= Joel Patten =

German gridiron football player (born 1958)

No. 69, 65, 78, 71
- Position: Offensive tackle

Personal information
- Born: February 7, 1958 (age 68); Augsburg, West Germany
- Listed height: 6 ft 7 in (2.01 m)
- Listed weight: 310 lb (141 kg)

Career information
- High school: Robinson (Fairfax, Virginia)
- College: Duke
- NFL draft: 1980: undrafted

Career history
- Cleveland Browns (1980–1981); Washington Federals (1983–1984); Orlando Renegades (1985); Dallas Cowboys (1986)*; Indianapolis Colts (1987–1988); San Diego Chargers (1989–1990); Los Angeles Raiders (1991)
- * Offseason or practice squad member only

Career NFL statistics
- Games played: 56
- Games started: 27
- Stats at Pro Football Reference

John Lawrence "Joel" Patten II (born February 7, 1958) is a former professional football player who played tackle for seven seasons in the National Football League (NFL) for the Cleveland Browns in 1980, Indianapolis Colts in 1987–1988, San Diego Chargers in 1989–1990, and Los Angeles Raiders in 1991–1992. He also played all 3 seasons of the United States Football League (USFL) with the Washington Federals in 1983-1984 and Orlando Renegades in 1985.

After retiring as a player, Patten remained active in professional football. He held several scouting jobs, including two stints with the Washington Redskins. He has also worked with the Houston Texans and St. Louis Rams. He worked as director of college scouting for the San Francisco 49ers and was promoted to director of player personnel on May 1, 2013.

The son of a U.S. Army officer, Patten played high school football and basketball at Robinson Secondary School in Fairfax, Virginia, where he graduated in 1976. He played his college football at Duke University in Durham, North Carolina, where he played tight end and offensive tackle, and graduated in 1980.
