= Lake Braddock Secondary School =

Location
- 9200 Burke Lake Road; Burke, Virginia 22015; 38.8026°N 77.2646°W

Information
- School type: Public, secondary school
- Founded: February 6, 1973; 53 years ago
- School district: Fairfax County Public Schools
- Principal: Lindsey Kearns
- Teaching staff: 194.39 (on an FTE basis)
- Grades: 7-12
- Enrollment: 4,397(2023–24)
- Student to teacher ratio: 22.62
- Language: English
- Campus: Suburban
- Colors: Purple and gold
- Mascot: Bruin
- Athletic conferences: Patriot District; Northern Region
- Website: https://lakebraddockss.fcps.edu/

Lake Braddock Secondary School (LBSS) in Burke, Virginia, United States, administered by Fairfax County Public Schools (FCPS), is one of three 7-12 secondary schools in Fairfax County. The other two are Hayfield SS and Robinson SS. Lake Braddock opened in 1973. Its mascot is a bruin, and the school colors are purple and gold.

== History ==
When opened in 1973, adjacent to the namesake reservoir, Lake Braddock drew its students from nearby Robinson Secondary School to the west and West Springfield High School to the south. At first, Lake Braddock was built without walls in most of its educational areas, as it was believed by the administrators of the era that students would learn better in an open environment. When school officials realized a school without walls was distracting to teenage students, temporary walls were installed around many classrooms in the late 1970s and early 1980s. This resulted in significant climate control problems throughout the building, most of which were left unfixed until the school was renovated.

Besides the "open classroom" approach, Lake Braddock, when it opened, also employed the "Forecast Five" approach, which was a "school within a school", or teams, of 150 students assigned to five teachers (math, English, science, social studies, special ed). On field trips, all 150 would go. These teams were later given names and colors.

== Academics and statistics ==
Lake Braddock Secondary School is a fully accredited secondary school based on standardized testing in Virginia. The average SAT score of a LBSS 12th grader in the 2012–2013 school year was 1674 out of 2400.

=== VDOE accreditation summary ===
The following table shows the passing rates of all Lake Braddock students in their respective years and academic subjects, as determined by the Virginia Department of Education.

Subject area	2010–11	2011–12	2012–13
English	97	97	97
History	98	95	95
Mathematics	95	94	96
Science	95	96	96

=== Demographics ===
For the 2020-2021 school year, Lake Braddock's student body was 47.42 White, 20.56% Asian, 17.89% Hispanic, 7.12% African-American, and 7.01% of other races.

== Athletics ==
=== Baseball ===
The Bruins captured their first Virginia state championship in 2012. This victory marked the culmination of a 26–3 season, the best in school history at the time. The team was ranked No. 42 in ESPN's FAB 50 national rankings, the only team from the Washington, D.C., metro area to make the list that year.

In 2019 Lake Braddock clinched its second state title, again finishing the season with a 26–3 record. The Bruins defeated Westfield High School 6–2 in the Class 6 championship game.

== Theatre ==
The Lake Braddock Theatre program is currently in its 52nd season. It has participated in the Cappie program since its inception in 1999, garnering 109 nominations and 26 awards. The theatre is represented in the International Thespian Society by troupe #4807, and contributes to the ITS festival in Lincoln, Nebraska every summer. LBT competes annually at the Virginia Theatre Association Conference.

=== Awards ===
LBT has won the Virginia High School League Patriot District/Conference One-Act Play Championship twelve times (1996, 2000, 2005, 2011, 2012, 2014–2017, 2019, 2022, and 2023). Lake Braddock Theatre has advanced to the Regional level 21 times since 1996. In 2004, 2015 and 2018, LBT advanced to the State Festival in Charlottesville, Virginia. In 2018, they won the VHSL State One-Act Play Championship for Class 6A. LBT has won 26 Cappie Awards, which include Best Play, for the 2000 and 2023 productions of Dracula. The theater was invited to perform at the Fringe Festival in Edinburgh, Scotland, in 2003. Individual students have also received awards for their performances or technical expertise throughout the years.

== Musical accomplishments ==
Several students from the Lake Braddock Music program have gone to conservatories and major schools of music, including four to the Juilliard School.

=== Orchestras ===
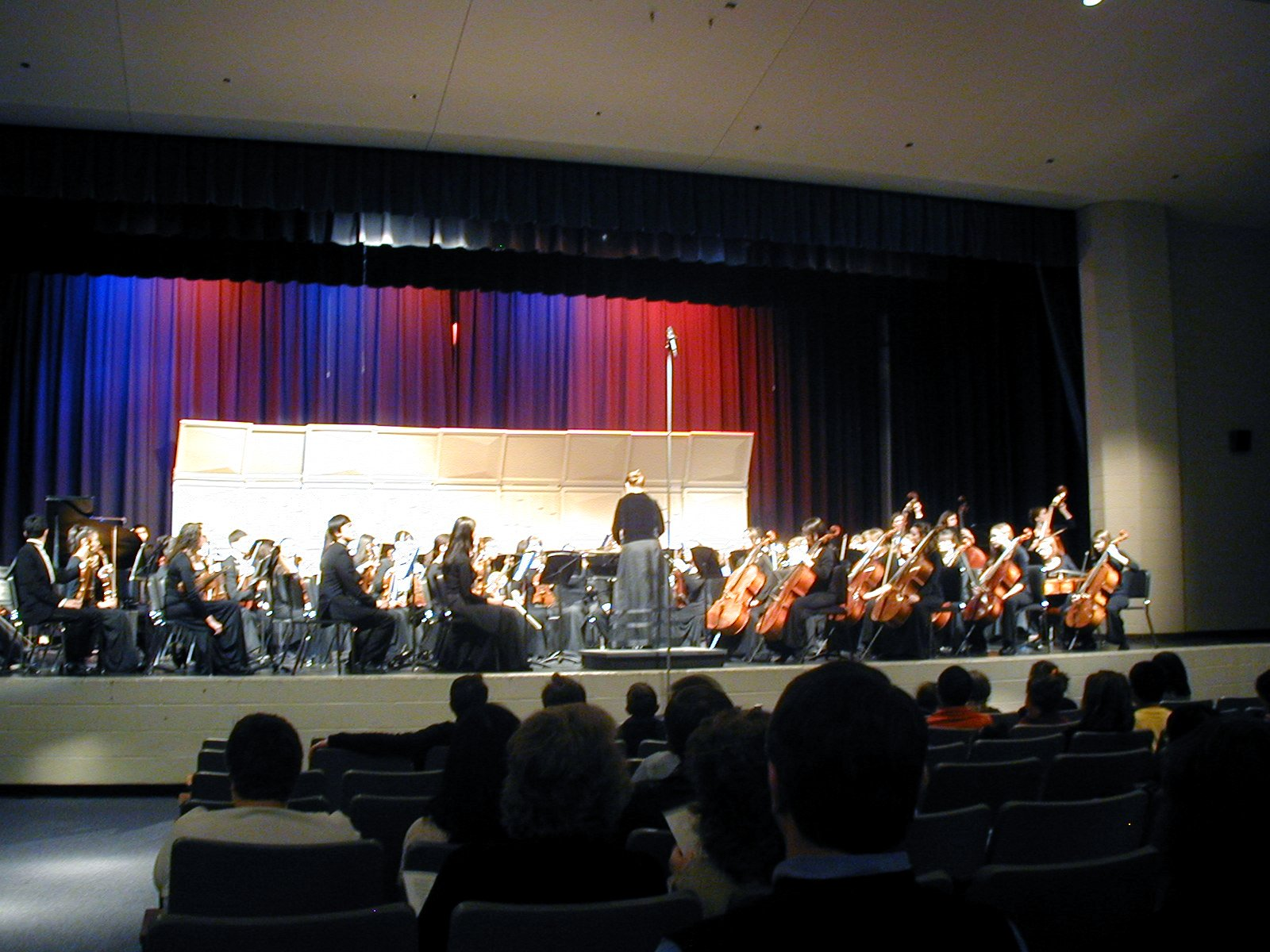
Symphony Orchestra performing at District IX Festival, on March 18, 2006 at Centreville High School

The Lake Braddock Orchestra program is made up of ten orchestras and around 400 students. The middle school ensembles are Prelude Orchestra, Crescendo Orchestra, Vivace Orchestra, Philharmonia, and Chamber Orchestra. The high school ensembles are Sinfonietta Orchestra, Concert Orchestra, Intermezzo, String Ensemble, and Symphony Orchestra. The current orchestra directors are Austin Isaac and Diana Chou. The High School Symphony Orchestra performed at the Virginia Music Education conference in 2024, and will be performing at the Midwest International Band and Orchestra Clinic in December, 2026.

== Bands ==
The Lake Braddock band program consists of five concert ensembles at the high-school level: Symphonic Band, Concert One, Concert Two, Concert Three and a specialty Jazz Band. The Symphonic Band has been awarded 38 consecutive superior ratings at the Virginia Band & Orchestra Association (VBODA) Festival since 1981, when the ratings system was first installed. The Lake Braddock Middle School bands consist of four concert ensembles; Wind Ensemble, Select Band, Cadet Band, and Bruin Band.

=== Marching band ===
The Lake Braddock Marching Band of over 230 people is a subset of Lake Braddock Bands and is combined with the Color Guard. The band has played the half-time show at Bruin football games for over 16 years. The band consistently wins awards at competitions every fall and has received a rating of Superior 41 times at the VBODA Marching Festival.

=== Color Guard ===
The Color Guard generally has about 20 members. Besides performing with the marching band in the fall, the guard performs an indoor performance in the spring, calling it "Spring Guard". In recent years, the Color Guard has been a main benefactor in the school's participation in the National Color Guard Invitational in Atlanta, Georgia.

=== Choirs ===
Combined choral groups, with the Lake Braddock Symphony Orchestra, during the Requiem concert on November 15, 2005 at Immanuel Bible Church

The Lake Braddock Chorus consisted of five different choirs until the 2017–2018 school year. The Men's Choir, Women's Vocal Ensemble and the female Freshmen in Bel Canto madeup the non-auditioned choirs, and Select Women and Lake Braddock Singers made up the auditioned choirs. In 2017, Bel Canto and Women's Vocal Ensemble were combined. The Lake Braddock Singers (formally known as Symphonic Chorale) is composed of sopranos, altos, tenors, and basses.

The chorus performed in the Macy’s Thanksgiving Parade in 2002. An a cappella group formed in 2008, inspired by the pop a cappella groups of major colleges, including JMU Madison Project and Blues Tones organizations that perform yearly for the choir program at Lake Braddock. The group was founded by students and is managed by students as well.

The choirs have won many awards, including winning several in Nashville in 2006. In 2007, the choir performed in New York City near the site of the former World Trade Center buildings. The choirs also have turned out several highly successful singers, including a quarter-finalist for American Idol, and several performers in musical theater. Every year the Lake Braddock Chorus and the Lake Braddock Theatre programs come together and produce a musical. The musical theatre has been around since 1975 and has produced shows such as Guys and Dolls; Thoroughly Modern Millie; Annie; Les Misérables; Cinderella; Annie, Get Your Gun; Hairspray; Beauty and the Beast. Rehearsals occur in the spring when the show airs to the public.

== Clubs ==
Lake Braddock is home to over 70 clubs. The DECA Club has sent students to national level competitions. In September 2006, Lake Braddock started a boys' volleyball team. The Lake Braddock Speech Team was reorganized in 2006 and began to compete in the VHSL. The Lake Braddock Key Club is one of the school's biggest and most prosperous clubs; having over 400 members, they raised $5,300 for UNICEF in October 2012. The Lake Braddock Model United Nations Club is an active participant in local and national conferences. LBSS has one of the few active high school chapters of Students for a Democratic Society. The It's Academic team has been featured on WRC-TV multiple times. Lake Braddock provides crew (rowing) as a club sport. Lake Braddock Crew has medaled in many regattas, including state competitions. Lake Braddock also features an Army JROTC program, started in 2010, which currently has over 150 cadets.

== Honor societies ==
Lake Braddock houses many honor societies including the Lake Braddock chapter of the National Honor Society, National Social Studies Honor Society, Spanish National Honor Society, French Honor Society, German Honor Society, National Art Honor Society, and many more. These actively work to improve the Lake Braddock community.

== Student media ==
=== The Bear Facts ===
The Bear Facts is Lake Braddock's student news periodical with a circulation of about 3000 students and community members. It is student-run under the guidance of an adviser. Content decisions are governed by staff writers, editors, and any other students involved. Printed as a newspaper since its founding in 1973, it changed to a black and white/color news magazine format in 2013. The Bear Facts is a member of the Virginia High School League, the National Scholastic Press Association, and the Columbia Scholastic Press Association.

==== Controversy ====
In 2007, The Bear Facts had an advisory change over issues published in March 2007. Controversy arose on articles published on "homosexuality, trans sexuality and review of a documentary about bestiality," as well as its March 30 issue, which had carried a story on Post Secret, a website that posts anonymous contributors' secrets displayed on homemade postcards. The school released a statement that the dismissal was for "basic journalism" errors.

== Incidents ==
On February 19, 1975, a bomber exploded a tear gas canister in a stairwell, sending 65 students to the school clinic and one student to the hospital for eye irritation.

On May 28, 1979, an electrical panel fire forced the school to be closed for the remainder of the school year.

On November 11, 1982, a dropout looking for his girlfriend held a group of ten employees, including the principal, hostage with a rifle for 21 hours.

In 1990, a man set fire to Lake Braddock Secondary School and two other schools. The total damage among all the schools was $200,000.

In April and May 1994, there were two incidents of 13-year-olds bringing guns to school.

On September 23, 1994, two teenagers were shot by a gang member after a Lake Braddock football game.

On March 23, 2015, a bomb threat was sent to several teachers early in the morning, resulting in the closure of the school. The threat was determined to be a hoax after police swept the building and found nothing.

On April 20, 2016, a 16-year-old student was found unresponsive in a bathroom at around 6:00 p.m. The student was then taken to Inova Fairfax Hospital, where she was pronounced dead.

In 2018 the principal, Dave Thomas, retired after a report of his handling of a sexual harassment scandal at the school by the Washington Post and later WUSA9.

== Renovations ==
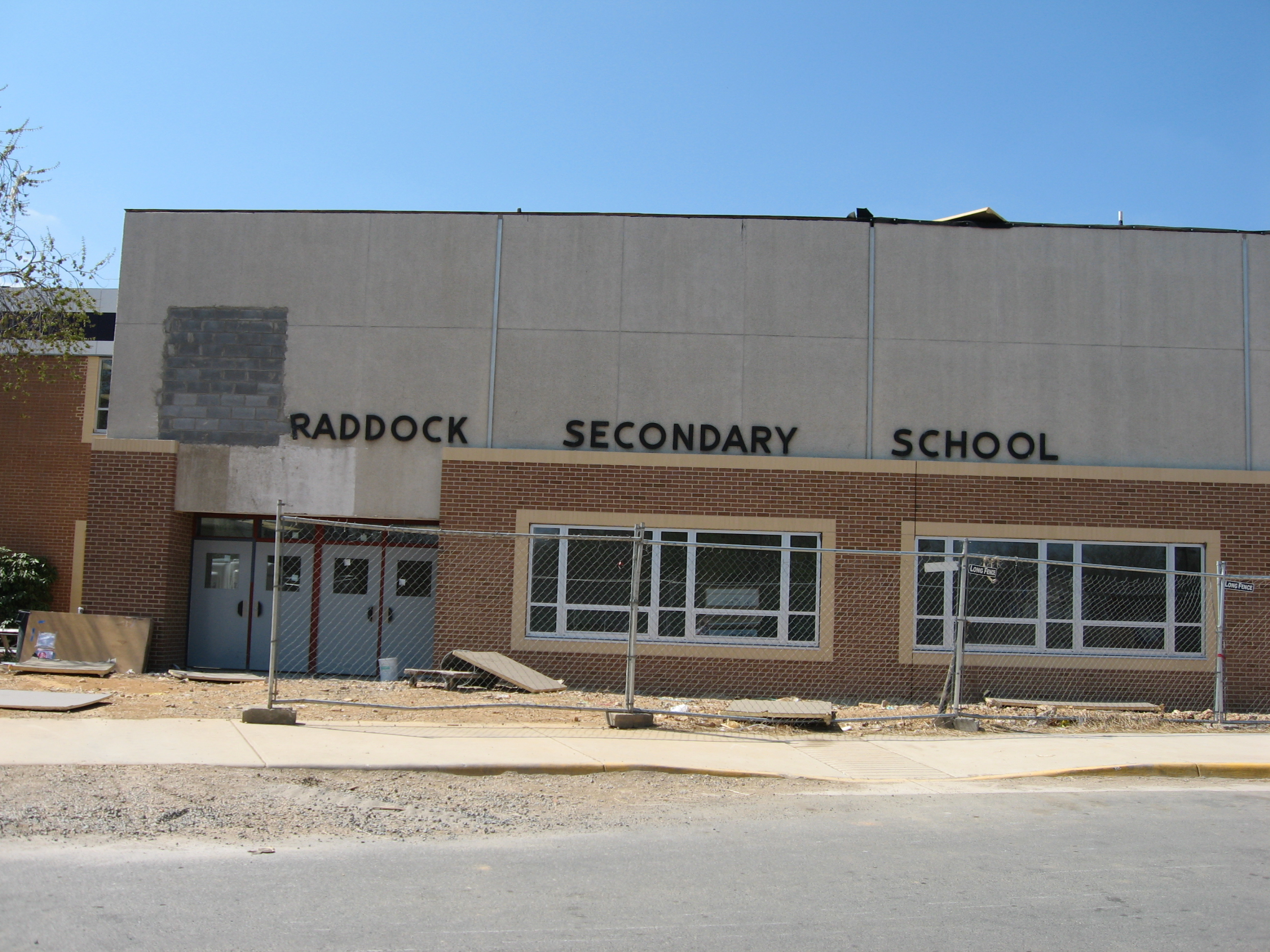
A picture of Lake Braddock, during the height of renovation (April 2006)

The school finished a three-year renovation in the summer of 2007, beginning right after school ended in June 2004. The renovations cost taxpayers around $72 million - a record for Fairfax County Public Schools. Fifty-two classroom trailers were installed on campus to accommodate the construction. Other than expanding the school and refurbishing the building, two main goals of the project were to repair an overhaul of the ventilation system and enclose classrooms with permanent walls. Samaha Associates, P.C. were the architects for Lake Braddock's renovation, which is now seen as a model for other renovation projects in Fairfax County, such as the renovation of nearby W.T. Woodson High School.

== Notable alumni ==
- Yousef Abu-Taleb (class of 1998), actor
- Sanju Bansal, founding partner of MicroStrategy
- Tal Bayer (class of 1988), founding member of the Pietasters
- Adam Butler, former MLB player (Atlanta Braves)
- Ann Marie Calhoun (class of 1997), violinist
- Julia Campbell (class of 1979), actress; has appeared on television shows such as Friends and Seinfeld
- Matthew Continetti (class of 1999), author; journalist; frequent contributor on the MSNBC television show Hardball with Chris Matthews
- Colette Cunningham (class of 1989), former soccer player, making two appearances for the United States women's national team.
- Hubert Davis (class of 1988), played 12 seasons in the NBA; Head coach for the UNC men's basketball team
- Chad Dukes (class of 1997), co-host of sports radio show Chad Dukes vs. The World on WJFK 106.7FM in Washington, D.C.; born Chad Sisson
- Tiffany Dupont (class of 1999), actress; appeared in "The Bedford Diaries" on The CW, Grounded For Life, Yes, Dear, Joan of Arcadia, and Greek
- Sonjay Dutt (class of 2000), professional wrestler; born Retesh Bhalla
- Billy Edwards Jr. (class of 2021), American college football quarterback for the Wake Forest Demon Deacons, Maryland Terrapins, Wisconsin Badgers and the North Carolina Tar Heels.
- Greg Eklund (class of 1988), drummer and guitarist; member of the alternative rock band Everclear, 1994–2003; member of the rock band The Oohlas, 2004–present; brother of Mark Eklund
- Tom Goodin (class of 1988), founding member of the Pietasters
- Thomas "Tag" Greason, Republican politician, former member of the Virginia House of Delegates
- Mia Hamm (class of 1989), professional women's soccer player, World Cup winner, and Olympic gold medalist
- Matthew Hibner (class of 2020), college football tight end for the Michigan Wolverines and the SMU Mustangs
- Allen Johnson (class of 1989), track and field star; Olympic gold medalist; namesake of the school's track and annual outdoor track and field invitational
- Dan Leal, (class of 1987), American pornographic director and actor, also known in the industry as Porno Dan
- Glennon Doyle Melton (class of 1994) author of Carry On, Warrior and Love Warrior
- Travis Morrison (class of 1990), founding member and vocalist/guitarist for The Dismemberment Plan; member of Travis Morrison Hellfighters
- Ed Moses (class of 1998), swimmer and Olympic gold medalist
- Ryan Newell (class of 1990), lead guitarist for rock band Sister Hazel
- Michael Powell (class of 1981), lobbyist, 24th chair of the Federal Communications Commission, president of the National Cable & Telecommunications Association
- RaMell Ross (class of 2000), American filmmaker, photographer, academic, and writer best known for his 2024 film adaptation of the novel The Nickel Boys (2019)
- Chris Segal, Major League Baseball umpire
- Mary Simpson, professional violinist with Yanni
- Justin Spring (class of 2002), gymnast; member of United States 2008 Olympic gymnastics team
- Madeline Swegle (class of 2013), United States Naval Aviator, first black female tactical jet pilot in the U.S. Navy
- Susan Williams (class of 1987), Olympic bronze medalist in the triathlon, 2004
