= Southwestern Youth Association =

- Nickname: SYA
- Founded: 1973
- Type: 501(c)(3)
- Headquarters: Centreville, Virginia
- Region served: Southwestern Fairfax County, Virginia
- Website: syasports.org

Southwestern Youth Association (SYA) is a 501(c) 3 nonprofit sports league for youth ages 5-18. Housing hundreds of house/recreational level teams and dozens of travel teams (basketball, baseball, competition cheer, softball and volleyball), SYA was founded in 1973 with 350 participants. It purpose was to be a place to play and a community cornerstone built on recreational, competitive sports for the youth of Southwestern Fairfax County (primarily Centreville and Clifton, Virginia) and open to all children regardless of their financial status or athletic ability.
