= AAA Northern Region =

High school athletic division in Virginia, US

The AAA Northern Region was one of the four AAA regions in the Virginia High School League in Virginia, United States. It was made up of four districts: the AAA Concorde District, the AAA Liberty District, the AAA National District, and the AAA Patriot District. Group AAA is the largest enrollment class for VHSL schools, and typically AAA is the most competitive level. In 2013, the three classification format was eliminated in favor of a six classification system. Accordingly, the Northern Region was eliminated, while the districts were retained for regular season competition.

The Northern Region comprises most of the public schools in Northern Virginia, including all the public high schools in Fairfax County, Arlington County, Alexandria City, and one high school in Loudoun County. The region is also the smallest geographically of all the A, AA, and AAA VHSL regions, where boundaries have remained within the outer limits of Fairfax County for most of its history.

== History of the Northern Region ==
=== Past Northern Region districts ===
In 1965, the then nineteen schools in the Northern Region which competed at the AAA varsity level were first organized into three districts based primarily on geographic location. The Northern Region was originally made up of three districts. They were the AAA Northern District, the AAA Alexandria District, and the AAA Potomac District. The Alexandria District had its name changed to the Gunston District within a few years. The Northern Region had these districts until 1976, when a fourth district, the Great Falls, was added. These districts served the region until the 1993–1994 school year.

There are currently 17 teams playing in the Northern Region (6D) as of the 2018–2019 school year. The Concorde District includes Centreville, Chantilly, Madison, Oakton, Westfield. The Cedar Run District includes Battlefield, Osbourn, Osbourn Park, Patriot, Stonewall Jackson. The Liberty District includes Herndon, Langley, McLean, South Lakes, Washington-Liberty, Yorktown. Marshall is in the National District but the other members of that district play in region 6C.

=== Major changes in the Northern Region ===
==== Current district names ====
The four current district names (Concorde, Cedar Run, Liberty, National) were adopted in the 1993-1994 school based on which division (5 or 6) of football they played in. The Concorde and Patriot Districts held Division 6 schools which are larger AAA schools; the Liberty and National Districts held only Division 5 schools which are smaller AAA schools.

===== 2005 =====
In 2003, Loudoun Valley and Stone Bridge, members of the AA Dulles District, were moved to the AAA Northern Region for the 2005-2007 playing cycle due to enrollment increases in the schools. The Northern Region originally tried to keep both schools away from the region, but the VHSL forced them to accept the two Loudoun County schools anyway. Loudoun schools Broad Run, Park View, and Potomac Falls were Northern Region members before, but they joined before a 2001 VHSL provision was passed which would allow schools to play down a class due to transportation hardships, which both the Loudoun schools and the Northern Region used as a reason to keep its geography within Fairfax County, but this plan failed because the VHSL did not believe either school's location warranted such a request. Thus, Loudoun Valley and Stone Bridge were forced to join the Northern Region, with Valley receiving an exemption to become a playoff only member of the National District and Stone Bridge joining the Liberty in all sports. However, Loudoun Valley's time in the region was short lived, as they were moved to the AAA Cedar Run District of the AAA Northwest Region for the 2007-2009 cycle.

===== 2009 =====
In 2007, Stone Bridge was provisionally placed to move to the Cedar Run District for the 2009-2011 cycle with Loudoun Valley along with Heritage of Leesburg, because the district would lose three members due to a decline in enrollment, as well as to keep the balance of regions as equal as possible. However, all three Loudoun schools appealed the redistricting, with Loudoun Valley and Heritage requesting to move into the Northern Region, and Stone Bridge requesting to remain in it. The VHSL decided to reject Loudoun Valley's and Heritage's appeals, but allowed Stone Bridge to remain in the Northern Region.

=== Former members of the Northern Region ===
==== Alexandria City schools ====
Francis C. Hammond High School and George Washington High School were members of the Northern Region until 1971, when they consolidated into the newer T. C. Williams High School, as was portrayed in the 2000 movie Remember the Titans. The city of Alexandria has had just one senior high school for its students ever since. After the consolidation, Hammond and GW were reconfigured to hold the city's 9th and 10th graders, with the 11th and 12th graders attending T.C. In the 1980s Hammond and GW were reassigned as middle schools.

==== Fairfax County schools ====
Fort Hunt High School and Groveton High School were both members of the Northern Region in the 1970s and the 1980s until they consolidated to form West Potomac High School in 1985. West Potomac uses the former Groveton High's facilities. Fort Hunt High School's facilities are now being used as the site of Carl Sandburg Middle School.

Thomas Jefferson High School of Alexandria was also a longtime member of the Northern Region until 1985 when it phased in the Thomas Jefferson High School for Science and Technology program. Though TJHSST and TJHS used the same building and had the same mascot (Colonials), they were still considered to be separate schools. Students at Thomas Jefferson High School were also eventually moved to nearby Annandale High School in 1987.

==== Loudoun County schools ====
From 1996 to 1999, Broad Run High School of Ashburn and Park View High School of Sterling were admitted to the Northern Region in the Liberty District. Potomac Falls High School of Sterling opened in 1997 and was also a member of the Northern Region as a member of the Concorde District from 1997 until 1999. In 1999, all three schools dropped back to Group AA and returned to the Northwestern District because their enrollment numbers dropped significantly due to Potomac Falls' opening.

From 2005 to 2007, Loudoun Valley High School of Purcellville, entered the Northern Region as a full member for football and as a playoff only member for other sports in the National District. The school's distance caused travel concerns among Loudoun Valley and other district members. Loudoun Valley moved to the AAA Cedar Run District of the Northwest Region after its two-year stint.

== Region champions ==
Fall '21 Sports Champions

- Cheerleading: Chantilly
- Boys Cross Country:
- Girls Cross County:
- Field Hockey: Madison
- Football (Division 6): Madison
- Golf:
- Volleyball: Langley

Winter '20-21 Sports Champions

- Boys Basketball: Centreville
- Girls Basketball: Madison
- Girls Gymnastics: Washington-Liberty
- Boys Swimming:
- Girls Swimming:
- Boys Indoor Track:
- Girls Indoor Track:
- Wrestling:

Spring '21 Sports Champions

- Baseball: Madison
- Boys Lacrosse: Yorktown
- Girls Lacrosse: Langley
- Boys Soccer: Yorktown
- Girls Soccer: McLean
- Softball: Washington-Liberty
- Boys Tennis: Oakton
- Girls Tennis: Oakton
- Boys Track:
- Girls Track:

== AAA championships won by Northern Region schools in 2008-2021 ==
- Boys Basketball: T.C. Williams
- Cheerleading: Stone Bridge
- Cheerleading: Fairfax
- Boys Cross Country: Oakton
- Boys Swim and Dive: Robinson
- Girls Swim and Dive: Robinson
- Girls Swim and Dive: Fairfax
- Softball: McLean
- Girls Soccer: McLean
- Girls Swim and Dive: Oakton
- Girls Lacrosse: Oakton/Madison
- Boys Lacrosse: Langley
- Baseball: Lake Braddock
- Boys Cross Country: Chantilly
- Girls Cross Country: Lake Braddock
- Football: Centreville (2013)
- Football: Westfield (2015, 2016, 2017)
- Boys Basketball: Centreville (2020, 2021)
- Girls Basketball: Madison (2020, 2021)

== Wachovia Cup ==
The Wachovia Cup is given to the top school in AAA (as well as AA and A) to schools who consistently win championships in a wide variety of activities. Points are awarded to schools who win state championships, runners-up, etc., and are tallied up at the end of the year.

=== Athletics ===
Frank W. Cox High School of Virginia Beach and the AAA Eastern Region won the Wachovia Cup for athletics for Group AAA in the 2006–2007 school year.

Here are the Northern Region members that finished in the top 10 in the 2006–2007 school year for athletics:

- 2nd Place: Robinson
- 4th Place: Oakton
- 7th Place: Westfield
- 8th Place: Lake Braddock
- 9th Place (tie): Chantilly
- 9th Place: Jefferson
- 9th Place: Woodson

=== Academics ===
The Wachovia Cup for Academics is given based on the same criteria as the Athletics Cup, except that points are based on academic activities sponsored by the VHSL. In the 2006–2007, Westfield won the AAA Academic Cup. The Northern Region dominated the Academic Cup standings, with two of the top five schools being Northern Region members, six of the top 10 finishers being members, and fourteen of the top 25 being Northern Region members.

Here are the Northern Region members that finished in the top 10 in the 2006–2007 school year for academic activities:

- AAA Champion: Westfield
- 3rd Place: Chantilly
- 7th Place: West Springfield
- 8th Place: Hayfield
- 9th Place: Yorktown
- 10 Place: Annandale
