= Liberty District =

High school athletic conference in Virginia

High School Athletic Conference
- Founded: 1993
- Affiliation: Virginia High School League
- Region: Region 6D (Class 6)
- Teams: 7

The Liberty District is an American high school athletic district in Northern Virginia under the Virginia High School League (VHSL). Founded in 1993 during a Northern Region realignment, it includes public high schools in Fairfax and Arlington Counties.

== History ==
The district's charter members in 1993 included Fairfax, Falls Church High School, George C. Marshall High School, James Madison, Langley, McLean High School, and Robert E. Lee High School.

Notable shifts include:

- 1996: Falls Church High School moved to the National District; Broad Run High School and Park View joined.
- 1999: Broad Run and Park View dropped to AA; W.T. Woodson High School joined.
- 2003: South Lakes High School joined.
- 2005: Thomas Jefferson High School for Science and Technology and Stone Bridge High School joined; Fairfax and Lee moved out.
- 2009: Fairfax returned; Woodson moved to the Patriot District.
- 2015: Washington-Liberty High School and Yorktown High School joined; Marshall and Jefferson left.
- 2017: Herndon High School replaced Madison.
- 2021: South Lakes left.

== Member schools ==
As of 2024–25, the Liberty District comprises:

School	Location	Mascot	Colors
George C. Marshall High School	Falls Church	Statesmen	Blue and White
Herndon High School	Herndon	Hornets	Red and Black
Langley High School	McLean	Saxons	Green and Gold
McLean High School	McLean	Highlanders	Red and Silver
Wakefield High School	Arlington	Warriors	Green and White
Washington-Liberty High School	Arlington	Generals	Navy and White
Yorktown High School	Arlington	Patriots	Navy and White

== Championships and legacy ==
Liberty District schools have earned numerous VHSL titles:

School	Sport	Title	Year	Ref
W.T. Woodson High School	Boys Basketball	VHSL Class 6 Champions	2017	
Lake Braddock Secondary School	Gymnastics	Class 6 State Champions	2022–2025	
McLean High School	Baseball, Swimming	Multiple regional titles; produced MLB pitcher Josh Sborz	Various	
Washington-Liberty High School	Football, Wrestling, Cheer	Various state titles; Super Bowl MVP Jake Scott alum	1970s–2010s	
Herndon High School	Soccer	VHSL Class 6 State Champions	1989, 2025	

== Notable alumni ==
- Josh Sborz (McLean HS) – MLB World Series champion.
- Jake Scott (Washington-Liberty HS) – Miami Dolphins safety, Super Bowl VII MVP.
- Eric Dorsey (McLean HS) – Two-time Super Bowl champion with the New York Giants.
- Keith Lyle, Nick Sorensen, Michael McCrary (Marshall HS) – NFL players.

== Governance ==
Liberty District championships are awarded based on regular season records or district tournaments. Top finishers advance to VHSL Region 6D competition. For cross country and similar sports, the top four teams and top 15 individuals advance from district to regionals.

== See also ==
- Virginia High School League
- VHSL Class 6
- VHSL Region 6D
- Concorde District
- National District (VHSL)
- Patriot District
