= Dana Coons =

American long distance runner

Personal information
- Born: September 27, 1978 (age 47) Fairfax, Virginia, U.S.

Sport
- Sport: Track, Long-distance running
- Event(s): 5000 meters, 10,000 meters, Marathon
- College team: UVA

Achievements and titles
- Personal best(s): 1500 meters: 4:25.10; 5000 meters: 16:17.54; 10,000 meters: 33:07.58; Marathon: 2:38:18

Dana Turner Coons Thiele (born September 27, 1978) is an American long distance runner. She is a two-time qualifier for the US Olympic Trials (10,000m in 2004, marathon in 2008), and in 2007, she was ranked 16th in the country for the marathon with a time of 2:38:18. In the 2008 Olympic Marathon trials in Boston, Coons finished 30th in a time of 2:41:31. Her twin brother, Jason Turner Coons, played club lacrosse at James Madison University.

== Running career ==
=== High school ===
Coons was born in Fairfax, Virginia, and attended James Madison High School in Vienna, Virginia, where she graduated in 1997. While running during high school she was a two-time district champion in the 1,600 meters as a sophomore and as a junior and a district champion in cross country and on the track in the 3,200 meters as a junior.

=== Collegiate ===
Coons went to college at the University of Virginia, where she was a fine arts major. During her fourth and final year, she won the ACC title at 10,000m, and was an NCAA qualifier at that distance. Upon graduating from UVA, Coons spent two years in Charlottesville, Virginia as an assistant coach at UVA, and during that time she lowered her 10,000m personal best to 33:07 (Cardinal Invitational, 2003).

=== Post-collegiate ===
In September 2003, Coons moved to Minneapolis, Minnesota to train with Team USA Minnesota, where she trained under coach Dennis Barker with Carrie Tollefson, Katie McGregor, and other elite athletes. It was during this time that she moved up to the marathon - she debuted in the Twin Cities Marathon, running 2:46:54 in October, 2005. After spending two years with Team USA Minnesota, she then moved back to Charlottesville. One year later, she lowered her personal best to 2:38:18, at the 2006 Chicago Marathon. She helped found, and coaches for Ragged Mountain Racing, a post-collegiate training team based in Charlottesville, Virginia and modeled after Team USA Minnesota.
