= Robert DeProspero =

US Secret Service agent (1938–2019)

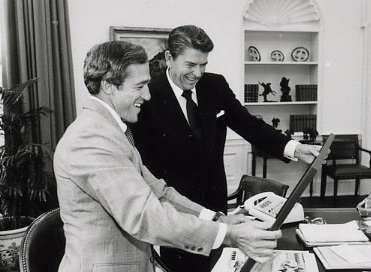
DeProspero looks at a print with President Reagan

Robert Lee DeProspero (December 31, 1938 – March 4, 2019) was a United States Secret Service special agent who served from 1965 to 1986.

== Life ==
DeProspero attended West Virginia University, where he earned a bachelor's degree in physical education in 1959 and a master's degree in education in 1960. After serving in the United States Air Force from 1960 to 1963, he was employed by James Madison High School in Vienna, Virginia, where he taught biological sciences and coached football and wrestling. In 1965, DeProspero joined the Secret Service, where he moved up the ranks and held many positions. In 1981 after the attempted assassination of Ronald Reagan, he took charge of Reagan's security detail. The following year, DeProspero was appointed to head the Presidential Protective Division.

DeProspero devised several very important and innovative security measures during his time in the Secret Service that are used today — the "hospital agent" (stationing an agent at the nearest primary trauma hospital on a presidential movement), as well as the creation of metal detector checkpoints to screen every individual who could get a view of the president. DeProspero was born in Morgantown, West Virginia. He died on March 4, 2019, at the age of 80 in Scottsdale, Arizona.
