= Jay Franklin (baseball) =

American baseball player (born 1953)

- Pitcher
- Born: March 16, 1953 (age 73); Arlington, Virginia, U.S.
- Batted: Right Threw: Right

MLB debut
- September 4, 1971, for the San Diego Padres

Last MLB appearance
- September 21, 1971, for the San Diego Padres

MLB statistics
- Win–loss record: 0–1
- Earned Run Average: 6.35
- Strikeouts: 4
- Stats at Baseball Reference

Teams
- San Diego Padres (1971)

John William "Jay" Franklin (born March 16, 1953) is an American former Major League Baseball pitcher. Taken second in the MLB draft in 1971 by the San Diego Padres at just 18 years old, Franklin pitched in three games before an injury caused him to sit out the 1972 season. He was relegated to the minors in 1973 and was released by the Padres organization in 1977.

== High school career ==
Franklin attended James Madison High School in Vienna, Virginia, graduating in 1971.

== Professional career ==
Franklin was selected second overall by the San Diego Padres in baseball’s amateur draft in 1971, earning a $65,000 bonus. He remains Major League Baseball's highest high school draft pick from the Washington / Baltimore area.

After being drafted by the Padres, Franklin was assigned to the Tri-City Padres of the Northwest League in Kennewick, Washington, where he compiled an 8–1 record with 134 strikeouts in 104 innings. The Padres called him up to the majors in September 1971, making him the youngest player in the National League in 1971. He made his major league debut September 4 against the Atlanta Braves, pitching two innings of shutout ball in relief and striking out two. He pitched out of the bullpen again on September 8 against the Cincinnati Reds, giving up one unearned run in 1 1/3 innings of relief. On September 21, manager Preston Gomez gave the starting nod to Jay Franklin in another game against the Atlanta Braves. After getting Felix Millan to pop out and Ralph Garr to ground out, Hank Aaron stepped up to the plate and hit his 638th career home run off Franklin. Franklin would pitch two more innings giving up home runs to both Darrell Evans and Garr before being pulled in the third inning.

After reporting to spring training in 1972, Franklin injured his elbow and was out for the entire season. He was injured again in 1973. Franklin spent two more seasons in Louisiana, then one each with AA Amarillo, and AAA Hawaii before the Padres released him at the end of the 1977 season.
