= Ogunnaike =

- Language: Yoruba

Origin
- Region of origin: West Africa

Ogunnaike is Yoruba surname. Notable people with the surname include:

- Babatunde Ogunnaike, American chemical engineer of Nigerian descent
- Lola Ogunnaike, American entertainment journalist
