= National District (VHSL) =

The National District is a high school conference in the state of Virginia that includes schools from eastern Fairfax County.

The National District was founded in 1993 as part of an attempted realignment of the Northern Region. The charter members of the district were Edison, Mount Vernon, Justice, Wakefield, Washington-Liberty, West Potomac, and Yorktown High Schools.

Currently all eight of the member high schools compete at the 6A level in VHSL. However, in the past five of the eight high schools were classified as 5A high schools. With the 2013 post-season conference realignment, the 5A schools are a part of the post-season conference 13 and the 6A schools reside in conference 6, with Liberty District high schools. This process has been deemed very confusing due to the inter-twinning of regular season districts and post-season conferences. Generally speaking, the regular season conferences have been kept together for local purposes while the post-season conferences were put together for school population matters.

== Membership changes ==
Most of the National District schools have stayed intact since its founding. In 1996, West Potomac moved from the National to the Patriot and Falls Church was added from the Liberty District. From 2003 to 2005, Jefferson moved from the Concorde to the National only for football, where the Colonials clinched a Division 5 playoff berth in 2004.

Loudoun Valley of Purcellville was added in 2005 as a full member for football, but as a part-time member in other sports by participating only in post season district tournaments, because it was located about 50 miles or more west of the National District schools. In sports other than football, Valley played an independent schedule, usually against schools in the AA Dulles District. In 2007, Loudoun Valley was moved to the Northwest Region which was regarded as a welcomed move to the National District's members.

Hayfield joined the National in 2009, as its population was cut nearly in half by the opening of South County in 2005 making it a struggle for the Hawks to compete with schools in the Patriot District whose student bodies were nearly double.

Starting with the 2015–16 school year, the National District will have the same membership as Capitol Conference 13.(2) The number of schools in the National District will reduce from eight to seven. Mt. Vernon, which has been reclassified as a 6A size school starting with the 2015–16 season, and Hayfield, already a 6A, moves to the Patriot District/Conference 7. Arlington County high schools Washington-Liberty and Yorktown, who were already 6A in size since the 2013–14 school year, will shift from the National to the Liberty District/Conference 6 to join those 6A size schools. Moving from the Liberty to the National will be George C. Marshall and Thomas Jefferson. John R. Lewis comes to the National/Capitol from the Patriot. All those schools are 5A in size. The new district changes means all the schools in the former Northern Region under the three classification setup will now have all 6A and 5A schools grouped in the same districts as their conference assignments with the new six classification arrangement.

As of July 1, 2021, the National District would consolidate with the remaining Gunston District members, and continue to bear the National District name moving forward, thus ending the 2nd incarnation of the Gunston District.

== Current members ==
School	Location	Mascot	Colors
Annandale High School	Annandale	Atoms	Red and White
Edison High School (Fairfax County, Virginia)	Alexandria	Eagles	Blue and Red
Falls Church High School	Falls Church	Jaguars	Green and Gold
Hayfield Secondary School	Alexandria	Hawks	Orange and Black
Justice High School	Falls Church	Wolves	Black and Silver
John R. Lewis High School	Springfield	Lancers	Navy and Gold
Mount Vernon High School	Alexandria	Majors	Maroon and Gray
Thomas Jefferson High School for Science and Technology	Alexandria	Colonials	Navy and Red

== Former members ==
School	Location	Mascot	Colors	Years active
George C. Marshall High School	Falls Church	Statesmen	Blue and White	2015–2021
Loudoun Valley High School	Purcellville	Vikings	Green and Gold	2005–2007
Wakefield High School	Arlington	Warriors	Green and White	1994–2021
Washington-Liberty High School	Arlington	Generals	Navy and White	1994–2015
West Potomac High School	Alexandria	Wolverines	Royal Blue and Silver	1994–1996
Yorktown High School	Arlington	Patriots	Navy and White	1994–2015

== 2021-2022 district champions ==
Fall Sports District Champions

- Cheerleading: Justice
- Boys Cross Country: Thomas Jefferson
- Girls Cross Country: Hayfield
- Field Hockey: Justice
- Golf: Edison
- Football: Hayfield
- Volleyball: Justice

Winter Sports District Champions

- Boys Basketball: Hayfield
- Girls Basketball: Edison
- Girls Gymnastics:
- Boys Swimming:
- Girls Swimming:
- Boys Indoor Track: Edison
- Girls Indoor Track: Hayfield
- Wrestling: Edison

Spring Sports District Champions

- Baseball:
- Boys Lacrosse:
- Girls Lacrosse:
- Boys Soccer: Justice
- Girls Soccer:
- Softball: Edison
- Boys Tennis:
- Girls Tennis:
- Boys Track:
- Girls Track:

== State champions since 2004 ==
Virginia State Championships
Year	Sport/Competition	School
2004	AAA Forensics	Edison
2005	AAA Debate	Edison
2006	AAA Debate	Yorktown
2006	AAA Girls Swimming and Diving	Yorktown
2007	AAA Girls Swimming and Diving	Yorktown
2007	AAA Debate	Yorktown
2008	AAA Debate	Yorktown
2009	AAA Forensics	West Springfield
2009	AAA Debate	West Springfield
2010	AAA Forensics	Yorktown
2013	AAA Swim & Dive	Falls Church

== See also ==
- Virginia High School League
- Patriot District
- Liberty District
- Concorde District
- Dulles District
- Northwestern District
- List of high schools in Virginia
- Category:High school sports in Virginia
