= Eastland Gardens =

Coordinates: 38.9055°N 76.9434°W

- Neighborhood of Washington, D.C.
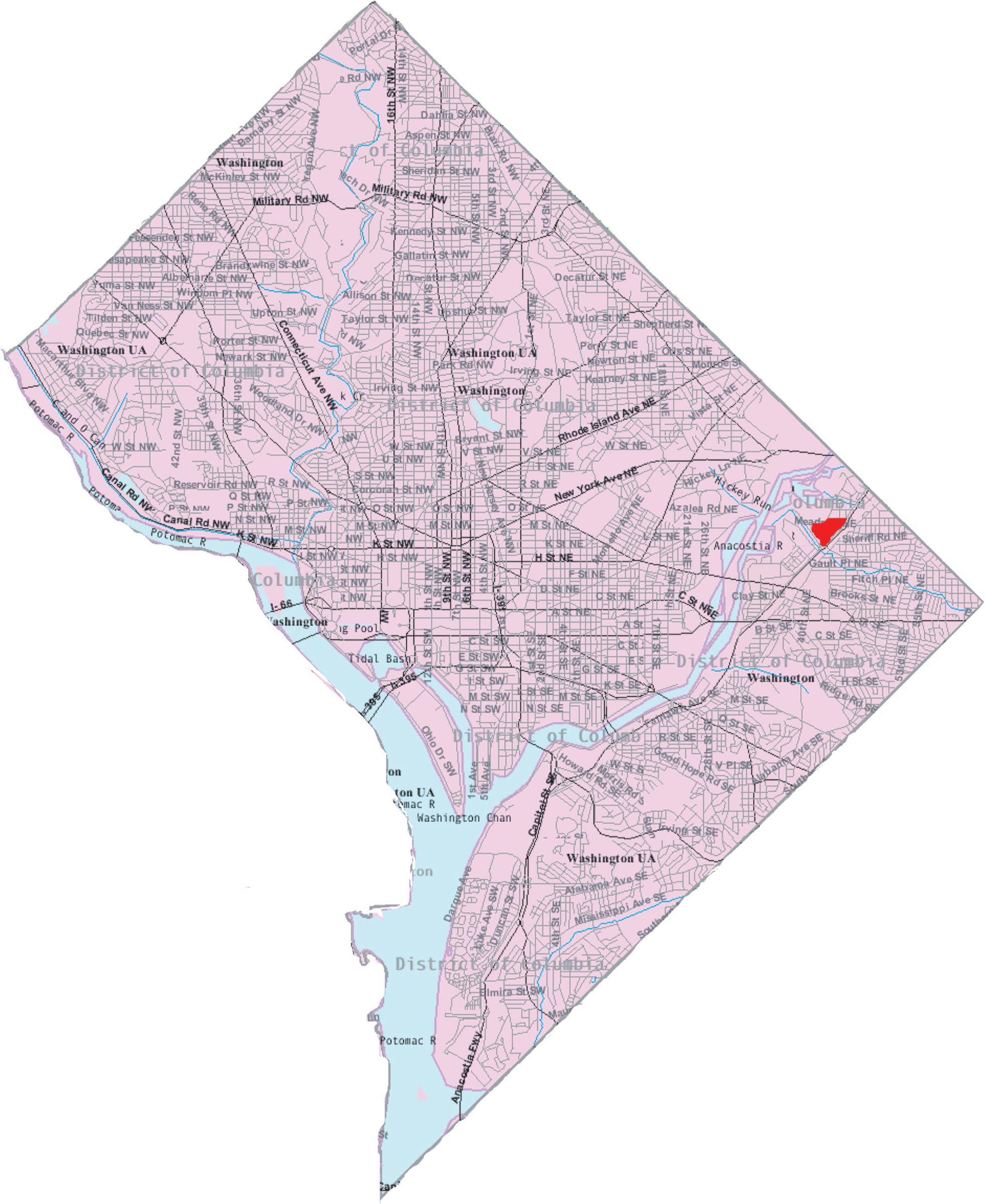
- Eastland Gardens within the District of Columbia
- Country: United States
- District: Washington, D.C.
- Ward: Ward 7

Government
  - Councilmember: Wendell Felder

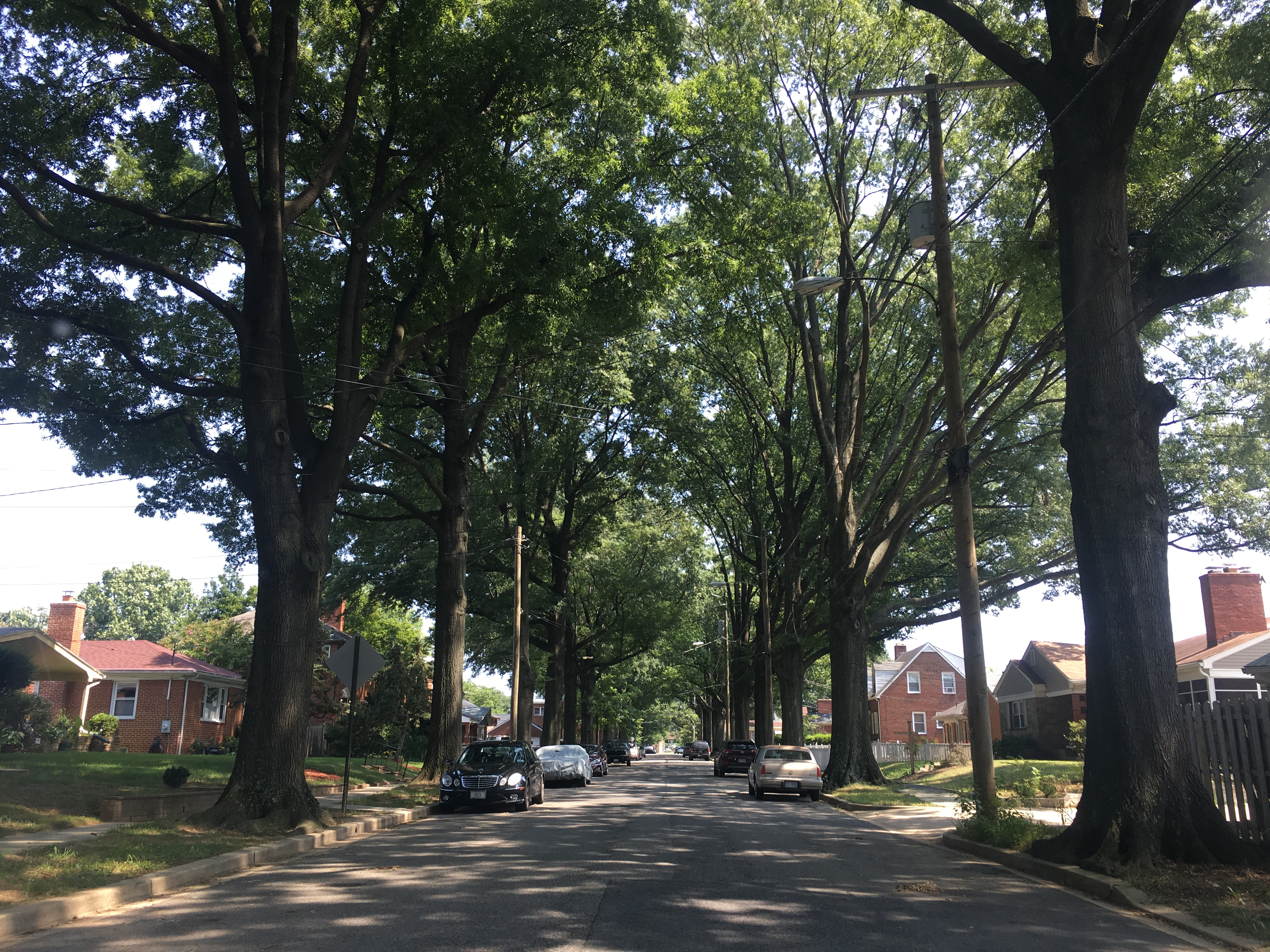
Eastland Gardens neighborhood at the intersection of Lee St. and Lane Pl in August 2018

Eastland Gardens is a small residential neighborhood, located in northeast Washington, D.C. It is bounded by Eastern Avenue NE to the north, the Watts Branch Tributary to the south, CSX Transportation tracks to the east and the Anacostia River to the west.

Eastland Gardens is in Ward Seven of Washington, D.C. Many of its 300 homes were designed by African-American architects or constructed by African-American builders including Lewis W. Giles Sr., John B. Holloway Jr., James Alonzo Plater, and Romulus C. Archer. Development began in 1927.
