= Jason F Beans =

Entrepreneur

Jason F. Beans
- Born: December 20, 1969 (age 56); South Carolina
- Education: Boston College
- Occupation: Entrepreneur
- Employer: Rising Medical Solutions
- Title: President/CEO of Rising Medical Solutions

Jason F. Beans (born December 20, 1969) is an American-based entrepreneur and the President/CEO Rising Medical Solutions; a Chicago, Illinois-based healthcare management company.

== Early life and education ==
Jason Beans was born in South Carolina. His parents entered the Peace Corps and trained in Spanish in Puerto Rico before being deployed to Venezuela. Upon return, Jason spent time in Atlanta, Georgia and Silver Spring, Maryland, before his family moved to Northern Virginia. Jason graduated from J. E. B. Stuart High School in Falls Church, Virginia. He then went to Boston College to study finance and general business from where he graduated with a Finance degree. Jason also graduated from the MIT/EO Entrepreneurial Masters Program.

== Career ==
In 1999, Beans founded Rising Medical Solutions.

Prior to Rising Medical, Jason was the National Director of Property and Casualty Operations at Concentra, and was a founding principal of BND Operations Company, a medical Management Consultancy. Jason is a contributor and consultant for the Rhode Island Workers’ Compensation Medical Fee Schedule rules, which Rising Medical Solutions still updates and publishes today.

In 2010, Beans was awards Smart Business Magazine's Smart Leader Awards. In 2013, Beans was a Midwest Finalist for Ernst & Young Entrepreneur of the Year Award.

Beans sits on the boards of directors of several organizations, and he is an adjunct professor at the University of Florida.
