= Steve Clark (defensive back) =

American football player (born 1962)

No. 36
- Position: Defensive back

Personal information
- Born: December 14, 1962 (age 63); Arlington, Virginia, U.S.
- Listed height: 6 ft 2 in (1.88 m)
- Listed weight: 190 lb (86 kg)

Career information
- High school: Falls Church
- College: Liberty
- NFL draft: 1986: undrafted

Career history
- Buffalo Bills (1986–1987)

Career NFL statistics
- Interceptions: 1
- Stats at Pro Football Reference

Steven Clark (born December 14, 1962) is an American former professional football player who was a defensive back for the Buffalo Bills of the National Football League (NFL) in 1987. He played college football for the Liberty Flames.
