= Saint Paul African Union Methodist Church =

Historic church in Washington, D.C., United States

- U.S. National Register of Historic Places
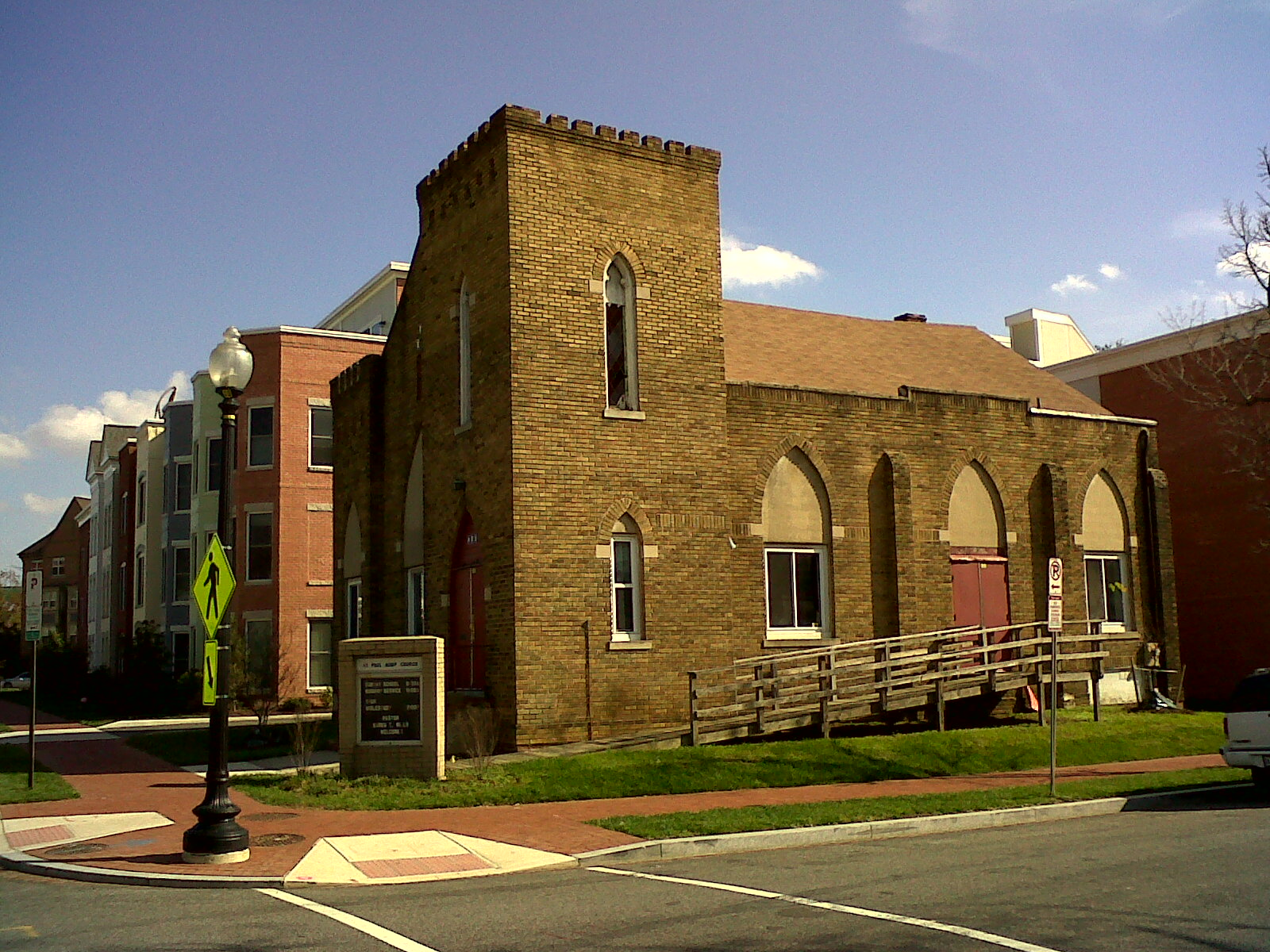

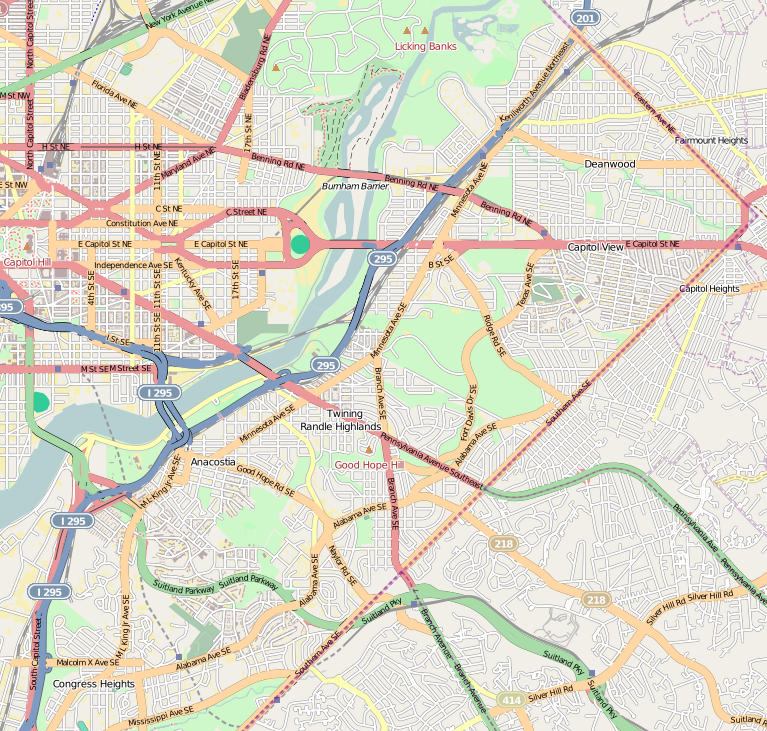
- Location within Washington, D.C. Location within the District of Columbia Location within the United States
- Location: 401 I St., SE. Washington, D.C.
- Coordinates: 38°52′45″N 77°0′2″W
- Built: 1924
- Architect: R.C. Archer Jr.
- Architectural style: Gothic Revival
- NRHP reference No.: 11000481
- Added to NRHP: July 28, 2011

Saint Paul African Union Methodist Church is an historic structure located in the Navy Yard section of Washington, D.C., United States. It is the only congregation in the District of Columbia of the oldest incorporated, independent African- American denomination in the country. It was listed on the National Register of Historic Places in 2011.

== History ==
The African Union Methodist Protestant Church congregation that became Saint Paul's began as a prayer group in 1900. The church was designed by R.C. Archer, Jr., the second licensed African American architect in Washington. It was his first church commission in the city. The Gothic Revival style building was completed in 1924. Saint Paul's is the only church that survives from a predominantly working-class African-American neighborhood in the Navy Yard area. It is also one of the area's last surviving buildings from the first part of the 20th century. In the 1940s, 700 units of public housing were built in the area. In the early 21st century, mixed-income townhomes have replaced the rest of the historic structures surrounding the church.
