= Justice High School =

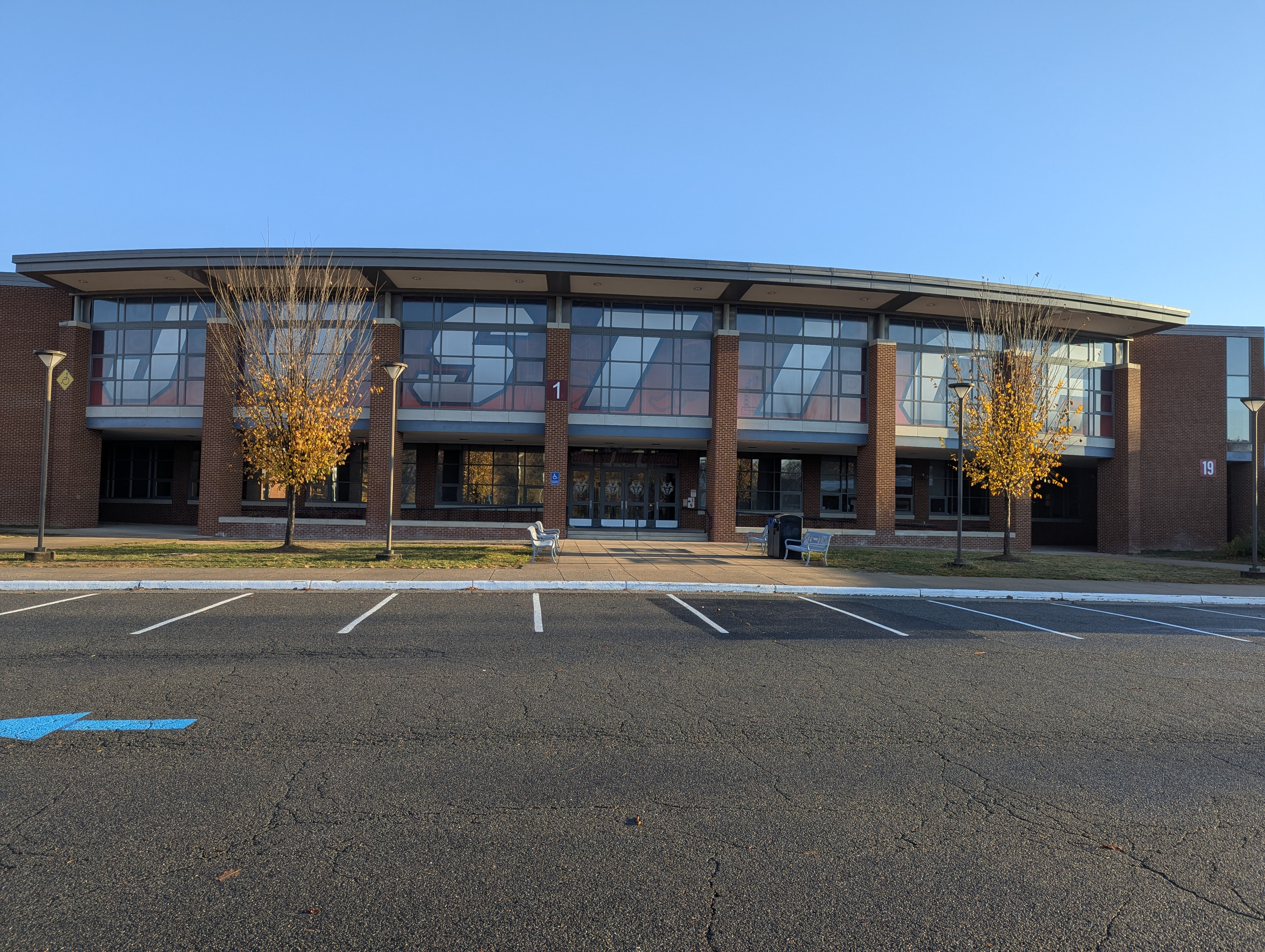

Location
- 3301 Peace Valley Lane; Falls Church address, Virginia 22044; 38°51′25″N 77°9′0″W

Information
- Former name: J.E.B Stuart High School
- School type: Public, high school
- Founded: 1959
- School district: Fairfax County Public Schools
- Principal: Sean Rolon
- Staff: 170
- Grades: 9–12
- Enrollment: 2,191 (May 2019)
- Language: English
- Campus: Suburban
- Colors: Red; White; Navy Blue
- Mascot: Wolves
- Newspaper: The Verdict
- Feeder schools: Glasgow Middle School
- Athletic conferences: National District; Northern Region
- Website: https://justicehs.fcps.edu/

Justice High School (formerly known as J.E.B. Stuart High School) is a high school in the Lake Barcroft census-designated place, Virginia. The school is part of the Fairfax County Public Schools district. The school has a Falls Church address but is not located within the limits of the City of Falls Church. Per a vote of the county school board, the school was renamed Justice High School effective July 1, 2018.

== History ==
In 1968, the first eight of the JEB Stuart Crew Club travelled to the United Kingdom to participate in the Henley Royal Regatta where they won the Princess Elisabeth Challenge Cup. Instituted in 1946 for public schools in the UK, the PE Challenge Cup was opened to overseas entries in 1964 and JEB Stuart became the third US crew to win the event.

In 1997 the school had one computer for every eight students, which changed to one computer for every 1.8 students in 2003. The school has been featured in National Geographic magazine.

In 2006, then-principal Mel Riddile, former director of Straight, Inc., drug rehabilitation program for teens, was chosen as the principal of the year by the National Association of Secondary School Principals. Riddile moved to T. C. Williams High School in neighboring Alexandria City at the end of the 2005–2006 school year.

After 40 years at Stuart, veteran math department chair Stu Singer retired in protest when Stuart administrators dismantled a remedial math program that had given Stuart the highest pass rate in the county. Singer later published a book on the program. Singer labeled the dismantling of this program "education malpractice that can only be described as unconscionable." Math scores plummeted after the reorganization. Other successful programs were also dismantled. Faculty morale fell to the lowest in the county, and many teachers retired or transferred out in protest. In 2014, the district sent a support team to Stuart to help the beleaguered administration.

In May 2024, Sean Rolon was named as the next principal of Justice High School, effective June 20. Rolon previously served as an assistant principal at Falls Church High School and McLean High School.

=== Name and controversy ===
In 1959 when the school opened, the Fairfax County school board opposed racial integration of its schools, and the name, J. E. B. Stuart High School, reflected the school board's sentiments. In 2015 seniors at the school started a drive to rid Fairfax County Public Schools of names honoring the Confederacy and segregation. So on after, many alumni, including prominent names like actress Julianne Moore and film producer Bruce Cohen, joined a petition asking that the name of the school be changed because the honor to Confederate general J. E. B. Stuart was chosen to defy the movement to desegregate public schools after Brown v. Board of Education.

On September 16, 2017, residents of the school area participated in a non-binding vote on new name options, and were able to rank their top three choices. Top choices received five points, second place choices three, and third place choices one. Stuart High School received the most votes. This was heavily concentrated in first-place and seemed to be a polarizing choice. Under the rules established by FCPS, each household was allowed to cast one vote, regardless of the number of members. Later, some board members expressed concern with the Thurgood Marshall name as a possibility as there was already a Marshall High School in the county, named after George C. Marshall. Justice High was then proposed and finalized and an alternative to J.E.B.Stuart High.

On October 26, 2017, the school board approved the name Justice High School with a 7–4 vote; one board member described this as a compromise name that collectively honored Thurgood Marshall, Barbara Rose Johns, and Louis Gonzaga Mendez, Jr., among others who worked towards justice. The name change was implemented in summer 2018.

== Demographics ==
In 2001, Justice High School had "one of the most ethnically diverse student populations in the country." In September 2015 the student body was 50.3% Hispanic/Latino (any race), 23.4% White, 13.6% Asian, 10.1% Black/African American, 2.4% two or more races, and 0.2% American Indian/Alaska Native.

== Notable alumni ==
- Jason F Beans, entrepreneur, founder of Rising Medical Solutions
- Mike Bragg, former NFL punter
- Bruce Cohen, film producer, best known for Silver Linings Playbook, American Beauty
- Patricia A. Dean, former deputy clerk of the U.S. Supreme Court
- Charlie Garner, former NFL running back, drafted by the Philadelphia Eagles in the second round of the 1994 NFL draft
- John Geer, killed during an armed stand off by Fairfax County Police Department
- John Hartman, founder and drummer of rock band The Doobie Brothers
- Anna Heilferty, NWSL soccer player for Washington Spirit, United States U23
- Jamie Gray Hyder, actress, voice actress, best known for True Blood, Law & Order, SVU, Call of Duty: Infinite Warfare
- Julianne Moore, actress, best known for The Lost World: Jurassic Park, The Hunger Games
- Penny Moore, former WNBA basketball player
- Jim O'Brien, American Basketball Association player
- Lola Ogunnaike, entertainment journalist
- Esam Omeish, former president of the Muslim American Society
- Raul Rivero and Mauricio Rivero, members of the pop rock band Crash Boom Bang
- David Pruiksma, animator, best known for his work for The Walt Disney Company
- Jim Sanborn, sculptor best known for creating the Kryptos sculpture at the CIA headquarters
- Tom Shadyac, director, best known for Ace Ventura: Pet Detective, The Nutty Professor
- Ryan Shane, professional tennis player
- Franz Stahl, guitarist for hardcore punk band Scream and alternative rock band Foo Fighters
- Roger Stillwell, former NFL defensive lineman
