= Freeman Store and Museum (Vienna, Virginia) =

Historic commercial building in Virginia, United States

- Freeman Store
- U.S. National Register of Historic Places
- Virginia Landmarks Register
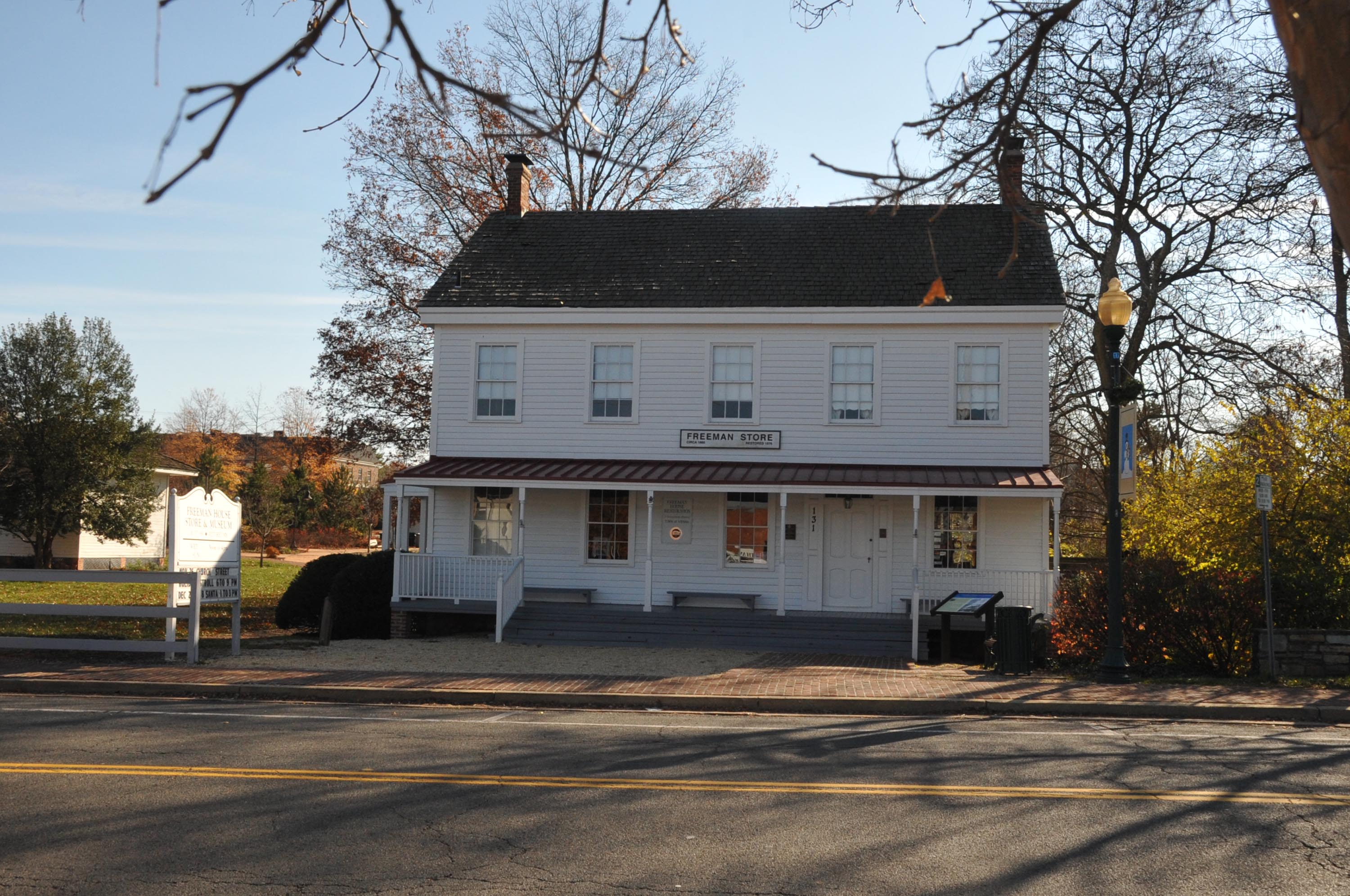

- Location within Virginia
- Location: 131 Church Street Northeast, Vienna, Virginia
- Coordinates: 38°54′12″N 77°15′54″W
- Built: 1859
- NRHP reference No.: 11000834
- VLR No.: 153-0002

Significant dates
- Added to NRHP: May 12, 2012
- Designated VLR: September 22, 2011

The Freeman House Store, formerly the Lydecker Store, is a historic general store located in the Town of Vienna in Fairfax County, Virginia. The house lies in Northern Virginia near the District of Columbia. Built in 1859 for Abram Lydecker, both Confederate and Union Army troops occupied the house during the American Civil War. The house has been restored in accordance with historical records. Civil War paraphernalia are sold in a restored general store on the first floor of the house. A museum on the second floor of the house displays Civil War artifacts.

== Location ==
The Freeman House Store and Museum is located in the town of Vienna in Fairfax County, Virginia on Church Street. The house takes up approximately 0.83 acres (0.34 ha), while the entire property took up six acres when Abram Lydecker purchased it. As the house is less than twenty miles from Washington, D.C., its location was important during the Civil War. The Alexandria, Loudoun & Hampshire Railroad constructed a line through Vienna, creating large growth for the town and Lydecker's business. The Washington & Old Dominion Railroad Trail now travels along the railroad's route, south of the house.

== Building ==
The Freeman House is a two-story, five-bay frame house. It has white paneling with a full-width front porch. It has an off-center entrance slightly to the right. On each side of the house is a chimney, which can be observed through the exterior. On the right side of the house a man-made bridge was built for pedestrians crossing over the creek from the house to the railroad. Originally built in 1859, the house has gone through restorations.

After the house was inherited by Leon Freeman in 1911, he started making changes. Through 1975 through 1977 a major restoration was made. Throughout its many uses, the top floor was used as the living quarters and is now the museum. The bottom floor acted as the general store and post office.

== Historical background ==
=== Lydecker family ===
The Freeman House was originally built in 1859 for Abram Lydecker, an immigrant from New Jersey. The top floor acted as the living area, and the bottom was the store that sufficed as Vienna's post office and fire department. Lydecker owned and operated the store/house until he and his family fled when the Civil War reached the area.

=== Civil War uses ===
In 1861, the house was the polling place for the secession vote. A vacant house in its location was a perfect headquarters for the Confederacy, and later the Union. For both sides, the house acted as a hospital and offices. After the war moved on and ended, the Lydeckers moved back into the house.

=== Freeman family ===
In 1872 Lydecker's son-in-law, Anderson Freeman, moved into the house with his wife and family and helped operate the family business. The store was transferred to Freeman, and then to his son Leon Freeman.

Leon Lydecker Freeman was an active member of the town of Vienna. He was handed down the family business at the age of eighteen. He attended public education provided by the county and at Bethel Military Academy. He then attended the Spencerian Business College in Washington D.C. His accomplishments include serving as the first president of the Vienna Volunteer Fire Department and as a member of the Town Council, including three years as mayor. After passing the house down to his wife, Hattie Belle, it was passed to their daughter Dorothy. In 1969 she sold the home to the town of Vienna. The town then began the restorations and changes.

== Today ==
The town of Vienna owns the Freeman House and Museum, which the town and Historic Vienna, Inc., jointly operate. The building has been restored and now includes Civil War artifacts and a small museum. The house sells a wide assortment of toys, gifts, town- and Virginia-related souvenirs and old-fashioned candy on the first floor, has the museum and administrative offices on the second floor, and operates the Used Book Cellar in the basement which is open whenever the store is open. It holds tours by appointment only by volunteers of Historic Vienna Inc. The house is open to the general public from Wednesday through Sunday from 12:00 noon to 4:00 p.m. It is closed during the months of January and February, but visits are available by appointment.

Many exhibits have been staged over the years. Exhibits on World War II, the American Civil War, the local railroad (which ran from 1855 to 1968), and most recently World War I have been well received. In 2019, Historic Vienna told the story of the Town of Vienna in the 1950s. Elements of the exhibit featured how the town looked, the local businesses, period clothing, a working television set, radios, 1950s model cars and trains, music, movies and other items of interest.

Today the surrounding area of the Freeman House still has its historical context of small local businesses and unique fairs. All of the outhouses that were once part of the estate have now been demolished.

== Recognitions ==
On September 22, 2011, the Virginia Department of Historic Resources placed the Freeman Store on the Virginia Landmarks Register. It is the only structure in Vienna to hold this designation. On April 21, 2012 the Vienna community unveiled a plaque commemorating the Freeman Store's inclusion on the register.

The National Park Service listed the Freeman Store on the National Register of Historic Places on May 15, 2012.
