= Rich Sauveur =

American baseball player (born 1963)

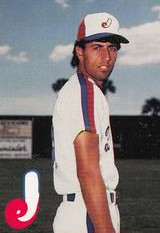
- Sauveur in 1988
- Pitcher
- Born: November 23, 1963 (age 62); Arlington, Virginia, U.S.
- Batted: Left Threw: Left

MLB debut
- July 1, 1986, for the Pittsburgh Pirates

Last MLB appearance
- June 18, 2000, for the Oakland Athletics

MLB statistics
- Win–loss record: 0–1
- Earned run average: 6.07
- Strikeouts: 28
- Stats at Baseball Reference

Teams
- Pittsburgh Pirates (1986); Montreal Expos (1988); New York Mets (1991); Kansas City Royals (1992); Chicago White Sox (1996); Oakland Athletics (2000)

Richard Daniel Sauveur (born November 23, 1963) is an American professional baseball pitcher and pitching coach. He played in Major League Baseball across six seasons for the Pittsburgh Pirates, Montreal Expos, New York Mets, Kansas City Royals, Chicago White Sox, and Oakland Athletics from 1986 to 2000. He then became a pitching coach, working for several minor league teams from 2003 to 2019.

== Playing career ==
Sauveur is from Falls Church, Virginia. He played for the local Falls Church Babe Ruth League team. He attended Falls Church High School and the State College of Florida, Manatee–Sarasota, where he played college baseball for one year. The Pittsburgh Pirates selected Sauveur in the 11th round, with the 253rd overall selection, of the 1983 Major League Baseball draft. He received a $5,000 signing bonus.

Sauveur pitched in Minor League Baseball and learned to throw a knuckleball in 1986. He made his major league debut on July 1, 1986, as a starting pitcher against the Philadelphia Phillies. In 6 2/3 innings pitched, Sauveur allowed two runs. Sauveur then made two more starts for the Pirates, his only major league starts, before being demoted to the minor leagues. He broke his foot late in the 1986 season, and was not invited to spring training by the Pirates in 1987. He pitched in the minor leagues in 1987, and was selected by the Montreal Expos in the Rule 5 draft after the 1987 season. He pitched in four major league games for the Expos as a relief pitcher in 1988. During the 1989 season, he required surgery to remove a bone spur. During the 1990 season, he suffered a broken finger when he was hit by a line drive off of the bat of Vinny Castilla.

In 1991, Sauveur returned to major leagues, making six relief appearances for the New York Mets. He also played in eight games for the Kansas City Royals in 1992, earning his only decision (a loss) during that time. In 1993, Sauveur played in the Mexican League. He became a replacement player during the 1994–95 Major League Baseball strike, when the Cincinnati Reds guaranteed him a $105,000 salary, after he typically earned $35,000 per year. He played in the major leagues for the Chicago White Sox in 1996, then was released by the Los Angeles Dodgers organization in spring training in 1997. He caught on with the Chicago Cubs weeks later, pitching in the minor leagues for the season. He also pitched for the Oakland Athletics in 2000. Sauveur retired after the 2000 season with a 0–1 win–loss record, a 6.07 earned run average, 1.78 walks plus hits per inning pitched, and 21 strikeouts in 24 appearances in the major leagues. He is the only major league pitcher to pitch for six teams without earning a win.

== Coaching career ==
In 2003, Sauveur became the pitching coach for the Milwaukee Brewers organization. He coached the Beloit Snappers of the Class A Midwest League in 2003 and 2004 and then coached the Huntsville Stars of the Double-A Southern League for three years. In 2008, Sauveur joined the Boston Red Sox' organization as the pitching coach for the Pawtucket Red Sox of the Triple-A International League. He also coached the Águilas Cibaeñas of the Dominican Professional Baseball League during the winter. The Red Sox passed over Sauveur for the major league team's pitching coach role in three consecutive seasons, and he left the Red Sox organization. He did not coach in 2015 but joined the Arizona Diamondbacks' organization to coach the Kane County Cougars of the Midwest League from 2016 through 2018. He joined the Arizona League Diamondbacks coaching staff for the 2019 season. In 2022, Sauveur became a coach at IMG Academy.

== Personal life ==
Sauveur has been married and divorced twice. He has a son with his first wife. Sauveur's father, Dan, worked as an auto mechanic after passing on an opportunity to try out for the Brooklyn Dodgers in the 1940s.

== See also ==
- List of Major League Baseball replacement players
