= Louise Archer =

American teacher and activist

Louise A. Reeves Archer
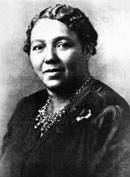
- Louise Archer
- Born: October 23, 1893; Fayetteville, North Carolina, U.S.
- Died: April 1, 1948 (aged 54); Durham, North Carolina, U.S.
- Burial place: Arlington National Cemetery
- Education: Morgan State College
- Occupations: Educator, activist
- Spouse: Romulus C. Archer Jr.

Louise A. Reeves Archer (October 23, 1893 – April 1, 1948) was an American teacher, principal, and activist who fought to educate African Americans during the 1930s and 1940s. During this era, racial barriers severely limited a black student's access to education. These students had limited resources compared to white children and were typically denied education beyond the seventh grade, even as twelve grades became common practice elsewhere.

== Early life ==
Archer was born in Fayetteville, North Carolina, in 1893. She grew up in North Carolina and attended Livingstone College. She taught school in Southampton County, Virginia, where she married Romulus C. Archer Jr. in 1915. They moved to Washington, D.C., in 1922, and she continued her education, later earning a B.S. from Morgan State College.

== Career in education ==
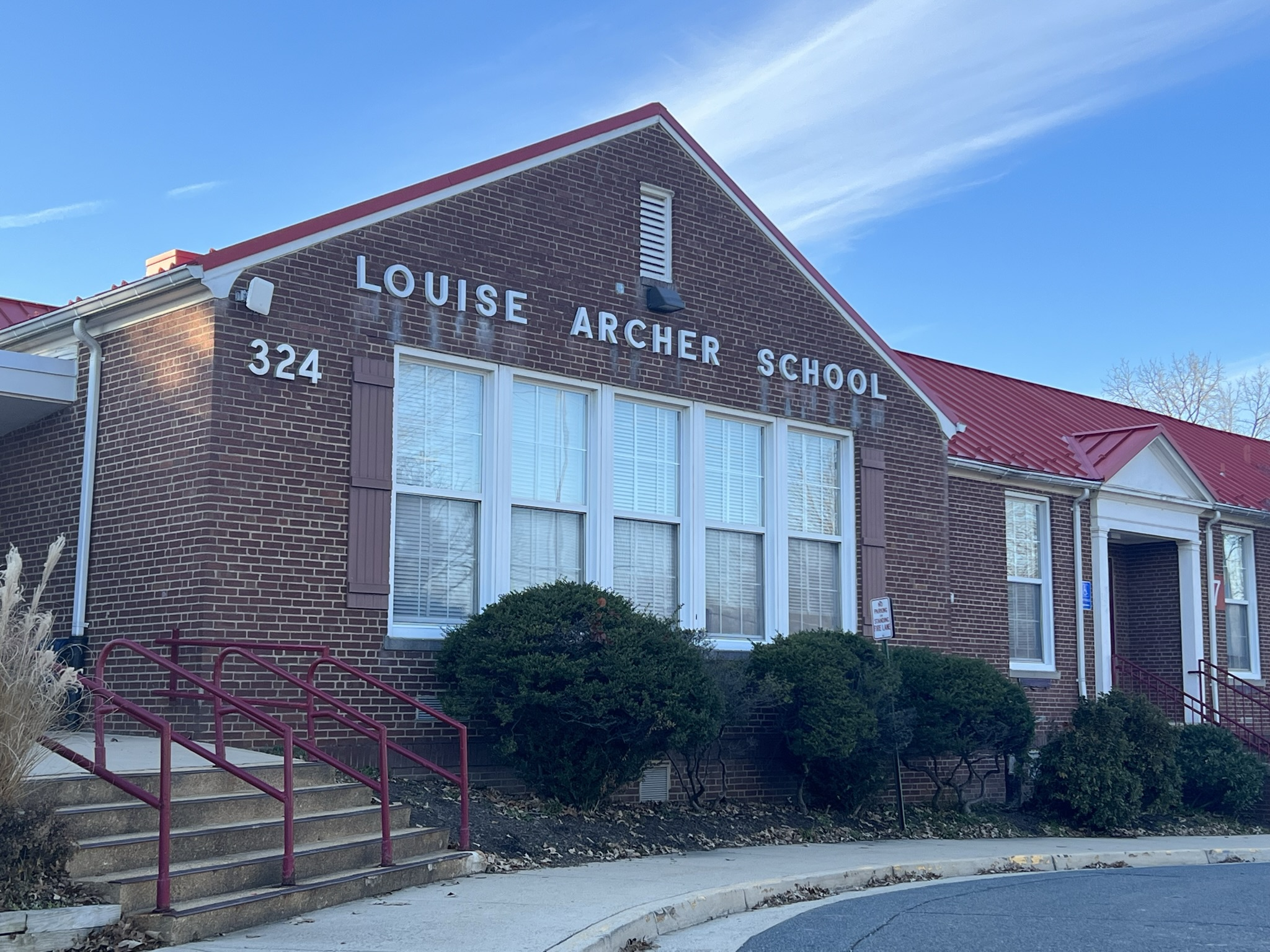
Louise Archer Elementary School, December 2022

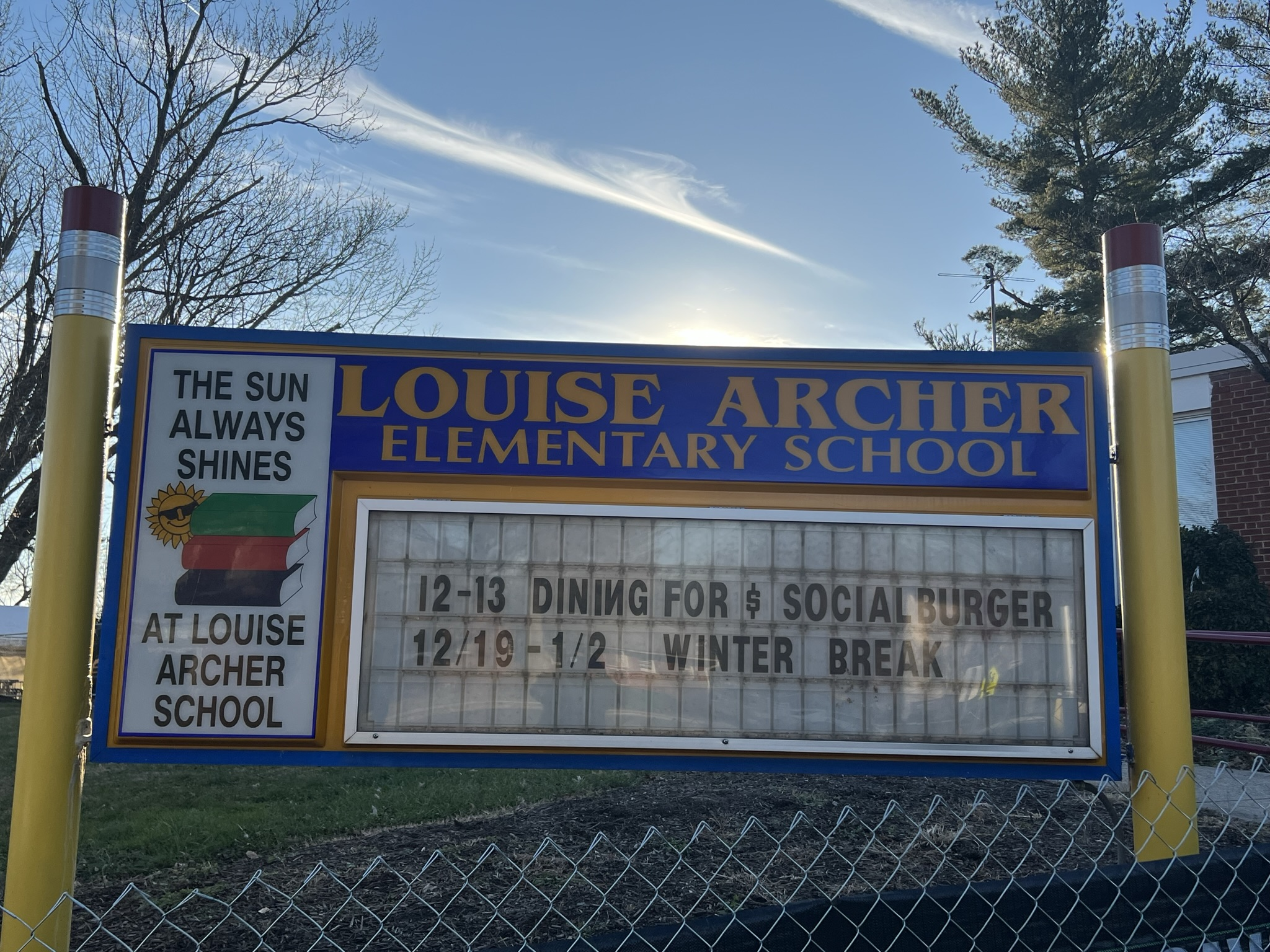
Louise Archer Elementary School sign, December 2022

In 1922, Archer became teacher and principal for a one-room segregated school in Vienna, Virginia, known as the Vienna Colored School. Archer often personally transported children to school and dedicated herself to improving their learning experience. She organized a parent-teacher association to raise funds for supplies and a new building, which opened in 1939 with three rooms.

In 1941, students, parents, and faculty raised $300, which covered the costs of a music teacher, bus expenses, kitchen supplies, and the installation of electric lights. Archer also established one of Fairfax County, Virginia's earliest 4-H Clubs for African Americans, and her students participated in garden projects to grow vegetables for lunches prepared at school.

Archer ensured a high-quality education. In addition to the academic curriculum, she taught sewing, cooking, music, and poetry to her students in fifth through seventh grades, which was then the highest level of public education available to African Americans in the county.

== Death and legacy ==
In 1948, Archer died of a heart attack while visiting family in Durham, North Carolina. She was buried in Arlington National Cemetery.

Following Archer's death, families petitioned the county to rename the Vienna Colored School in her honor. The school was renamed Louise Archer Elementary School in 1950. She is remembered for her "tireless efforts to improve the opportunities for her students in the 1920s and '30s".

== External ==
- Arlington National Cemetery
- Louise Archer Elementary School website
