= James Madison High School (Virginia) =

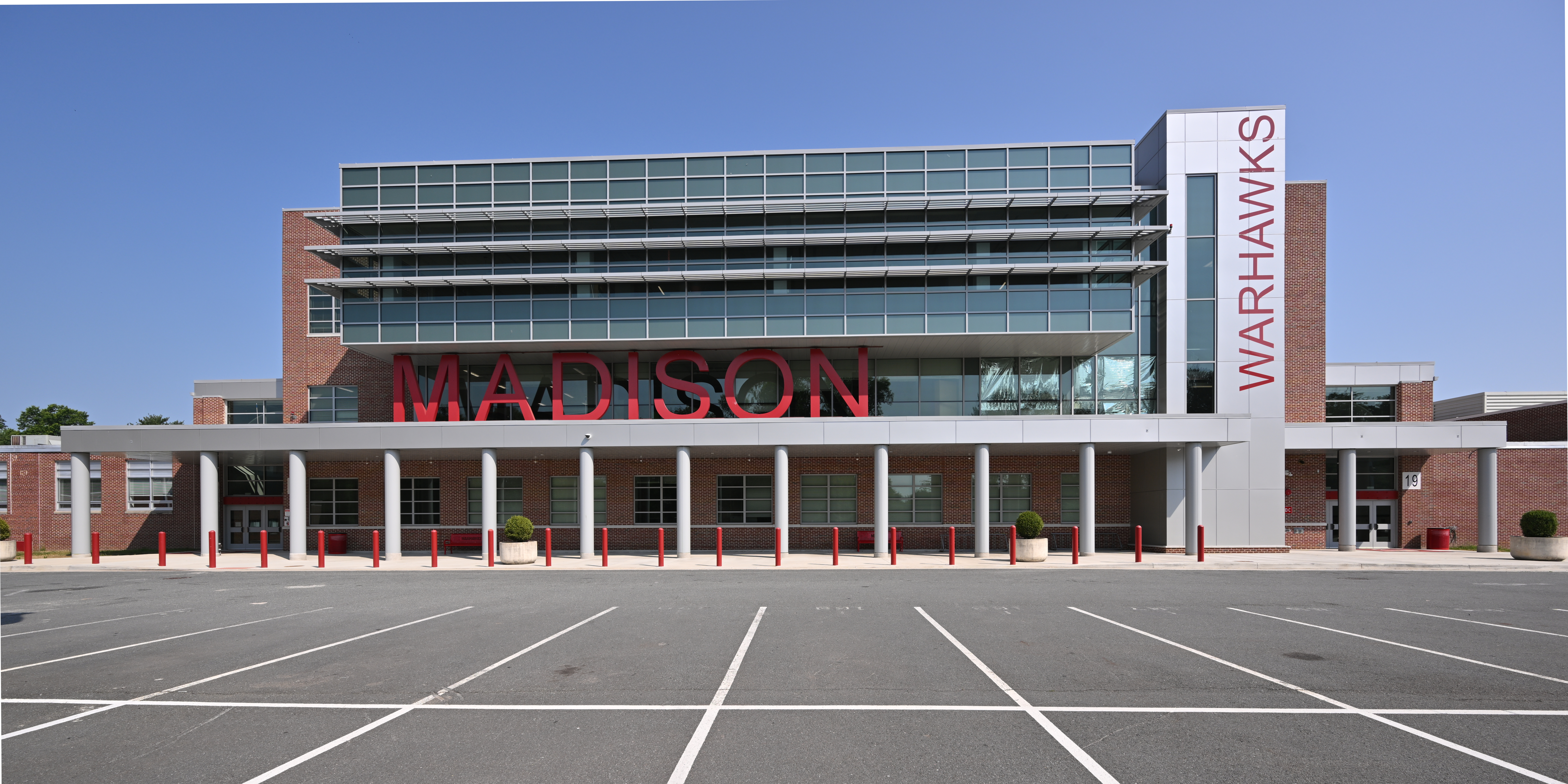

Location
- 2500 James Madison Drive; Vienna, Virginia 22181; United States; 38°53′45″N 77°16′44″W

Information
- Other name: JMHS
- Type: Public high school
- Established: 1959
- School district: Fairfax County Public Schools
- NCES School ID: 510126000532
- Principal: Liz Calvert
- Teaching staff: 141.71 (on an FTE basis)
- Grades: 9–12
- Enrollment: 2,090 (2024–25)
  - Grade 9: 524
  - Grade 10: 530
  - Grade 11: 507
  - Grade 12: 529
- Student to teacher ratio: 15.17(2024–25)
- Campus type: Suburban
- Colors: Red and black
- Athletics conference: Concorde District; AAA Northern Region
- Mascot: Warhawk
- Nickname: Warhawks
- Newspaper: The Hawk Talk
- Website: madisonhs.fcps.edu

James Madison High School is an American public high school in Vienna, Virginia and is a part of the Fairfax County Public Schools. As of the 2024-2025 school year, it had 2,090 students attending and a graduation rate of 96%

According to Newsweek magazine's 2014 list of the top U.S. high schools, Madison was ranked 93rd. U.S. News & World Report named it a Silver Medal school in 2010, and in 2025, ranked it 356th among national public schools.

US News High School Rank
Year	National	State	County
2025-26	356	10	7
2024-25	273	9	6
2023-24	719	12	7
2022-23	361	8	7

Elementary schools feeding Madison include Wolftrap, Vienna, Louise Archer, Flint Hill, Marshall Road, and Cunningham Park. Middle schools feeding Madison include Thoreau and Kilmer. These schools make up the "Madison Pyramid". Freedom Hill ES, Oakton ES, Westbriar ES and Luther Jackson MS also send students to Madison on occasion.

== History ==
James Madison High School was opened in September 1959, headed by its first principal, Elton A. Bonner, and its first Vice Principals, Elam Hertzler and George Dozier. Madison began as a segregated high school and was integrated in 1960 thanks to the implementation of the Brown v Board of Education decision. Of the first students to be transferred were Phyllis and Preston Blackwell.

The original student governing body was the SCA, which stands for Student Cooperative Association. Homerooms would elect 2 representatives to it each year and it ran welfare programs and fundraising campaigns.

Since 1959, the school has undergone 4 renovations with the newest being completed in the spring of 2022. The first of these renovations was completed in the schools first 6 years of operation under Mr. Bonner. It added English huts, new football lights, portable bleachers, baseball dugouts, and an entire new wing to accommodate the growing student population.

While not an official renovation, in 1967, the school received a lot of new equipment to modernize the school. The science department greatly benefited from this, adding many new labs to its collection. Through this modernization, Madison became one of the first schools in Fairfax County to acquire a device that could pinpoint the ideal university for a student to attend based on conditions they inputed.

In 2003, the 3rd renovation introduced a new library including a state-of-the-art computer lab that was added to the front of the building. Many county officials including past school principals attended the opening ceremony. In 2022, the 23.5 million dollar renovation replaced the library from 2003 with a modern, 3-story addition and renovated the cafeteria in the back. This new 32,000 square foot addition placed the library on the 3rd floor, freeing up the floors below for more teaching spaces. At the same time, Madison's football stadium received a major upgrade with its track being completely redone.

Madison's Past Principals
Elton A. Bonner	1959 - 1968
Shelton T. Belsches	1968 - 1971
Taylor Williams	1971 - 1972
Clarence Drayer	1972 - 1977
George Felton	1977 - 1981
Norman F. Bradford	1981 - 1989

== Demographics ==
In the 2024-25 school year, James Madison High School's student body was 58.11% White, 16.13% Asian, 16.08% Hispanic, 1.97% Black and 7.70% Other.

== Academics ==
=== Curriculum ===
James Madison High School allows students to take a wide range of core and elective classes at various levels including Standard, Honors, AP, DE, and AV. Electives include many levels of computer science, various engineering courses, psychology, all aspects of performing arts, visual and 3d arts, journalism, yearbook, marketing, entrepreneurship, 3 foreign languages (Spanish, French, and Latin), etc.

Students wanting to take courses not offered at Madison may do so through academy programs at other schools including Marshall, Fairfax, Centreville, and Falls Church.

Madison offers a total of 30 AP courses, with one more being introduced in the 2026-27 school year.

List of AP Courses at Madison
Course	Notes
AP English Lang and Comp	
AP English Lit and Comp	
AP Human Geography	Introduced in the 2025-26 school year
AP World History	
AP United States History	
AP US Gov and Politics	
AP Micro/Macro Economics	Students take both the Micro and Macro exams
AP Business with Personal Finance	To be introduced in the 2026-27 school year
AP Psychology	
AP African American Studies	
AP Precalculus AB/BC	
AP Statistics	
AP Calculus AB	
AP Calculus BC	
AP Comp Science Principles	
AP Comp Science A	
AP Biology	
AP Chemistry	
AP Environmental Science	
AP Physics 1	
AP Physics 2	
AP Physics C: Mechanics	
AP French Lang and Culture	
AP Latin	
AP Spanish Lang and Culture	
AP Studio Art: Drawing	
AP Art: 2-D Digital Art	
AP Art: 2-D Photo	
AP Studio Art: 3-D Design	
AP Capstone 1: Seminar AP Capstone 2: Research	Seminar 10 available for the 2025-26 school year

=== Standardized Testing ===
James Madison High School continually surpasses most Virginia schools in statewide and nationwide exams. For the 2024-25 school year, there was a 95.72% pass rate on English:Reading SOLs, >50% pass rate on English:Writing SOLs, >50% pass rate on History and Social Science, 94.75% pass rate on Mathematics SOLs, and 88.80% pass rate on Science SOLs. In 2025, Madison's average SAT score was 1229/1600.

== Athletics ==
James Madison's sports teams play in the Concorde District and 6A Northern Region. Their traditional rival schools include nearby schools Oakton, Langley, Marshall, Chantilly, and South Lakes.

=== Football ===
The James Madison football team is headed by Coach Justin Counts, and assisted by Coaches Brendan Ginley, Jordan Durham, and Andrew Baird.

Madison Football Rankings
Year	State Ranking	Overall
2025-26	32	9-5
2024-25	9	14-1
2023-24	13	12-2
2022-23	17	11-4
2021-22	10	13-2
2020-21	32	8-1
2019-20	39	8-4
2018-19	21	10-3
2017-18	59	8-4

=== Crew ===
Founded in 2002, the James Madison Rowing team rows out of Sandy Run Regional Park, which is set on the banks of the Occoquan River. Both the men's and women's teams have had a fair amount of success. The women's team holds multiple state championships and went so far as to win the Stotesbury Cup and SRAA National Championship (1V8) in 2013.

== Extracurricular activities ==
=== Marching Band and Concert Band ===
The James Madison High School "Pride of Vienna" Marching Band, under the direction of Michael Hackbarth, won three consecutive Virginia state championships in 2018, 2019 and 2021 as well as being a 4 time Virginia class 5A state champion. They placed 1st at the Bands of America mid-Atlantic regional in 2019 and also attended the 2019 Bands of America Grand National Championships, where they achieved second place in class 3A, placing them at 29th overall in the semifinals. The school is one of the five schools to have earned the Sudler Flag twice. In the 2022 VBODA (Virginia Band & Orchestra Association) assessment, the school's symphonic band achieved perfect grades for grade 4, with its wind symphony achieving the same in grade 6, making it the highest achieving band in the district.

Madison's band has had 4 directors throughout its history, the first being Ralph Hills, who led for 4 years upon the school's founding. Later came Mr. Yole in 1963 who directed the band for 10 years until 1973. Under his leadership, the band grew into two groups, Concert and Symphonic, each performing and receiving superior ratings at concert music festivals. Then, in 1973, Carl (Jeff) Bianchi took over and led the band until 1997. Finally, in 2001, Mr. Hackbarth took over an has been directing the band since.

In the early days of Madison's history, their first colorguard group called the "Majorettes" practiced and performed alongside them during halftime shows. They also competed with other groups independently.

=== Orchestra ===
Under the direction of Erin Eberly, the James Madison High School Orchestra has consistently received Superior Ratings and Best Overall Orchestra awards at local, regional, and national events. The orchestra is divided into 4 ensembles, each requiring annual audition. These ensembles include Chamber Select, Chamber, Philharmonic, and Symphonic.

=== Theater ===
Madison's drama department is currently run by Laura Loy. MAD Drama runs 2 theatrical productions per year: A play in the fall and a musical in the spring. They also run many on-act student-written plays throughout the year.

Madison's Past Productions
Year	Play	Musical
2022-2023	Much Ado About Nothing	Mama Mia
2023-2024	Deadwood Dick	Pippin
2024-2025	Puffs	Mean Girls
2025-2026	A Midsummer Night's Dream	Zombie Prom

=== Newspaper ===
Madison's resident newspaper is The Hawk Talk, run by students and advised by staff. Its first publication was in 1967

== Campus ==
James Madison High School's building, like many others in Fairfax County, is of considerable size, consisting of mostly two floors with a third being added to the new addition in 2022. Like most other high schools, Madison's hallways are divided among subjects with English, History, PE, and the Performing Arts being downstairs, while Science, Math, and World Languages being upstairs.

Beyond the building, Madison's athletic complex consists of 5 fields: a football stadium + track, a baseball field, a softball field, a multipurpose practice field, and 5 tennis courts.

== Notable alumni ==
- John Brenkus, host of ESPN's Sports Science and the podcast "The Brink of Midnight”
- Bob Brower, former professional baseball player, New York Yankees and Texas Rangers
- Valerie Camillo, sports executive, president & CEO of Spectacor Sports & Entertainment
- Akhil Chada, co-founder of Facet Enterprises
- Dana Coons, long distance runner
- Robert DeProspero, former United States Secret Service special agent
- Meghan Douglas, fashion model
- Greg Duncan, diver
- Bryce Eldridge, First Baseman for San Francisco Giants.
- Jay Franklin, former MLB player, pitcher, selected second overall by the San Diego Padres in the 1971 MLB draft
- Azita Ghanizada, actress
- Alia Abu El Hawa, footballer, member of the Jordan women's national team.
- Julia Leas, soccer player
- Mark Jordan Legan, TV writer, NPR contributor, host of the podcast "Film Freaks Forever"
- Adam Bhala Lough, music video director, screenwriter, documentary filmmaker
- Jim McNamara, former MLB player, catcher for the San Francisco Giants
- Robin Reed, former lead news anchor and chief meteorologist at WDBJ-DT
- Robert Shafer, Grammy Award-winning American conductor, classical composer
- Randy Scott, ESPN sportscaster
- Robb Spewak, radio personality on The Don and Mike Show
- Stephen Swartz, electronic music artist
- James Triantos, professional baseball second baseman in the Chicago Cubs organization
- Robyn Vining, former member of the Wisconsin State Assembly from the 14th district, current member of the 13th
- Mike Wallace, former MLB player, drafted by the Philadelphia Phillies in the 4th round of the 1969 draft
- Liam Walsh, co-founder of Facet Enterprises
- Natalie Wynn a.k.a. ContraPoints, YouTuber
- Mia Yim, professional wrestler
- Rob Owen, TV columnist, Pittsburgh Tribune-Review, TribLive.com
