= Louise Archer Elementary School =

Elementary school in Vienna, Virginia

Coordinates: 38°53′56.94″N 77°16′37.88″W

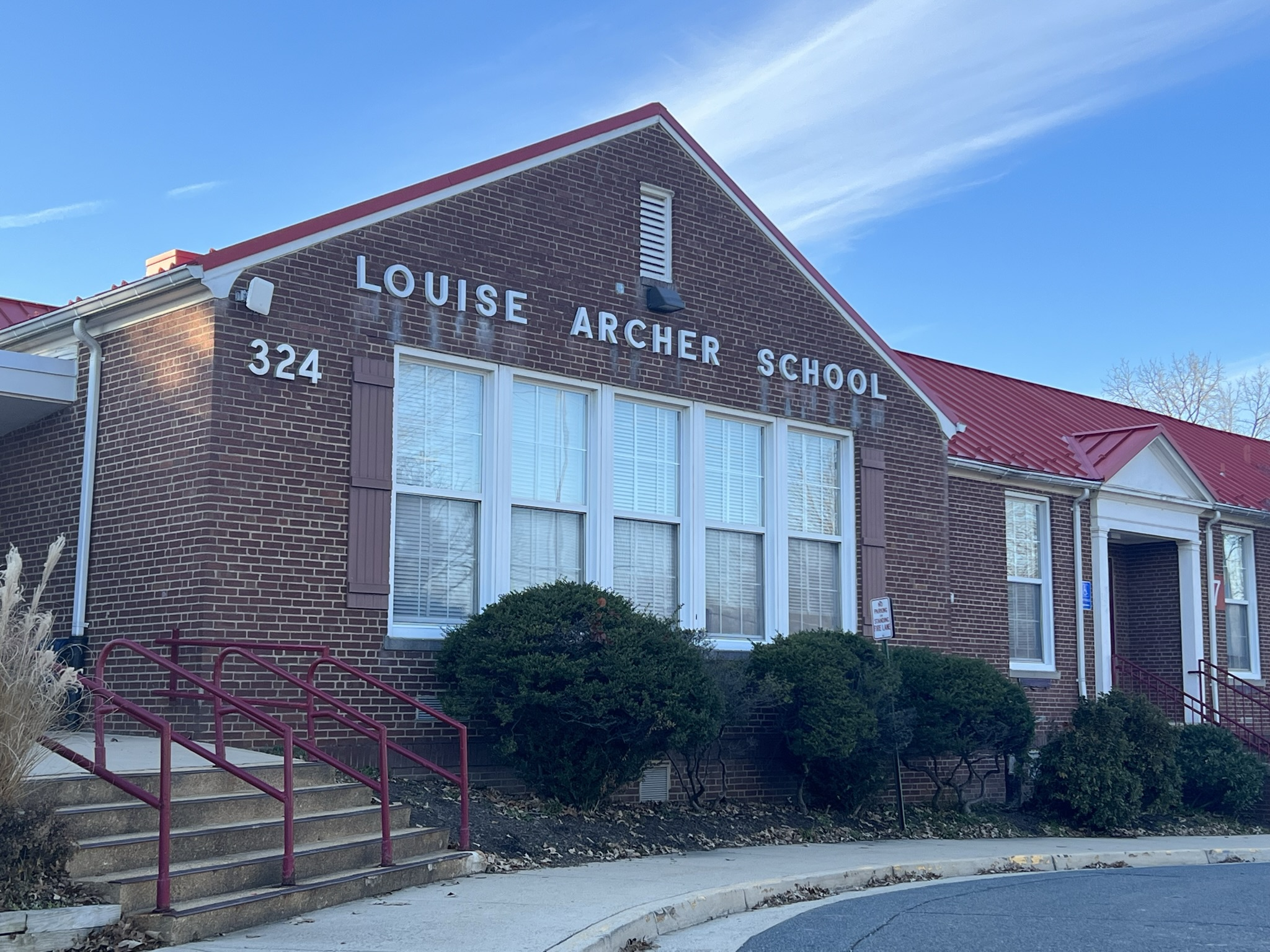
- Louise Archer in December 2022
- 324 Nutley Street N.W. Vienna, Virginia 22180, U.S.

Information
- Type: Public school
- Motto: Where The Sun Always Shines
- Established: 1867
- School district: Fairfax County Public Schools
- NCES District ID: 5101260
- NCES School ID: 510126000529
- Principal: Michelle Makrigiorgos
- Enrollment: 587
- Student to teacher ratio: 14.84
- Colors: Yellow and Blue
- Pyramid: James Madison High School
- Previous name: Vienna Colored School (until 1950)
- Website: http://www.fcps.edu/LouiseArcherES/

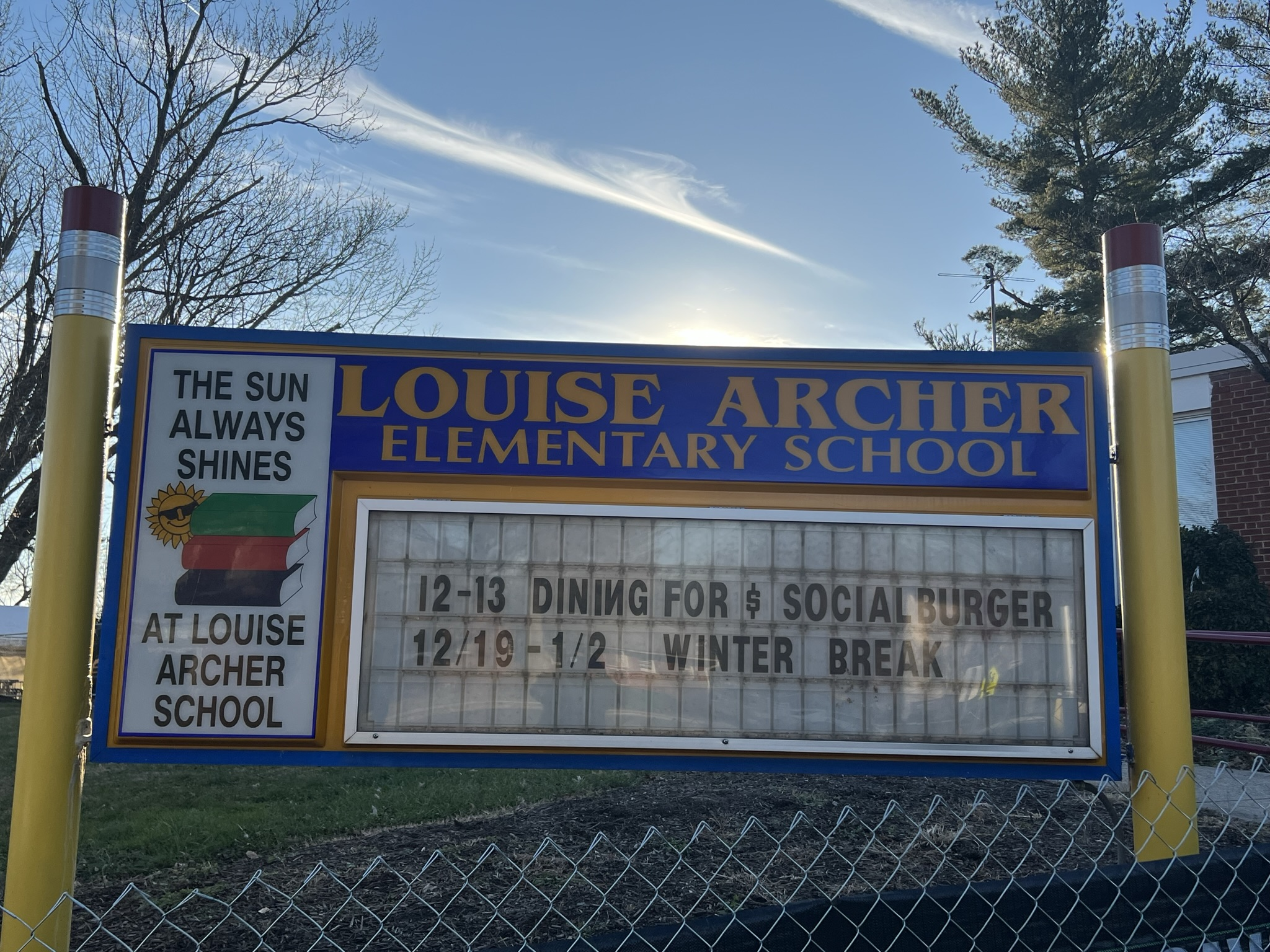
Louise Archer Elementary School sign, Vienna VA, Dec 2022

Louise Archer Elementary School is a public elementary school in Vienna, Virginia, United States, and is part of Fairfax County Public Schools. Founded in 1867 as a school for African-American children, it is designated by Fairfax County as an elementary school center for advanced academic programs.

== History ==
The school was originally established in 1867 as the Vienna Colored School, making it the first school for African-American children in Fairfax County. Prior to its founding, African-American children in the area were required to travel daily to Washington D.C. to attend school. In 1939, the school relocated to its current site, which was then a predominantly Black neighborhood.

Louise Archer served as the school's principal and taught alongside two other teachers. In addition to her instructional duties, she provided meals for all students. During the early 1940s, the school lacked running water, the only available sources was Salisbury Spring, located approximately one mile away. Male students were tasked with fetching water, while Archer prepared meals on a potbellied stove. The original school building now forms part of the northern section of the campus near the cafeteria.

In 1950, the school was officially renamed Louise Archer Elementary School.

In the late 1960s, Duke Ellington and his trio performed at the school at the invitation of the band teacher at that time, Philmore Hall, who had previously been Ellington's trumpet instructor.

== Advanced Academic Program ==
Louise Archer Elementary School offers a level IV Advanced Academics Program (AAP), which begins in the third grade.

== Chess Club ==
During the 2009 school year, the Louise Archer Chess Club earned seven trophies and awards. That year, the school placed third nationally in a spring 2009 tournament and achieved a strong showing in another national chess competition. The school also won the Kent Gardens Cup in the previous year and consecutively from 2005 through 2012.

== WLATV ==
Morning announcements and school news are broadcast on WLATV, a closed-circuit television channel operated by select 6th grade students.

== Notable attendees ==
- Jamie Broumas, jazz singer

== See also ==
- Fairfax County Public Schools
