= Angie Goff =

Korean-born American broadcast journalist

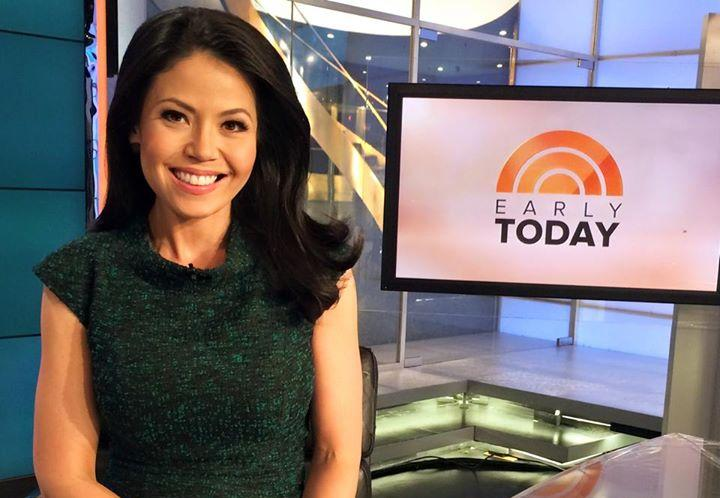
- Goff on the set of Early Today in December 2014.
- Born: Angela Goff; March 17, 1980 (age 46); Seoul, South Korea
- Status: Married
- Education: George Mason University (BA)
- Occupations: Television Journalist; News Anchor at WTTG
- Children: Adora Kate (born December 2, 2010)); Robert IV (born May 31, 2013); Wren (born November 5, 2017)
- Website: www.ohmygoff.com

Angie Goff (born March 17, 1980) is a South Korean-born American broadcast journalist currently at WTTG (locally known as "FOX5") in Washington D.C. Goff also writes the popular blog OhMyGoff known for showcasing viewer generated content. She was also a fill-in anchor for NBC News' Early Today.

== Early life ==
Goff was born and raised in Seoul, South Korea. She spent most of her childhood and teenage years there, and attended the Seoul American High School for her freshman and sophomore years, where she played guard on the basketball team.

In 1995, she moved to Herndon, Virginia and graduated from Herndon High School, where she was senior class president. She earned a Bachelor of Arts degree from George Mason University, where she was a member of Alpha Omicron Pi sorority.

In April 2008, she married Dr. Robert Ellis III, a South Carolina pediatric dentist. They have four children: Adora, Robert IV, Wren, and March.

== Career ==
Her first job in television reporting for public-access television cable TV station Torrance CitiCable while living in Los Angeles, California. During this time Goff served as the personal assistant to Entertainment Tonight anchor Mark Steines. Next, Goff also served as a morning anchor and reporter for CBS affiliate KMEG-TV in Sioux City, Iowa. From 2004 -2007 she next worked in Columbia South Carolina at WIS-TV where she was a news anchor and reporter. While at the Columbia, South Carolina station Goff won a regional Emmy Award.

From 2007 to 2011, she was traffic and entertainment reporter for WUSA, the CBS affiliate in Washington, D.C.

In November 2010, Goff joined DC radio station WVRX, locally known as "105.9 The Edge", as a member of the "Kirk and Mike" morning show hosted by Mike O'Meara and Kirk McEwen.

In August 2011, Goff left WUSA to join WRC-TV (locally known as "NBC4" or "NBC Washington") as a weekend morning anchor and reporter.

According to Capitol File magazine, Goff's website, ohmygoff.tv ranked #2 in Washington, D.C. for top blogs in 2010. Washington Life Magazine named Goff as one of the capital's most influential under 40 residents two years in a row.

Goff was a member of Today show's Parenting Team before her departure from WRC-TV. In this capacity she appeared on the fourth hour of the program discussing parenting topics with Hoda Kotb and Kathie Lee Gifford.

On June 21, 2019, Goff began a weekly joint-podcast/vodcast called "The Oh My Goff Show", broadcast from the Podcast Village Studios in the Georgetown neighborhood of Northwest Washington, D.C.

On July 8, 2019, Goff joined WTTG as a news anchor of the station's newly launched 4pm newscast and the station's 7pm "Like It Or Not" roundtable.
