= Romulus C. Archer =

American architect (1890–1968)

- Born: Romulus Cornelius Archer Jr. March 11, 1890; Norfolk, Virginia, U.S.
- Died: November 29, 1968 (aged 78); Washington, D.C., U.S.
- Burial place: Arlington National Cemetery
- Occupation: Architect
- Spouse: Louise Archer

Romulus Cornelius Archer Jr. (March 11, 1890 – November 29, 1968) was an American architect. An African American, he is credited with designing Virginia University of Lynchburg (originally Lynchburg Baptist Seminary) in Lynchburg, Virginia and Saint Paul African Union Methodist Church in Washington D.C. Both are listed on the National Register of Historic Places.

He was born in Norfolk, Virginia. His father was Romulus Cornelius Archer and his mother Mary Poindexter Archer. He married teacher and civil rights leader Louise Archer in 1915.

Architect James Alonzo Plater began his career working for Archer from 1934 until 1936 before moving to Philadelphia. Architect John B. Holloway Jr. (1913-1983) worked for him briefly circa 1938. Holloway and Archer both designed residences in Eastland Gardens. Archer was featured in Jet with a photograph after he won a merit award from the Washington Board of Trade.

Archer's work included residences, commercial buildings, apartment buildings and churches in the northeast Brookland neighborhood of Washington D.C.

He is buried in Arlington National Cemetery.

== Works ==
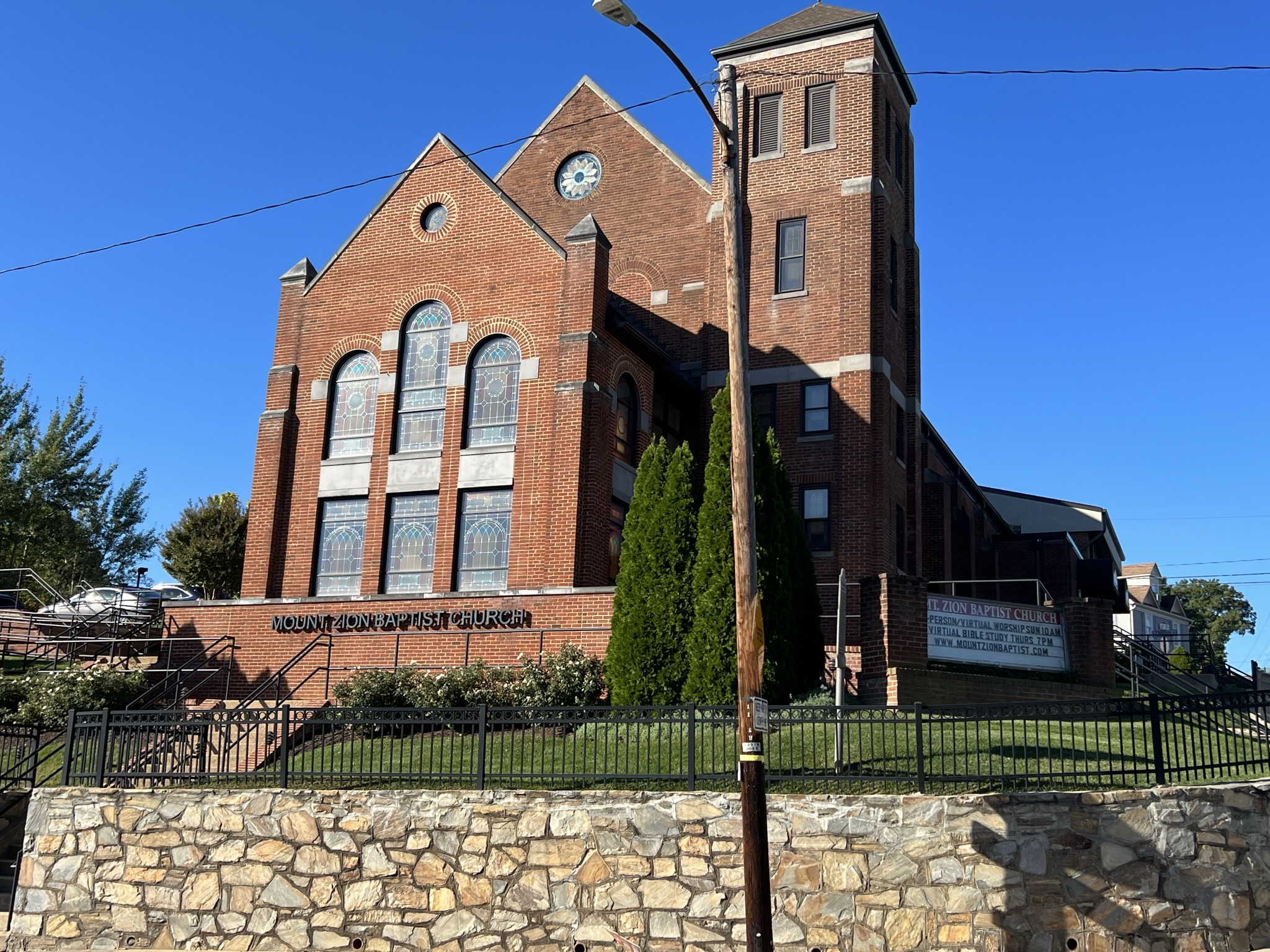
Mount Zion Baptist Church, Arlington VA, in 2022

Selected works include:

- Mount Zion Baptist Church (Arlington, Virginia) (1944).
- Saint Paul African Union Methodist Church (1924), Washington, D.C., which is listed on the National Register of Historic Places
- Virginia University of Lynchburg
