= Roger Stillwell =

American football player (1951–2006)

No. 71
- Position: Defensive end/Defensive tackle

Personal information
- Born: November 17, 1951; Santa Monica, California, U.S.
- Died: February 19, 2006 (aged 54); Novato, California, U.S.
- Listed height: 6 ft 5 in (1.96 m)
- Listed weight: 260 lb (118 kg)

Career information
- High school: Justice (VA)
- College: Stanford
- NFL draft: 1975: 9th round, 212th overall pick

Career history
- Chicago Bears (1975–1978)

Awards and highlights
- First-team All-American (1973); 2× First-team All-Pac-8 (1972, 1973)

Career NFL statistics
- Sacks: 11.5
- Fumble recoveries: 3
- Stats at Pro Football Reference

Roger Howard Stillwell (November 17, 1951 – February 19, 2006) was an American professional football defensive end and defensive tackle in the National Football League (NFL). He played college football for the Stanford Cardinals

== Early life and education ==
Stillwell attended Justice High School, where he lettered in football, basketball, and baseball. As a senior, he received All-Virginia honors in football and basketball.

=== College football career ===
In 1970, he enrolled at the College of Marin, where he played college football for a year before transferring to Stanford University in 1971, where he missed the season with a knee injury.

As a redshirt sophomore in 1972, he received All-Coast honors. As a junior in 1973, he overcame a shoulder injury to make 66 tackles. As a senior in 1974, he had 62 tackles. In 2002, he was inducted into the Stanford University's Athletic Hall of Fame.

== Professional career ==
=== Chicago Bears ===
In the 1975 NFL draft, Stillwell was selected by the Chicago Bears in the ninth round with the 212th overall selection. He was originally drafted with the intention of being converted into an offensive tackle. He missed time in training camp due to illness and a back injury. He started the first 11 games at left defensive tackle, before being passed on the depth chart by Jim Osborne. He was named to the all-Rookie team by United Press International and Football Digest.

In 1976, he moved to right defensive end. He was limited with a left knee sprain during preseason. He started 10 out of 13 games, before missing time with a left knee injury that required surgery.

In 1977, he was moved back to defensive tackle. He only played five games as a backup defensive tackle, before suffering a career-ending left knee injury against the Minnesota Vikings. In 1979, he was released by the Bears.

He played three seasons with the Bears, retiring at age 26 after sustaining multiple knee and back injuries.

== Personal life ==
Stillwell was born into an Air Force family, so he had to live in different places during his youth, including Japan, Hawaii, Alabama, Virginia, and California. He was a volunteer football coach at Novato High School during the mid 1980s.

In 1979, he sued the Chicago Bears for negligence. He suffered from debilitating physical struggles after his football career. He discussed his sports injuries in the 1985 documentary "Disposable Heroes: The Other Side of Football", directed by Bill Couturié.
