= Hughes Middle School =

Hughes Middle School may refer to:

- Hughes Middle School (Long Beach, California)
- Langston Hughes Middle School (Reston, Virginia)
