= Lola Ogunnaike =

Nigerian journalist

- Born: September 13, 1975 (age 50); Virginia, U.S.
- Citizenship: Nigerian American
- Education: (BA) (MFA)
- Alma mater: University of Virginia New York University
- Occupation: Journalist
- Spouse: Deen Solebo
- Children: 1

Lola Ogunnaike (born September 13, 1975) is an American entertainment journalist currently based in Lagos. A former entertainment writer for The New York Times, Ogunnaike has since worked as a freelance media reporter and the host of Couch Surfing, a celebrity interview web series produced by People.

== Early life and education ==
Lola was born in Virginia to Nigerian parents. She graduated from J.E.B. Stuart High School in Fairfax, Virginia. She earned a Bachelor of Arts degree in English literature from the University of Virginia and a Master of Fine Arts in journalism from New York University.

== Career ==
Ogunnaike commenced her career in journalism in 1999 covering entertainment news and pop culture. She then became an entertainment reporter for The New York Times, focusing on celebrities such as Jennifer Lopez, Ozwald Boateng, Oprah Winfrey and writing Sting for the paper's "Arts and Leisure" section.

Ogunnaike was a writer for Vibe, contributing to the monthly music features and cover stories. Her work has also been published in Rolling Stone, New York, Glamour, Details, Nylon, The New York Observer, and V. She also accompanied and interviewed Michelle Obama on a tour to South Africa. Ogunnaike later worked as a features reporter at the New York Daily News, where she covered breaking news on celebrities and entertainment for "NOW," the paper's entertainment section, and for the Rush and Molloy column She was a former correspondent on CNN’s American Morning, where she worked from 2007 to 2009.

Ogunnaike has appeared as a guest on CNN, MSNBC, MTV, VH1, and NBC's Today. She was listed in May 2007 as Ebony’s ‘150 Most Influential Blacks in America”. She is currently a host of Arise Entertainment 360.

== Personal life ==
She is married to Deen Solebo, a business manager at Elektron Petroleum Energy & Mining. They have one son.
