= Herndon High School =

High school in Herndon, Virginia

Location
- 700 Bennett Street; Herndon, Virginia 20170; 38°59′10.1″N 77°22′29.8″W

Information
- School type: Public, high school
- Motto: Hornet Pride
- Founded: 1911 (115 years ago); Relocated: 1967 (59 years ago)
- School district: Fairfax County Public Schools
- Principal: Elizabeth Noto
- Teaching staff: 172.05 (FTE) (2016–17)
- Grades: 9–12
- Enrollment: 2,346 (2016–17)
- Student to teacher ratio: 13.64 (2016–17)
- Campus: Suburban
- Colors: Red; Black
- Athletics conference: Liberty District; Northern Region
- Mascot: Hornets
- Rivals: South Lakes High School Westfield High School
- Feeder schools: Herndon Middle School Hughes Middle School Carson Middle School
- Website: Official website

Herndon High School is a four-year public high school in Herndon, Virginia, United States. The school serves grades 9-12 and is a part of the Fairfax County Public Schools (FCPS) system. Founded in 1911, Herndon High School has approximately 2 300 students.

== History ==
Herndon High School first opened in 1911 on Locust Street in Herndon, Virginia. In 1914, Herndon High School became the first fully-accredited high school in Fairfax County, and was the only accredited high school in the county until 1920.

In 1930, seventy-one students enrolled, with classes such as economics, agriculture, and business education offered, with classes in industrial arts later offered. In 1942, the school opened the first school cafeteria in Fairfax County. Back then, meals costed five cents. Also in 1945, the first football team was organized, and played its first game against Leesburg High School. The following year, the first high school band in Fairfax County was formed at the school.

In the early 1950s, the building was expanded to support more students; and in 1961, Herndon Intermediate School began within the Herndon High School building.

In 1967, the High School moved to its current Bennett Street location, leaving Herndon Intermediate School at Locust Street with 650 students and 39 teachers.

== Sport and extracurricular activities ==
In 2009, the school's baseball field was named Alan McCullock Field for retiring baseball coach Alan McCullock, whose father has the same honor at Falls Church High School.

=== State champions ===
- Basketball (boys): 1951
- Cross Country (girls): 2003
- Football: 1965 (1B)
- Gymnastics (boys): 1977, 1990, 1991, 2000
- Soccer (boys): 1986, 2025
- Track & Field (boys): 1965, 1966, 1967
- Co-Ed Cheerleading: 2012

=== Marching Band ===
The program has been a part of Northern Virginia since 1947, making it the oldest established high school band in Fairfax County. The program began when dedicated parents and citizens convinced Vladamir Johnson, a Russian interpreter and part-time music teacher from Washington, D.C., to rehearse a group of fledgling musicians in the rural town of Herndon.

Today, the band program at Herndon High School grown considerably, increasing from that original group of fifteen musicians to more than 100 instrumentalists comprising the following ensembles: Marching Band, Guard, Wind Ensemble, Symphonic Band, Jazz Band, and Indoor Drumline.

Herndon High School Band represented Virginia at the 2023 Pearl Harbor Memorial Parade in Honolulu, Hawaii.

==== Directors ====
- Valdemar Johnson, 1947 – 1958
- Fritz Velke, 1958 – 1964
- James Swiney, 1964 - 1968
- Larry Willis, 1968 – 1971
- George Duman, 1971 – 1978
- Richard Bergman, 1978 - 2008
- Kathleen Jacoby, 2008-2024
- Brian Fisher. 2024 - Present

== Notable alumni ==
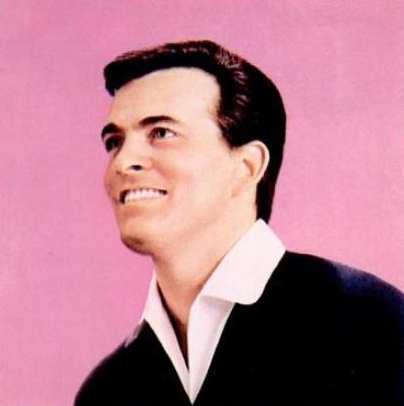
Ronnie Dove

=== Arts and media ===
Duncan G. Stroik

- Tanya Biank (1989), journalist, author, Army Wives
- Ronnie Dove (1954), former pop music singer
- Angie Goff (1997), television news anchor, WTTG, formerly on Today
- Don Handfield (1989), filmmaker, producer, and author
- Pat Cassidy, film producer and music manager
- Mark Riddick (1994), illustrator and musician

=== Sports ===
- Bill Butler (1965), former professional baseball player, Kansas City Royals, Cleveland Indians, and Minnesota Twins
- Jon Carman (1994), former professional football player, Buffalo Bills
- Brandon Guyer (2004), college baseball player, University of Virginia
- Austin Miller (born 1993), pole vaulter
- Scottie Reynolds (2006), former point guard for the Villanova University Wildcats, McDonald's All-American, and 2006-07 Big East Rookie of the Year

=== Other ===
- Duncan G. Stroik (1980), architect and academic
- Dave Lavery (1977), NASA program executive and member, FIRST Robotics executive advisory board
