= Concorde District =

High school district in Virginia, US

The Concorde District is a high school district in the state of Virginia that includes public schools from Fairfax County. It is widely regarded as one of the most competitive districts in the Virginia High School League (VHSL).

== History ==
The Concorde District was founded in 1993 as part the realignment of the Northern Region. The charter members of the district, which began playing in the 1994–1995 school year, were Centreville, Chantilly, Herndon, Thomas Jefferson, Oakton, South Lakes, and W.T. Woodson, all of Fairfax County. All seven schools were among the largest schools in the Northern Region at the time, playing Division 6 football.

=== 1997–1999 ===
In 1997, Potomac Falls High School of Loudoun County opened and joined the Concorde District due to its proximity to its member schools. It was not competitive because its size which was well below the AA/AAA cutoff, and also because it was new. Potomac Falls moved to the Northwestern District in 1999, and W.T. Woodson moved to the Liberty District This reunited it with crosstown rival Fairfax which dropped the Concorde to six schools.

=== 2000–present ===
In 2000, Westfield opened and joined the Concorde, making it the second newly established school to join the district. South Lakes left the Concorde in 2003 to the Liberty due to declining enrollment, and Thomas Jefferson was allowed to play in the National District for football while remaining in the Concorde for other sports.

In 2005, Thomas Jefferson moved to the Liberty, while Fairfax moved to the Concorde, and Robinson moved from the Patriot to the Concorde District. In 2009, Fairfax returned to the Liberty. In 2017 as part of a realignment by the VHSL, Robinson and founding member Herndon left the Concorde District as Robinson returned the Patriot District and Herndon moved to the Liberty District. James Madison, a long-standing member of the Liberty District, was added to the district.

In 2021 South Lakes left the Liberty District to re-join the Concorde District.

== Current members ==
As of 2026, the six schools in the district are:

School	Location	Mascot	Colors
Centreville High School	Clifton	Wildcats	Carolina blue, Black and Silver
Chantilly High School	Chantilly	Chargers	Purple and White
James Madison High School (Fairfax County, Virginia)	Vienna	Warhawks	Red and Black
Oakton High School	Oakton	Cougars	Maroon and Gold
South Lakes High School	Reston	Seahawks	Royal Blue and Green
Westfield High School (Virginia)	Chantilly	Bulldogs	Black and Gold

== Former members ==
School	Location	Mascot	Colors	Years active
Fairfax High School	Fairfax	Lions	Blue and Gray	2005–2009
Herndon High School	Herndon	Hornets	Red and Black	1993–2017
Potomac Falls High School	Sterling	Panthers	Maroon and Black	1997–1999
Robinson Secondary School	Fairfax	Rams	Royal Blue and Gold	2005–2017
Thomas Jefferson High School for Science and Technology	Alexandria	Colonials	Navy and Red	1993–2005
W.T. Woodson High School	Fairfax	Cavaliers	Navy and Red	1993–1999

== Current Athletic Concorde District Champions ==
Fall 2025 Sports Champions

- Cheerleading:
- Boys Cross Country: Oakton
- Girls Cross County:
- Field Hockey:
- Football: Centreville
- Golf:
- Volleyball:

Winter 2025-26 Sports Champions

- Boys Basketball: Westfield
- Girls Basketball: Oakton
- Girls Gymnastics:
- Boys Swimming:
- Girls Swimming:
- Boys Indoor Track: South Lakes
- Girls Indoor Track: South Lakes
- Wrestling:

Spring 2026 Sports Champions

- Baseball:
- Boys Lacrosse:
- Girls Lacrosse:
- Boys Soccer:
- Girls Soccer:
- Softball:
- Boys Tennis:
- Girls Tennis:
- Boys Track:
- Girls Track:

== Northern Region championships won by Concorde District schools ==
- Boys Basketball: Centreville (2020, 2021), Westfield (2015, 2016), Chantilly (1992?), South Lakes (2022, 2023, 2024, 2025)
- Football: Madison (2020, 2021, 2022, 2023), Westfield (2003, 2007, 2015, 2016, 2017, 2018, 2019), Centreville (1998, 1999, 2000, 2011, 2013, 2014), Oakton (2002, 2005, 2008, 2012), Chantilly (1996, 2006)
- Softball: Centreville (2000)
- Girls Soccer: Centreville (2006, 2007)
- Field Hockey: Madison (2020), Centreville (2000, 2001)
- Golf: Centreville (1995, 1996, 2001, 2002)
- Boys Indoor Track and Field: Centreville (2002)
- Baseball: Madison (2020, 2021, 2025), Westfield (2004, 2019, 2023), Chantilly (2016), Oakton (2007)
- Girls Basketball: Madison (2020, 2021, 2022, 2023), Oakton (2012), Centreville (2024)
- Boys Basketball: Westfield (2015, 2016)
- Volleyball: Chantilly (2022)
- Cheerleading: Chantilly (2022, 2023)

School	Baseball	B. Basketball	G. Basketball	X Country	Field Hockey	Football	Golf	Gymnastics	B. LAX	G. LAX	B. Soccer	G. Soccer	Softball	Swim & Dive	B. Tennis	G. Tennis	Track & Field (indoor)	Track & Field (outdoor)	Wrestling	Volleyball	Cheerleading	Total
Centreville		2020, 2021	2024			1994,1998, 1999, 2000, 2011, 2013, 2014	1995, 1996, 2001, 2002					2006, 2007	2000				2002					18
Chantilly	2016					1996, 2006															2022, 2023	
Madison	2020, 2021, 2025		2020, 2021, 2022, 2023		2020	2020, 2021, 2022, 2023																
Oakton	2007		2012			2012																
South Lakes		2022, 2023, 2024, 2025																				
Westfield	2019, 2023	2015, 2016				2003, 2007, 2015, 2016, 2017, 2018, 2019																
Totals																						

== State championships won by Concorde District schools ==
- Boys Basketball: Centreville (2020, 2021)
- Boys Basketball: South Lakes (2024, 2025)
- Baseball: Madison (2021, 2023)
- Girls Basketball: Madison (2020, 2021, 2022, 2023)
- Field Hockey: Madison (2020)
- Football: Centreville (2000, 2013)
- Football: Westfield (2003, 2007, 2015, 2016, 2017)
- Football: Chantilly (1996)
- Boys Basketball: Westfield (2016, 2026)
- Baseball: Oakton (2000)
- Baseball: Chantilly (2016)
- Girls Lacrosse: Westfield (2014)
- Field Hockey: Westfield (2013, 2017)
- Boys Cross Country: Oakton (1998, 2005, 2008)
- Boys Lacrosse: Oakton (2003, 2004, 2005)
- Football: Oakton (2005)
- Girls Lacrosse: Oakton (2006, 2007, 2008, 2012)
- Boys Swim and Dive: Oakton (2010)
- Girls Basketball: Oakton (2012)
- Girls Swim and Dive: Oakton (2012)
- Girls Cross Country: Oakton (2013)
- Golf: Chantilly (2013, 2015)
- Softball: Centreville (1995)
- Volleyball: Chantilly (2018)
- Girls Cross Country: Centreville (1995, 1996)
- Girls Indoor Track and Field: Centreville (1994, 1995)
- Girls Lacrosse: Centreville (2000, 2001)
- Girls Outdoor Track and Field: Centreville (1993, 1996)

School	Baseball	B. Basketball	G. Basketball	X Country	Field Hockey	Football	Golf	Gymnastics	B. LAX	G. LAX	B. Soccer	G. Soccer	Softball	Swim & Dive	B. Tennis	G. Tennis	Volleyball	Track & Field (indoor)	Track & Field (outdoor)	Wrestling	Total
Centreville		2020, 2021				2000, 2013				2000, 2001			1995								
Chantilly	2016					1996	2013, 2015														
Madison	2021, 2023		2020, 2021, 2022																		
Oakton	2000		2012			2005			2003, 2004, 2005	2006, 2007, 2008, 2012											
South Lakes		2024, 2025																			
Westfield		2016, 2026			2013, 2017	2003, 2007, 2015, 2016, 2017				2014											
Totals																					
