= Falls Church High School =

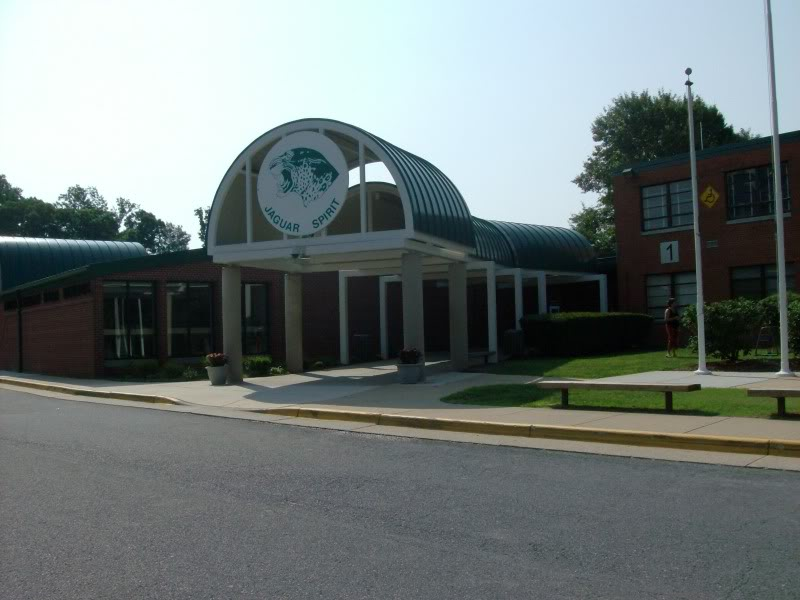

Location
- 7521 Jaguar Trail; Falls Church, Virginia 22042; United States; 38°51′44″N 77°12′24″W

Information
- School type: Public, high school
- Founded: 1945, 1967 (relocated)
- School district: Fairfax County Public Schools
- Principal: Benjamin Nowak
- Staff: 249
- Grades: 9–12
- Enrollment: 2,150 (2018-19)
- Campus: Suburban
- Colors: Green, White and Gold (alternate)
- Athletics conference: National District; Northern Region
- Mascot: Jaguar
- Rivals: Justice High School
- Feeder schools: Jackson Middle School, Poe Middle School
- Website: fallschurchhs.fcps.edu

Falls Church High School (FCHS) is a high school located in West Falls Church, Virginia, in unincorporated Fairfax County. While the school has a Falls Church mailing address, the school does not serve the City of Falls Church, which is served by Meridian High School. The school serves grades 9 through 12. It was relocated from its former site in downtown Falls Church to the current address in 1967. Falls Church High's school motto is "Building on Our Success." The mascot for the school is a Jaguar. The school colors are dark green and white. The principal is Benjamin Nowak.

== Demographics ==
There were 2,103 students enrolled in Falls Church High School 2022–2023 school year. Of those, 1,290 (61.34%) were Hispanic, 306 (14.55%) were Asian, 317 (15.07%) were white (non-Hispanic); 116 (5.52%) were black (non-Hispanic); and 74 (3.52%) were from another ethnic group or more than one. In terms of gender, from the 2018–2019 school year, 935 students identified as females (46.08%) and 1,094 identified as male (53.92%). Most of Falls Church High School's students (90%) are enrolled in general education. Some students are enrolled in special education, and some receive English Learner services. The graduation rate is 85%.

== Location ==
Prior to 1967, the school was located at Hillwood Avenue and Cherry Street in Falls Church, Virginia. Construction began in 1944 during WWII and was completed in 1945. It then moved to its current location at 7521 Jaguar Trail, Falls Church, Virginia postal address, 22042. It is located off Arlington Boulevard, near Kingsley Commons - formerly Jefferson Village Apartments, and Graham Road Shopping Center (the extreme parcel of the historic Falls Church Airpark).

== Test scores ==
Falls Church High School is fully accredited based on its Virginia Standards of Learning test performance. The school was listed as the 603rd best high school in America by U.S. News & World Report in 2013. A decade later, for the 2023-2024 national ranking conducted by U.S. News, the school ranked 5,441 and 117 across all Virginia high schools.

== Recent history ==
On December 5, 2006, Falls Church High School was named a National Demonstration Site for the elective class Advancement Via Individual Determination (AVID). Falls Church is one of fifteen schools in Fairfax County that have a full four-year AVID program.

With the start of the 2010–2011 school year, Falls Church gained some of Annandale High School's population as the result of the Annandale Border Control Force (ABCF) and their actions.

== Extracurricular activities ==
=== Football ===
During the 2009 football season, The Jaguars maintained a 5–5 record, led by varsity quarterback Ajay Kashyap, during the regular season. The high note of the season was during week seven, when the Jaguars upset the AAA National District powerhouse Thomas A. Edison High School Eagles 16-14. This was the Jaguars' first win over the Eagles since 1998 and the Eagles' first AAA National District loss since 2005. The Jaguars also won their homecoming against the Mount Vernon High School Majors 42-32 and also the Bell Game against rival J. E. B. Stuart High School 42-20. During the season, senior running back Marcus Hughes rushed for a region high 1,741 yards on 245 carries, averaging 7.2 yards per carry and 19 touchdowns.

=== Baseball ===
In 1984, the school's baseball field was named Al McCullock Field for baseball coach Al McCullock, whose son has the same honor at Herndon High School.

== Notable alumni ==
- Sandy Alderson — former general manager of the New York Mets, former CEO of the San Diego Padres, former Major League Baseball executive vice president for baseball operations, former GM of the Oakland Athletics
- Bill Bell — former football placekicker for the Atlanta Falcons and New England Patriots
- Tom Bradley - former MLB player, California Angels, Chicago White Sox, San Francisco Giants; former baseball head coach, Jacksonville University, University of Maryland
- Bob Buckhorn — former mayor of Tampa, Florida, graduated in 1976
- Steve Clark — former defensive back for the Buffalo Bills
- Omar Fateh — Minnesota State Senator
- Robert D. Hull — former member of the Virginia House of Delegates from the 38th district
- Wes Johnson — voice of the Washington Capitals, video game voice actor ("The Elder Scrolls V: Skyrim", "Fallout 3", "Oblivion", "Star Trek: Legacy") movie actor ("A Dirty Shame", "The Invasion", "Hearts in Atlantis")
- Michael Norell — actor/screenwriter, known for playing Captain Hank Stanley in the television series Emergency!
- OJ Porteria — soccer player for Filipino national team
- Saddam Salim — Virginia State Senator
- Rich Sauveur — former MLB player, Pittsburgh Pirates, Montreal Expos, New York Mets, Kansas City Royals, Chicago White Sox, Oakland Athletics
- Tatianna — contestant on RuPaul’s Drag Race season 2 and RuPaul's Drag Race All Stars season 2
- Paul Woodside — former placekicker for West Virginia University
