= Vienna, Virginia =

Vienna
- Town
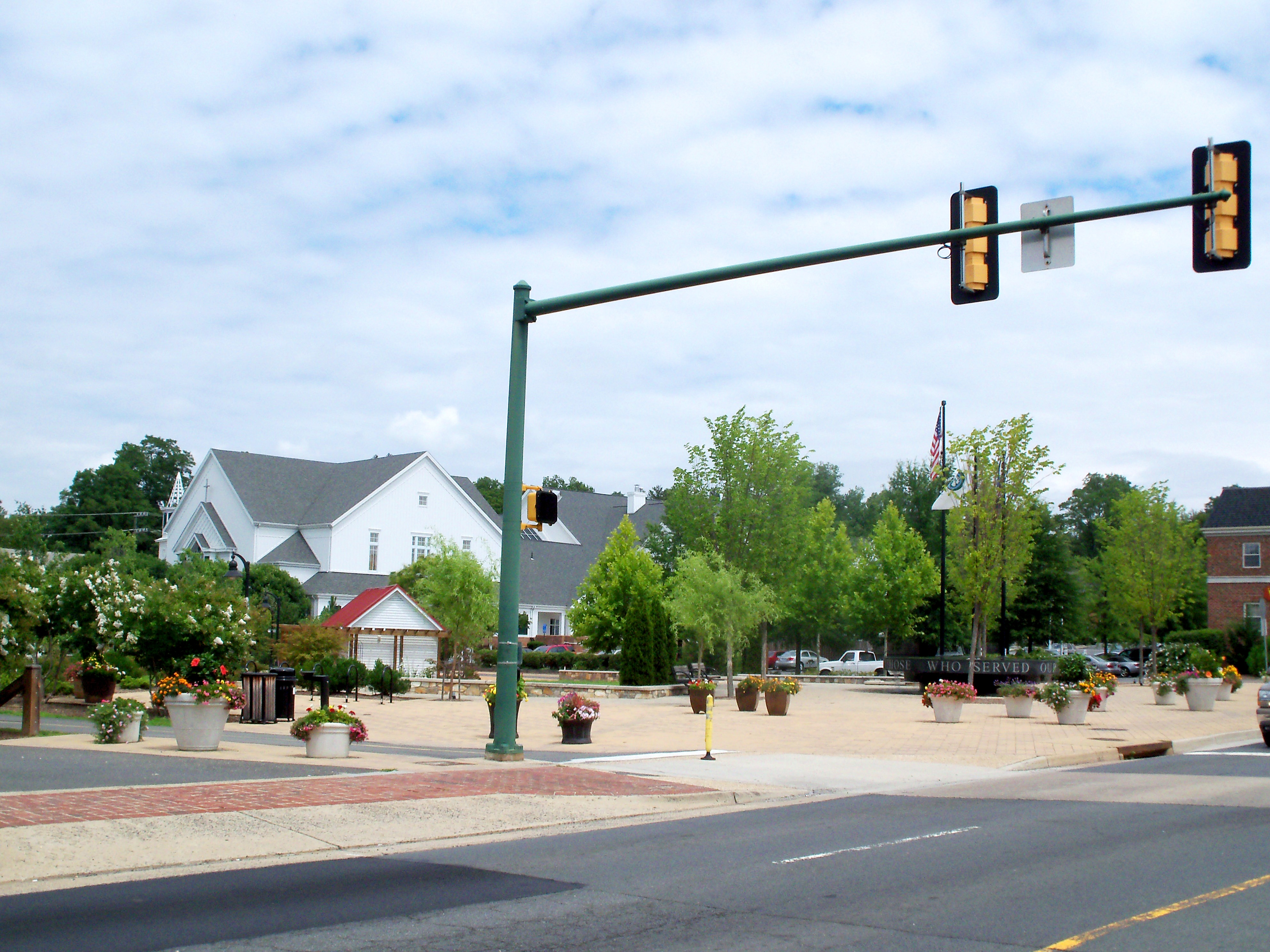
- Street scene in Vienna

- Seal

- Location of Vienna in Fairfax County, Virginia

- Location within Northern Virginia Location within Virginia Location within the United States
- Coordinates: 38°54′N 77°16′W
- Country: United States
- State: Virginia
- County: Fairfax
- Incorporated: 1890
- Settled: 1754

Government
  - Type: Council–manager
  - Mayor: Linda J. Colbert (Nonpartisan)
  - Town manager: Mercury Payton

Area
  - Total: 4.41 sq mi (11.42 km^{2})
  - Land: 4.40 sq mi (11.40 km^{2})
  - Water: 0.0077 sq mi (0.02 km^{2})
- Elevation: 358 ft (109 m)

Population (2020)
  - Total: 16,562
  - Density: 3,759.9/sq mi (1,451.69/km^{2})
- Time zone: UTC−5 (Eastern (EST))
  - Summer (DST): UTC−4 (EDT)
- ZIP Codes: 22180-22183, 22185
- Area codes: 571 and 703
- FIPS code: 51-81072
- GNIS feature ID: 1500258
- Website: www.viennava.gov/Home

Vienna (/viˈɛnə/) is a town in Fairfax County, Virginia, United States, and a suburb of Washington, D.C. As of the 2020 U.S. census, Vienna had a population of 16,562. It was first settled by Europeans in the mid-18th century. In 1861, the Battle of Vienna, one of the earliest American Civil War battles, was fought in Vienna. The Vienna Town Council, which governs the town, is composed of a mayor and six councilmembers. The town's education is served mainly by Fairfax County Public Schools.

== History ==
European settlement in the region dates to the mid-18th century. In 1754, soldier and landowner Colonel Charles Broadwater settled within the town boundaries. Broadwater's son-in-law, John Hunter, built the first recorded house there in 1767, naming it Ayr Hill to recall his birthplace, Ayr, Scotland. That name was then applied to the community. The town's name was changed in the 1850s, when a doctor, William Hendrick, settled there and the town renamed itself after his hometown, Phelps, New York, which at the time was known as Vienna.

On June 17, 1861, the Battle of Vienna, one of the earliest armed clashes of the American Civil War, was fought in Vienna. A Union army unit under Brigadier General Robert C. Schenck approached Vienna from the east by train but was ambushed and forced to retreat by a Confederate force led by Colonel Maxcy Gregg. Several historical markers in Vienna detail its Civil War history. In addition, in the town center lies the well preserved Freeman House; which, in 1861, was the polling place for the secession vote and was used during the war by both sides as a hospital. The house has been turned into a museum and gift shop.

The First Baptist Church of Vienna was founded in 1867, and the original church structure was built using Union Army barracks lumber obtained through the Freedmen's Bureau. This church building was also the town's first black public school. The first white public school was built in 1872.

A permanent black elementary school was built, and was later named for its long-time principal, Louise Archer. In fall 1965, Fairfax County Public Schools were completely desegregated.

== Geography ==
Vienna lies in the Piedmont approximately 5.5 miles (8.9 km) southwest of the Potomac River. Wolftrap Creek, a tributary of nearby Difficult Run, flows north from its source in the eastern part of town. The Bear Branch of Accotink Creek, a Potomac tributary, flows south from its source in the southern part of town. Located in Northern Virginia on Interstate 66, Vienna is 12 miles (19 km) west of Washington, D.C., and 2 miles (3.2 km) northeast of Fairfax, the county seat.

According to the U.S. Census Bureau, the town has a total area of 4.4 square miles (11 km^{2}), all of it land. As a suburb of Washington, D.C., Vienna is a part of both the Washington metropolitan area and the larger Washington–Baltimore combined statistical area. It is bordered on all sides by other Washington suburbs, including Wolf Trap to the north, Tysons Corner to the northeast, Dunn Loring to the east, Merrifield to the south, and Oakton to the west. These communities are unincorporated, and portions of them lie in ZIP codes with Vienna postal addresses despite lying outside the town's borders.

== Climate ==
Vienna has a humid subtropical climate (Cfa), where the winters are cool, and summers are hot. The town is situated in USDA Hardiness Zone 7, where the annual average minimum is 0-9 °F.

Climate data for Vienna, Virginia(1991-2020 normals)
Month	Jan	Feb	Mar	Apr	May	Jun	Jul	Aug	Sep	Oct	Nov	Dec	Year
Mean daily maximum °F (°C)	42.3 (5.7)	45.3 (7.4)	53.3 (11.8)	64.8 (18.2)	71.6 (22.0)	79.5 (26.4)	83.8 (28.8)	82.4 (28.0)	75.9 (24.4)	65.4 (18.6)	55.8 (13.2)	46.2 (7.9)	63.9 (17.7)
Daily mean °F (°C)	32.9 (0.5)	34.8 (1.6)	42.4 (5.8)	53.0 (11.7)	61.9 (16.6)	70.2 (21.2)	75.2 (24.0)	73.6 (23.1)	66.5 (19.2)	55.3 (12.9)	45.2 (7.3)	37.2 (2.9)	54.0 (12.2)
Mean daily minimum °F (°C)	23.4 (−4.8)	24.3 (−4.3)	31.6 (−0.2)	41.2 (5.1)	52.1 (11.2)	61.0 (16.1)	66.6 (19.2)	64.9 (18.3)	57.1 (13.9)	45.2 (7.3)	34.6 (1.4)	28.3 (−2.1)	44.2 (6.8)
Average precipitation inches (mm)	3.28 (83)	2.62 (67)	3.84 (98)	3.39 (86)	4.28 (109)	4.13 (105)	4.26 (108)	3.54 (90)	4.16 (106)	3.51 (89)	3.13 (80)	3.43 (87)	43.57 (1,108)
Average snowfall inches (cm)	6.5 (17)	7.5 (19)	2.0 (5.1)	0.0 (0.0)	0.0 (0.0)	0.0 (0.0)	0.0 (0.0)	0.0 (0.0)	0.0 (0.0)	0.0 (0.0)	0.1 (0.25)	2.4 (6.1)	18.5 (47.45)
Average extreme snow depth inches (cm)	5 (13)	5 (13)	3 (7.6)	0 (0)	0 (0)	0 (0)	0 (0)	0 (0)	0 (0)	0 (0)	0 (0)	2 (5.1)	5 (13)
Average precipitation days (≥ 0.01 in)	11.8	9.3	10.5	10.8	12.9	11.3	10.3	9.7	9.2	8.9	8.5	10.6	123.8
Average snowy days (≥ 0.01 in)	2.9	2.7	1	0	0	0	0	0	0	0	0.2	1.4	8.2
Source 1:
Source 2: https://www.weather.gov/wrh/Climate?wfo=lwx

== Demographics ==
Historical population
Census	Pop.	Note	%±
1880	136		—
1900	317		—
1910	578		82.3%
1920	773		33.7%
1930	903		16.8%
1940	1,237		37.0%
1950	2,029		64.0%
1960	11,440		463.8%
1970	17,146		49.9%
1980	15,469		−9.8%
1990	14,852		−4.0%
2000	14,453		−2.7%
2010	15,687		8.5%
2020	16,473		5.0%
2025 (est.)	16,691	▲	1.3%
* U.S. Decennial Census

=== Racial and ethnic composition ===
Vienna town, Virginia – Racial and ethnic composition Note: the US Census treats Hispanic/Latino as an ethnic category. This table excludes Latinos from the racial categories and assigns them to a separate category. Hispanics/Latinos may be of any race.
Race / Ethnicity (NH = Non-Hispanic)	Pop 2000	Pop 2010	Pop 2020	% 2000	% 2010	% 2020
White alone (NH)	11,124	10,942	10,451	76.97%	69.75%	63.44%
Black or African American alone (NH)	486	464	401	3.36%	2.96%	2.43%
Native American or Alaska Native alone (NH)	13	18	18	0.09%	0.11%	0.11%
Asian alone (NH)	1,365	1,886	2,672	9.44%	12.02%	16.22%
Native Hawaiian or Pacific Islander alone (NH)	0	7	13	0.00%	0.04%	0.08%
Other race alone (NH)	34	48	108	0.24%	0.31%	0.66%
Mixed race or Multiracial (NH)	363	435	914	2.51%	2.77%	5.55%
Hispanic or Latino (any race)	1,068	1,887	1,896	7.39%	12.03%	11.51%
Total	14,453	15,687	16,562	100.00%	100.00%	100.00%

=== 2020 census ===
As of the 2020 census, Vienna had a population of 16,562 and a population density of 3,741.3 inhabitants per square mile (1,444.5/km^{2}). The median age was 41.4 years. 26.7% of residents were under the age of 18 and 15.3% of residents were 65 years of age or older. For every 100 females there were 98.3 males, and for every 100 females age 18 and over there were 96.0 males age 18 and over.

100.0% of residents lived in urban areas, while 0.0% lived in rural areas.

There were 5,491 households and 4,215 families in Vienna. Of all households, 44.7% had children under the age of 18 living in them, 67.3% were married-couple households, 11.3% were households with a male householder and no spouse or partner present, and 18.2% were households with a female householder and no spouse or partner present. About 15.3% of all households were made up of individuals, and 8.5% had someone living alone who was 65 years of age or older. The average household size was 2.84, and the average family size was 3.19.

There were 5,706 housing units, of which 3.8% were vacant. The homeowner vacancy rate was 1.1% and the rental vacancy rate was 4.1%.

=== Income and poverty ===
As of 2009, the median income for a household in the town was $113,817, and the median income for a family was $124,895. Males had a median income of $88,355 versus $66,642 for females. The per capita income for the town was $49,544. About 3.7% of families and 5.9% of the population were below the poverty line, including 6.5% of those under age 18 and 2.9% of those age 65 or over.

=== Housing ===
Vienna's median home price was $820,000 in 2017, one of the highest in the nation.

== Government ==
The Vienna Town Council is composed of a mayor and six council members. The Council establishes policies, passes ordinances and resolutions, approves the Town budget, sets tax rates, approves land-use plans, and makes appointments to Town boards and commissions. Elections of the Council members and mayor is over seen and run by the Fairfax County Office of Elections

As of January 1, 2026, the mayor of Vienna, VA is Linda Jane Colbert. Members of the town council are Chuck Anderson, Roy James Baldwin, Doug Francis, Dann Nash, Jessica Ramakis, and Howard J. Springsteen. The council is nonpartisan and members are elected for a 2-year term ending December 31.

== Education ==
The town is served by Fairfax County Public Schools. Vienna is served by three high schools (Oakton, Madison, and Marshall); two middle schools (Kilmer and Thoreau), and seven elementary schools. However, of all the schools Vienna students attend, only four public and one private are actually within the town limits: Cunningham Park Elementary School, Marshall Road Elementary School, Louise Archer Elementary School, Vienna Elementary School and Green Hedges School.

Vienna has one independent school, Green Hedges, accredited by the Virginia Association of Independent Schools. Green Hedges has students from ages 3– 5 (Montessori preschool and kindergarten program) through preparatory grades 1–8. Founded in 1942 by Frances and Kenton Kilmer, the School was relocated to the Windsor Heights area of Vienna in 1955.

Vienna also has one independent Catholic school, Oakcrest School, which was founded in 1976 and moved to its permanent campus in Vienna in 2017, and two Catholic elementary schools: St. Mark Catholic School and Our Lady of Good Counsel Catholic School.

Fairfax County Public Library operates the Patrick Henry Library in Vienna.

== Transportation ==
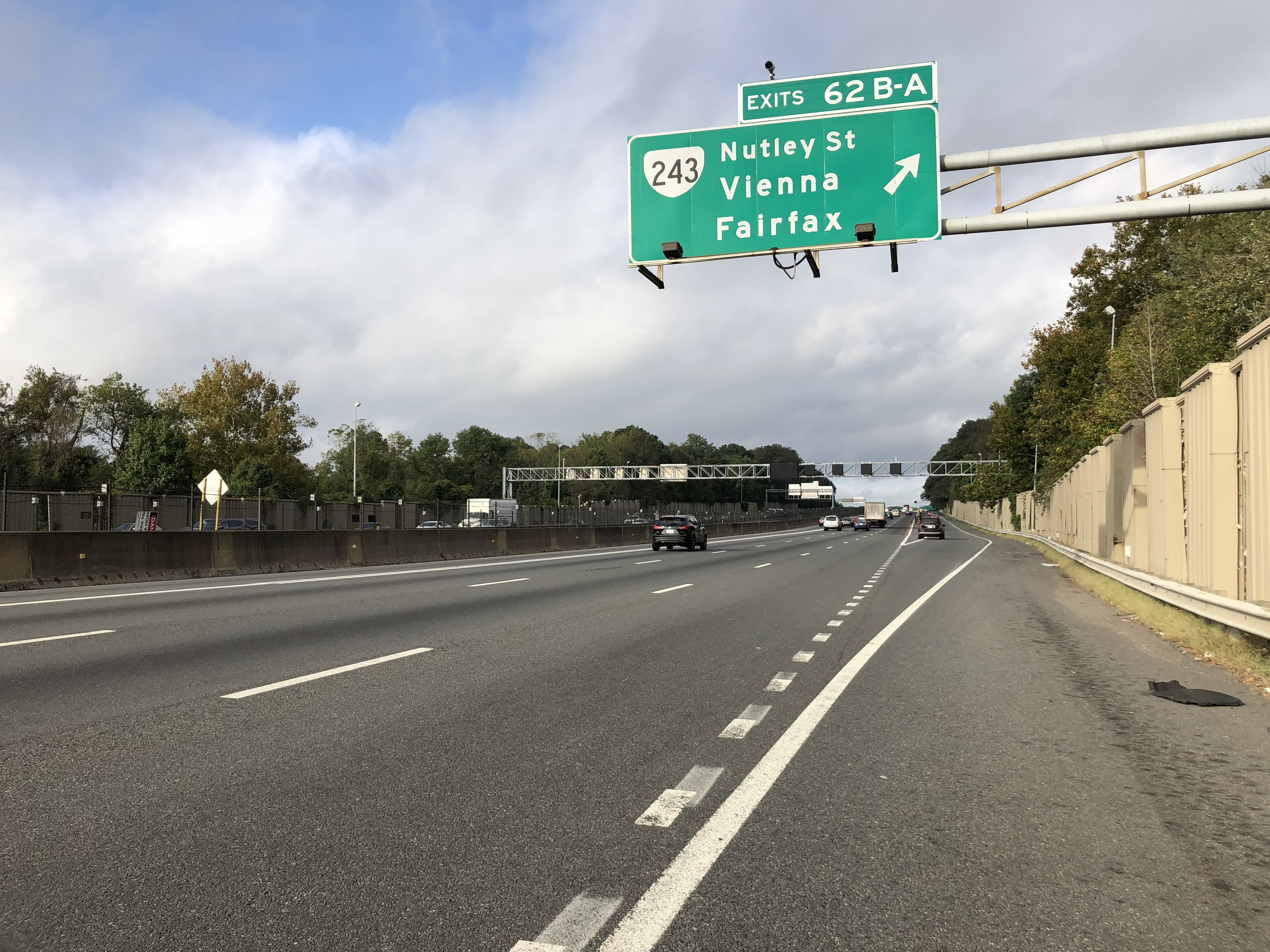
I-66 westbound in Vienna

Interstate 66 is the main highway serving Vienna. Access is provided via Exit 62 and Virginia State Route 243. In addition, Virginia State Route 123 runs through downtown Vienna. The town is served on the Washington Metro network by Vienna station on the Orange Line.

== Economy ==
MAE-East is located in Vienna. Along with MAE-West, it served as one of two locations, where all Internet traffic was exchanged between one ISP and other private, government, and academic Internet networks and served as a magnet for telecom and other high-tech companies focused on the Internet. In 1995 America Online (AOL) was headquartered at 8619 Westwood Center Drive in Tysons Corner CDP in unincorporated Fairfax County, near Vienna.

The corporate headquarters of Navy Federal Credit Union is located in Vienna.

=== Top employers ===
According to Vienna's 2025 Annual Comprehensive Financial Report, the top employers in the town are:

#	Employer	# of Employees
1	Navy Federal Credit Union	1,000+
2	Fairfax County Public Schools	500–999
3	Giant Food	100–249
4	Town of Vienna	100–249
5	Whole Foods Market Group	100–249
6	Westwood Country Club	100–249
7	Wheat's Lawn and Custom Land, Inc	100–249
8	Hope Advanced Veterinary Clinic	100–249
9	Chick-fil-A Vienna on Maple	50–99
10	U.S. Postal Service	50–99

== Recreation ==
The W&OD Trail crosses through downtown Vienna. Several parks are located near the town, including Meadowlark Botanical Gardens and Wolf Trap National Park for the Performing Arts. The town green and Jammin' Java coffeehouse and music club serve as areas for theatre and musical performances. The Vienna Inn is one of the oldest restaurants in the area, serving residents with hot dogs and beer since 1960.

== Notable people ==
Many of these residents live outside the town but in the Vienna postal delivery area.

- Lillian Elvira Moore Abbot, painter
- Yussur A. F. Abrar, former governor, Central Bank of Somalia
- Angela Aki, singer
- Alex Albrecht, host of Digg podcast Diggnation
- Louise Archer, notable Black Educator
- Mike Baker, former CIA operations officer and Fox News contributor
- David Baldacci, author
- Sandra Beasley, poet
- Velta Benn, pilot
- Reva Beck Bosone, former U.S. Representative
- Gordon L. Brady, economist and writer
- Steve Buckhantz, Washington Wizards play-by-play announcer
- Ian Caldwell, author
- David Chang, chef and restaurateur
- Tom Davis, former U.S. Representative
- John M. Dowd, lawyer
- Trevor N. Dupuy, historian and former U.S. Army colonel
- Bryce Eldridge, First baseman for the San Francisco Giants.
- Bill Emerson (musician), bluegrass banjoist and founder of The Country Gentlemen
- Billy Lee Evans, former U.S. Representative
- Kyle Foggo, former U.S. federal government intelligence officer convicted of bribery
- Katherine Hadford, figure skater
- Jim Hill, former distance runner who competed in the World Athletics Championships
- Robert Hanssen, former FBI counterespionage agent convicting of conducting espionage for the Soviet Union
- Charles DeLano Hine, former civil engineer, lawyer, railway official, and U.S. Army colonel during Spanish–American War
- Orrin E. Hine, Union Army major in 50th New York Engineer Regiment during American Civil War
- Spencer Heath, inventor of the reversible pitch airplane propeller
- William G. Hundley, former criminal defense attorney
- Mark Keam, former Virginia House of Delegates member
- David Kellermann, former chief financial officer, Freddie Mac
- Lester Kinsolving, reporter, columnist, and talk show host
- Ilia Malinin, U.S. Olympic figure skater
- Michael McCrary, former professional football player, Baltimore Ravens and Seattle Seahawks
- Robert M. McDowell, former Federal Communications Commission commissioner
- Heather Mercer, Christian missionary held captive in Afghanistan in 2001
- John Myung, professional poker player
- Héctor Andrés Negroni, first Puerto Rican graduate of U.S. Air Force Academy
- Alketas Panagoulias, former Greece and the United States soccer team manager
- Howard Phillips, former conservative political activist
- Tony Rodham, American consultant and businessman and youngest brother of Hillary Clinton
- Garrett Roe, former U.S. hockey Olympian
- Chris Samuels, former professional football player, Washington Redskins
- Randy Scott, ESPN sportscater and former stand-up comedian
- Holly Seibold, non-profit leader and Virginia House of Delegates nominee
- Kaleem Shah, entrepreneur and owner of thoroughbred race horses
- Alfred Dennis Sieminski, former U.S. Representative
- Nick Sorensen, former professional football player, Cleveland Browns
- Michael J. Sullivan, fantasy novelist
- Edwin Winans, U.S. Army general
- Frank Wolf, former U.S. Representative

== Points of interest ==
- Freeman Store and Museum (Vienna, Virginia)
- Jammin' Java coffeehouse and music club
- Meadowlark Botanical Gardens
- Terrorist Screening Center
- Wolf Trap National Park for the Performing Arts (located in the CDP of Wolf Trap, Virginia)
