= Rocky Gerung =

Indonesian philosopher and academic (born 1959)

- Portrait, 2026
- Born: 20 January 1959 (age 67); Manado, North Sulawesi, Indonesia
- Education: University of Indonesia
- Occupation: Academic
- Known for: Contemporary philosopher and Citizen activist

Rocky Gerung (born 20 January 1959) is an Indonesian political commenter and philosopher, who is currently serving as a member of the Presidential Advisory Council.

He is known for his sharp and often provocative criticism of the Indonesian governments, particularly during Joko Widodo's presidency. He is one of the founders of the Setara Institute and a fellow at the Perhimpunan Pendidikan Demokrasi (P2D). He's also taught for 15 years in University of Indonesia.

== Early life ==
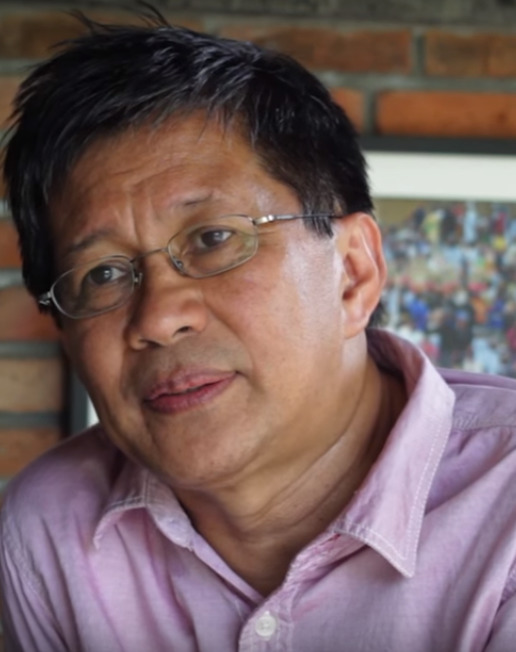
Rocky Gerung in 2015

Rocky began studying at the University of Indonesia in 1979. He first entered the department of political science, which at that time joined the Faculty of Social Sciences, before deciding to move to the department of philosophy and graduated in 1986. During college, Rocky was close to the socialist-leaning activists such as Marsillam Simanjuntak and Hariman Siregar among others.

== Career ==
After graduating, Rocky taught in the department as a non-permanent lecturer until the beginning of 2015. He stopped teaching due to the issuance of Law No. 14 of 2005 which requires a lecturer to have a minimum of a master's degree; whereas Rocky only holds a bachelor's degree. He was teaching courses such as the Seminar on Justice Theory, Political Philosophy, and Philosophy Research Methods; he also taught at the postgraduate program.

Together with figures such as Abdurrahman Wahid and Azyumardi Azra, Rocky co-founded the Setara Institute, a think tank in the field of democracy and human rights, in 2005. As a philosopher, one of Rocky's fields of study was the philosophy of feminism. He wrote a lot in Jurnal Perempuan, a publication managed by the Women's Journal Foundation and founded by Gadis Arivia, his colleague at the University of Indonesia.

== Criticism of the Indonesian government ==
Throughout Joko Widodo's presidency, Rocky maintained a stance of opposition to the government. Rocky has been labeled by Indonesia's Tempo newspaper on its podcast Bocor Alus Politik as the No.1 "State Palace enemy" due to his outspoken opposition to the government. News outlet Times of Indonesia describes Rocky as a figure "known for his critical academic perspective and expertise in logic". Doctor (of Philosophy) Otto Gusti Madung, the rector of Ledalero Institute of Philosophy and Creative Technology, regarded Rocky as an "exemplary intellectual" comparable to German philosopher Jürgen Habermas, and considered Rocky as the "conscience of the people who is able to guide society towards an understanding of ethical politics". Meanwhile, Haji Asmu'i Syarkowi, the High Judge of the Jayapura High Religious Court, described Rocky in his article as a person "well-known for his sharp criticism of the government" and use of "cutting remarks", but also considered him as one of the only two prominent figures in Indonesia whose "speeches compel the audience to pay close attention to every nuance of their words" other than President Abdurrahman Wahid. Due to his oppositional commentary, Rocky has been subjected to criticism, insults, and lawsuits by the pro-government, but also gained fame and supporters.

In 2017, Rocky appeared on Indonesian TV show Indonesia Lawyers Club (ILC), which marked his entrance to mainstream media. On his first appearance on the show, he attacked Widodo's administration as being in a state of panic and taking extreme measures to maintain its power. He claimed that the president and the government had the means and motive to control the flow of information and to spread misinformation. When discussing about hoaxes, Rocky cited Widodo's dismissal and accusation on the lack of scientific rigor about the controversial book Jokowi Undercover as an example of a government-made hoax. He argued that only academic experts could determine a book's scientific validity. He alleged that "all the public discourse is taken over by the government" and the country is progressing into a totalitarian under Widodo's regime from the lack of freedom of information and speech. In another episode of the show, Rocky accused Widodo's administration of abusing the Electronic Information and Transactions Law (UU ITE) to "handcuffs" any government critics into prison. He also argued that due to the ambiguity of the Indonesian word "kebebasan" (which can be translated in English as both freedom and liberty), he believed there has been a deliberate attempt to misuse the word to restrict people's freedom, which is an inalienable human rights, by falsely equating it to liberty, a system he propounded as more susceptible to limitations. On the show's episode discussing government's plan of moving Indonesia's capital from Jakarta to Borneo, Rocky questioned the administration's inconsistent and vague reasons for the relocation, particularly with the justification "not changing the capital but ..., to change the center of government", which he viewed the meaning to be "blur".

In the modern era, the center of government is not in the palace, but in the brain; if your brain is empty, the center of government is useless.

— Rocky Gerung

He connected the new capital city project with Widodo's earlier local-produced automotive project Esemka, and labeled the latter as a national-scale "fabrication" while the former as a "ludicrous" project. When the show ILC was cancelled from airing on TV for 2021, he criticized the government, said: “Because [the program] was considered a trouble, [now] one of the troubles has been eliminated" and "political talk shows should have been nurtured by the state". Rocky described the show ILC as "some kind of extracurricular" for the citizens that "sponsored [them] to be critical of [those in] power" and as a means to "preserve democracy". His popularity on the show has led to the coined of the catchphrase 'No Rocky No Party'.

In his views, Rocky believed that Widodo's administration is responsible for several offenses, including alleged mismanagement of the country's nickel mining industry, allowing "mafia" control over cooking oil supplies that led to shortages, destructing environment, committing erosion of democracy, and damaging harmony among the civilians. He frequently disparages Widodo's intellectual discernment in making policies. He has characterized Widodo as politically imprudent, often employing vitriolic rhetoric to convey this. During his trial on charges for offense against the Dignity of the Head of State, he made a statement to the judge: “This president has a flawed logic, incapable of thinking because [of] foolish". In his defense, Rocky asserted that he was only criticizing Widodo on his role as Head of State and his policies, not on his personal. Rocky claimed that Widodo has previously expressed concern about the country's traffic congestion but made a policy to subsidies electric motorcycles, which Rocky used as an example of what he perceived as Widodo's "erroneous logic" and political ineptitude. On another occasion, he also commented on Widodo's diplomatic and communication skills. According to Rocky, when addressing conflict of terrors from religious leaders, a president should have made a conciliatory statement, meanwhile he accused Widodo's response as having the potential to further exacerbate divisions and worsen the situation. "[A]t that time, Mr. Joko Widodo said: For those who are intolerant, [there is] no place; such is the reaction of a president that increases our anxiety," he said. Rocky accused Widodo's government of harbouring covert enemies by exploiting terrorism issues. Rocky also directed criticism on Widodo's public speaking, deeming it "embarrassing" as a citizens to witness. Rocky characterized Widodo as president who is "nervous and stammering," "stupid before the world's press," and "incapable to fully utilize the intellect bestowed upon him by God".

In one of the episodes of podcast Bocor Alus Politik by Tempo newspaper, Rocky alleged that Widodo was attempting to build a legacy on projects that were not part of his election promises, meanwhile many of his initial campaign promises remain unfulfilled. One such project that Rocky has significantly excoriated is the construction of Ibu Kota Nusantara (IKN), the new capital city of Indonesia, which he described as a "stalled" project that lacks investors and is consuming a staggering portion of the state budget (estimated at Rp446 trillion), and was not in Widodo's initial campaign promises that got him elected by the people. This is the project which the plan he previously called as ludicrous. Furthermore, Rocky decried that Widodo's policies have disproportionately impacted the middle class, leading to increased economic hardship. Rocky claimed the occurrence of phenomenons of civilians sleeping hungry, surging numbers in psychosomatic stomach ulcers, and growing reliance on ready-to-eat meals are examples of the people's economic anxiety and the unaffordability of food ingredients caused by the administration's policies. Rocky expounded that Widodo's tenures saw a decrease in the amount of resource profits returned to the country compared to the administrations of President Soeharto and President Susilo Bambang Yudhoyono. He condemned Widodo's use of state budget for IKN construction as "cruel" because he believes it deprives the common people of their right to justice and access to proper nutrition for the sake of Widodo's infrastructure "ambitions" which he contended as "useless" for public welfare. Additionally, Rocky criticized Widodo's policy of obliging workers to pay contributions to the Public Housing Savings (Tapera). He believed the scheme was not actually for public housing, but rather "a way to plug the state budget deficit" to continue to finance Widodo's national projects. Rocky questioned, "How do we know [if the funds] are also used or invested elsewhere and ..., used for the new capital city (IKN)?" He called Tapera as a "law-based extortion by the state".

Rocky was one of the earliest people who believed Widodo as inculpable of corruption, oligarchy, and favouritism. In July 2020, he implicated Widodo of nepotism when the president's eldest son Gibran Rakabuming Raka contested the 2020 Surakarta mayoral election. He argued that Gibran should have at least entered politics only after his father leaves the presidential office and earn some experiences from lesser positions himself. Moreover, Rocky characterized Widodo's actions of inviting Gibran's potential opponent in the 2020 Surakarta mayoral election, Achmad Purnomo, who was then-Vice Mayor of Surakarta, as a blatant attempt to "bribe his son's competitor" into withdrawal and he labeled it a "political prostitution". Gibran eventually only faced one opponent in the mayoral contest, an independent tailor Bagyo Wahyono, whom many has considered as a "puppet" brought forward by Widodo to construct the illusion of a rival's presence or to avoid the impression that Gibran was the only candidate and won against empty box, though Bagyo denied. Rocky viewed the election in Surakarta as "not merely arrogance but maximum ..., ultimate political depravity" of the Widodo's regime. Rocky made similar criticism again in November 2020 when Widodo's son-in-law Bobby Nasution contested the 2020 Medan mayoral election. Rocky visited Medan for two days during the campaign to advocate against voting for oligarchy and dynasty in politics. Rocky disregarded Bobby's contestation as "nepotism [in the government] center subsequently being proliferated to the regional level".

However, people will demand accountability… if in a system of civilized politics. That—[such] President, who is caught making transactions of political malfeasance; political prostitution—would have been impeached because [it means] the ethics have been violated entirely.

— Rocky Gerung

Following Gibran and Bobby's quick count victories in the mayoral elections, Rocky complimented Widodo satirically: “President [Joko Widodo] successfully fulfilled the role as a good head of the family, capable of managing his family... to the extent that power is able to be passed down".

In 2022, Rocky reproached Widodo for failing to uphold neutrality during the campaign for 2024 Indonesian presidential election and alleged Widodo of orchestrating unlawful efforts to secure the win of presidential candidate and Widodo's Minister of Defense, Prabowo Subianto, to remain in power after his own tenure ends. Rocky denounced it as "a new culture in our country, a culture of democratic monarchy".

In 2023, Rocky criticized the ruling by Indonesian Constitutional Court to allow presidential and vice-presidential candidates to be under 40 years old if they have previously held elected office. This ruling enabled Gibran, the son of President Widodo, to enter the race as Prabowo's running mate after being previously ineligible due to his young age. Rocky described the ruling as indicative of nepotism and that it was suspiciously manipulated to clear the path for Gibran's candidacy. He depicted the Constitutional Court as "repeatedly serving merely as a tool of [those in] power or an instrument of the president". He labeled its decision as the "epitome of decay of our legal system". Rocky also pointed that the ruling was made by Anwar Usman, the Chief Justice of the Constitutional Court of Indonesia, who is the brother-in-law of Widodo and paternal uncle of Gibran. Rocky referred to this level of involvement as "super dynasty".

Rocky further condemned Widodo's maneuver to distribute social assistance using the presidential budget during Prabowo and Gibran's campaign. Rocky alleged it as an abuse of taxpayers' money to "scam" the people into thinking they were being helped thus influence public opinion in favor of Widodo's son Gibran. Rocky stated, “President Jokowi exploited the poverty and lack of education among the people to achieve his ambitions. This is cruel and unethical… Using social assistance to support Gibran [in campaigning] illustrate the chaos and derangement of this regime".

I appreciate Mr. Jokowi's ability to accumulate power; but he failed to distribute justice.

— Rocky Gerung

== Notable works ==
- Fan, Rocky Gerung, and Budi Murdono (1991). "Teori Sosial dan Praktek Politik". Jakarta: Penerbit Graffiti.
- Saraswati, L. G. and Rocky Gerung (2006). "Hak Asasi Manusia:(2007). "Plurale dan Konsekwensinya: Catatan Kaki untuk Filsafat Politik’ Nurcholish Madjid”." Paper PSIK Universitas Paramadina.
- Gerung, R. (2008). "Feminisme versus Kearifan Lokal." Jurnal Perempuan 57.
- Gerung, R. (2010). "Representasi, Kedaulatan, dan Etika Publik." Jentera Jurnal Hukum 20 (5).
- Gerung, R. (2014). "Feminist Ethics against Stigma of Theocracy-Patriarchy: a Reflection of 2014 Presidential Election." Jurnal Perempuan 19 (3): 175–182.
- Gerung, R. (2016). "Feminist Pedagogy: A Political Position." Jurnal Perempuan 21 (3): 265–271.

== Controversies ==
=== Reporting of Rocky to the police ===
On 1 December 2021, the MovementD of Nusantara Advocates (Perekat Nusantara) officially reported Rocky Gerung and four other opposition figures Refly Harun, Adi Masardi, Natalius Pigai, and Hersubeno Arief to the Indonesian National Police at 11:00 AM local time for their hate speeches, especially those directed against Romo Benny Susetyo, the special staff of the Pancasila Ideology Education Body's directing council for intervening the Indonesian Ulema Council (MUI), and also including Bishops' Conference of Indonesia (KWI) and the Catholic Church. Perekat Nusantara also additionally reported Rocky's YouTube channel, Rocky Gerung Official.

In his YouTube channel, Rocky reacts to the reports of him by Perekat Nusantara by saying: "It is a stupid thing. [It is] useless". Rocky also said that the current president of Indonesia, Joko Widodo, had failed to embody the equality of all Indonesian citizens. Romo Benny threatened to arrest Rocky and other four figures of the so-called "pro-democracy movement" but Nicho Silalahi said that Jesus Christ is merciful even to the opponents. Emanuel Herdiyanto also said that Romo Benny's post about MUI were his personal opinions rather than the Catholic Church's stance. According to the Catholic activist Leonardus Sugiman, Romo Benny must be thankful to the pro-democracy figures including Rocky, and placing himself as an independent figure and an enlightener for all Catholic practitioners.
