= Alexander Aan =

Indonesian atheist and prisoner

- Born: Alexander An; 1981 (age 43–44)
- Occupation(s): Ex Civil Servant, Mathematics Teacher
- Known for: 2012 arrest for comments on religion

Alexander Aan (born 1981) is an Indonesian atheist and ex-Muslim of Minang descent. He was imprisoned in 2012 for posting comments and images to Facebook that were judged to be "disseminating information aimed at inciting religious hatred or hostility" by the Muaro Sijunjung district court. The sentence sparked national debate and caused Amnesty International to designate him a prisoner of conscience.

== Arrest and trial ==
Prior to his arrest, Aan was a civil servant in the Pulau Punjung subdistrict of West Sumatra province. Though he had been raised as a Muslim, Aan raised doubts about its god by age 11, and stopped participating in religious rituals in 2008. In January 2012, he posted to an atheist Facebook group he had joined, writing, "If God exists, why do bad things happen? ... There should only be good things if God is merciful." Aan declared heaven, hell, angels, and devils to be "myths". He also posted an article describing Mohammad as "attracted to his daughter-in-law". The posts were seen by the Indonesian Council of Ulema, who reported him to the police for blasphemy. (Note: Indonesia supports the freedom of religion of members of only six religions: Islam, Catholicism, Protestantism, Confucianism, Buddhism, and Hinduism. Members of religious minorities often face persecution.) On 18 January, an angry mob attacked Aan on his way to work, causing police to take him into protective custody. Two days later, he was charged with "disseminating information aimed at inciting religious hatred or hostility". The district police chief also stated that Aan had lied on his application for his government job, claiming to be Muslim. On 14 June, the Muaro Sijunjung district court found Aan guilty of "disseminating information aimed at inciting religious hatred or hostility" and sentenced him to two and a half years imprisonment and a fine of 100 million rupiahs (US$10,600). During the sentencing, the presiding judge described Aan's actions as having "caused anxiety to the community and tarnished Islam". On 27 January 2014, Aan was released from prison.

== Reactions ==
Aan's arrest caused "outrage" among both domestic and international religious freedom activists, and several petitions were circulated calling for his release. Setara Institute director Hendardi described the requested sentence as "excessive", a demonstration of "the arbitrariness of the law and law enforcement officials", and a violation of the International Covenant on Civil and Political Rights, to which Indonesia is a signatory. Amnesty International responded by designating Alexander a prisoner of conscience, describing the sentence as "a serious setback for freedom of expression in Indonesia". The organization called for Alexander's immediate release. Human Rights Watch stated that Alexander's sentence suggested "a threat to Indonesia's religious minorities" in light of recent attacks by extremists. The Asian Human Rights Commission also called for Alexander's release, stating that his actions did not "pose a threat to public order" and were covered by freedom of religion.

Atheist Alliance International began a campaign on Aan's behalf, stating that his case "highlights the fundamental principles of freedom of expression and freedom of conscience and the discrimination faced by atheists, particularly in Islamic countries." An opinion column in The Jakarta Globe described the charges as "a blight on Indonesia's democratic credentials" and a threat to Indonesia's attractiveness to foreign investors.

The Center for Inquiry, first supporting the petition of the Asian Human Rights Commission, organized a protest outside the Indonesian Embassy in Washington, DC on 18 June 2012, calling for Indonesian authorities to release and exonerate Aan. A second CFI-organized protest outside the Indonesian Consulate in New York City took place on July 6. CFI also sent a letter demanding Aan's release to the Indonesian Embassy through its Office of Public Policy.

The Islamic Society Forum, a coalition of far right Islamist groups, stated that the potential five-year sentence was not enough and that Aan should be executed. The organization's secretary-general stated, "What he has done cannot be tolerated... it is important to prevent this group from spreading atheism in this country." The atheist Facebook group which he founded saw a surge in membership, up to 2,000. However, most of these were against atheists and Aan; some postings included calls for atheists to be beheaded and calling them cowards.

== See also ==
- Anti-atheism in Indonesia
- Discrimination against atheists in Indonesia
- Human rights in Indonesia
- Religion in Indonesia
