= Death railway =

Death railway may refer to:

- Burma Railway
- Sumatra Railway
- Salekhard–Igarka Railway
- Death Railway (Spyforce Episode)
