= Rites of Ash =

American rock band

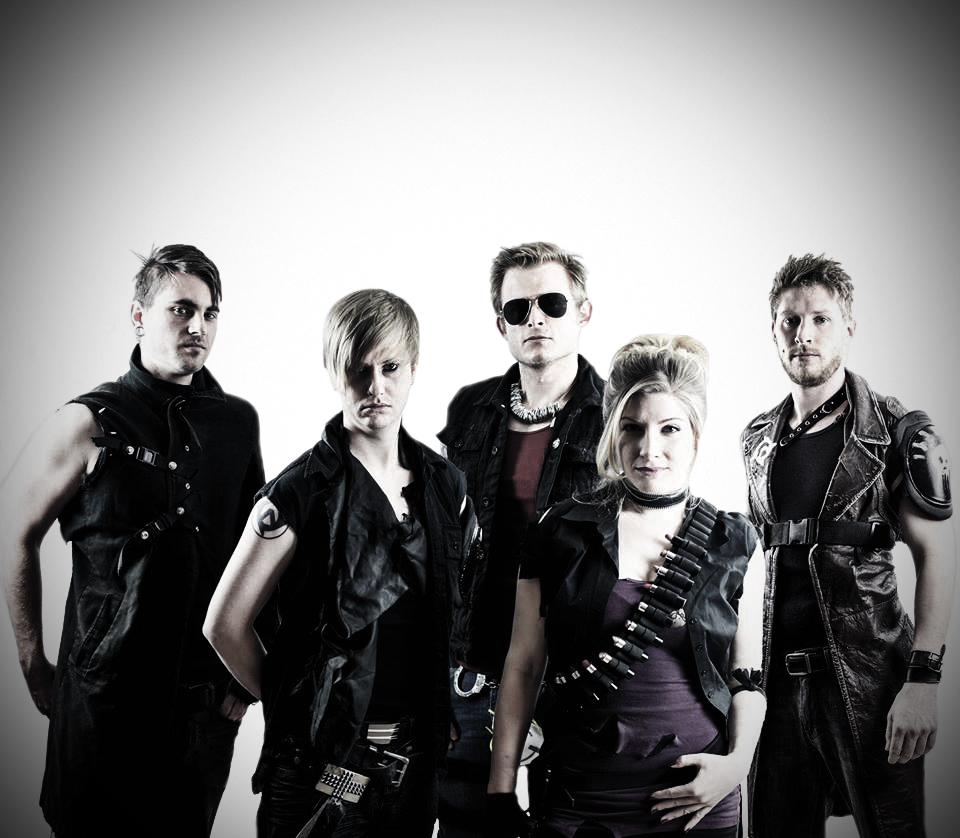

Background information
- Origin: Washington, DC, USA
- Genres: Rock, pop, electronic rock, alternative metal
- Years active: 2006–present
- Label: DJ Boy Records
- Members: Alex (80-two); Lazzo; Toni; Tuomas Easton; Josh (Ace) Finks; MCO
- Past members: Fester; Sir Deville; Che Colovita; Lumer; Berry; Tevey
- Website: ritesofash.com

Rites of Ash is an American rock band from Washington, DC, formed in 2006 by Alex (80-two) and Lazzo.

== History ==
=== Formation (2004–2006) ===
The band started as an experiment between founder Lazzo and Adam Acampora while at college. During his last semester of college, founder Lazzo decided to add additional members and brought on front-man Alex (80-two). The two finished recording the debut record Beautiful Illusions (released in 2006). The lineup was completed in December 2005 with the addition of Fester on drums.

The Rites of Ash logo used since Beautiful Illusions

=== Beautiful Illusions (2006) ===
The band officially formed in September 2006 with the release of Beautiful Illusions. This record contained 10 tracks, all with sequenced drums and bass guitar. In June 2007, Fester was replaced by Sir Deville.

=== Epidemic of the Mannequins (2007–2009) ===
Soon after drummer Sir Deville joined the band in late 2007, the band decided to re-record Beautiful Illusions with live drums and a more organic overall sound. Additional tracks, including a cover of Billy Joel's Pressure, were added to the original 10 songs. A second disc was produced featuring remixed tracks by DJ Idee, DJ Paul Edge, and Pablo Manzarek (son of Ray Manzarek from 'The Doors'). A re-mixed/re-mastered version of this album was released in 2008.

=== "Burn" (2009) ===
Released as an early single from the forthcoming record, Like Venom, "Burn" gained notoriety when its music video was featured in August 2009 on Fuse On-Demand. The song and video featured bassist Che Colovita (AKA Che Lemon) of Jimmie's Chicken Shack.

=== Like Venom (2009–2011) ===
Rites of Ash's third studio album and fifth overall release combined more dance and hip-hop elements. On Tap Magazine called this album, "Reminiscent of Linkin Park and T-Pain (if they had a love child, it would absolutely be Like Venom), Rites of Ash make use of technology to influence and put their sound above the rest." This album was mixed by Kevin "131" Gutierrez (Assembly Line Studios) and mastered by Bill Wolf (Wolf Productions).

Shortly after the release of this album, the band signed with manager Billy Zero and independent record label DJ Boy Records. The album was nominated for two WAMA Awards for Best Modern Rock Group and Best Modern Rock Recording.

=== She's Out For Blood (2011–2013) ===
Rites of Ash rounded out their lineup by bringing in Tevey (drums), Toni (vocals), Tuomas (keyboards), and Ace (bass). The band released a music video for the single "Killing Me" alongside the release of the EP. The music video Molly was released in December 2012. In August 2012, the band was a featured artist on the Dew Tour in Ocean City, MD.

The band began working with Jeff Bova and Kevin "131" Gutierrez on their next full-length album to be released in 2014.

=== Kept Me Up All Night (2013–2014) ===
This album features 10 dance/dubstep remixes of selected Rites of Ash's songs off of She's Out for Blood and the soon-to-be-released full-length LP. This record is set for release in all digital stores on August 5, 2013; remixes by Lazzo, KRNOS, and Pablo Manzarek.

In October 2013, the band welcomed their new drummer, Crash Boom Bang's MCO. In February 2014, the band was nominated for three Wammy (WAMA) Awards: Best Electronica Artist and Best Electronica Recording (which they won); Lazzo was nominated for Producer of the Year.

=== "Separate Ways (Worlds Apart)" (2014) ===
On September 8, 2014, Rites of Ash released their cover of "Separate Ways (Worlds Apart)", a tribute to the track by the legendary band Journey. In addition to releasing the single, the band made a shot-for-shot remake of the original 1983 music video. The video was directed by former Crash Boom Bang bassist/keyboardist, Raul Rivero and Risemont Studios.

=== Kill For Love (2014–present) ===
Rites of Ash released their full-length album Kill For Love on October 31, 2014. A culmination of over two years of work, this album featured 14 tracks. This album was recorded and mixed at Feedback Studios, Bovaland, and Assembly Line Studios; produced by: Lazzo; mixing engineers: Jeff Bova and Kevin "131" Gutierrez; mastering engineer: Michael Roberts of Hurt. The band was nominated for a WAMA award for Best Modern Rock Group in February 2015.

== Discography ==
LPs

- Kill For Love (2014)
- Kept Me Up All Night (2013)
- Like Venom (2010)
- Epidemic of the Mannequins (2008)
- Beautiful Illusions (2006)

EPs

- She's Out For Blood (2012)

Singles

- Buried Alive (2023)
- Hallo Spaceboy (2018)
- City Sleeps (Six Feet Deep) (2015)
- Separate Ways (Worlds Apart) (2014)
- Bad Romance (2010)
- Burn (2009)

== Videography ==
- Separate Ways (Worlds Apart) (2014)
- Molly (2012)
- Killing Me (2012)
- Burn (2009)
