= McLean High School =

High school in McLean, Virginia

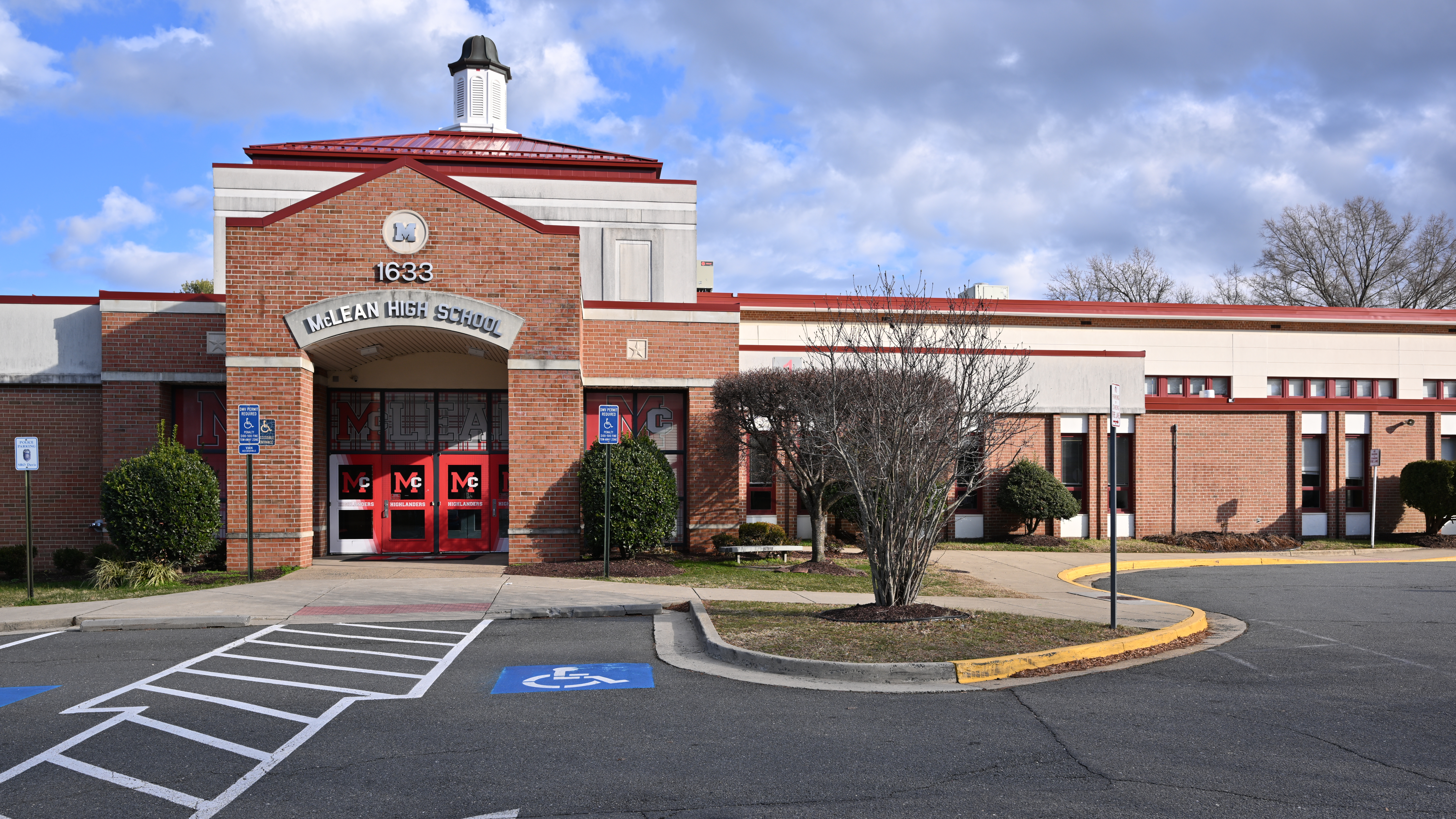

Location
- 1633 Davidson Road; McLean, Fairfax, Virginia 22101; United States; 38°55′24″N 77°11′07″W

Information
- Type: Public secondary
- Established: May 5, 1955; 71 years ago
- School district: Fairfax County Public Schools
- NCES District ID: 5101260
- School code: VA-029-0290790
- CEEB code: 471395
- NCES School ID: 510126000538
- Principal: Raven Jones
- Teaching staff: 136.83 (on an FTE basis)
- Grades: 9–12
- Enrollment: 2,414 (2024-2025)
  - Grade 9: 578
  - Grade 10: 584
  - Grade 11: 628
  - Grade 12: 624
- Student to teacher ratio: 17.28:1
- Language: English
- Campus type: Suburban
- Colors: Red & silver
- Athletics conference: Liberty District; Northern Region
- Nickname: Highlanders
- Rivals: Langley High School; Madison High School; George C. Marshall High School
- USNWR ranking: 218
- Newspaper: The Highlander
- Yearbook: Caledonia
- Feeder schools: Longfellow Middle School
- Website: fcps.edu/McLeanHS

McLean High School is a public high school within the Fairfax County Public Schools in McLean, Virginia, United States. In 2024, U.S. News & World Report rated McLean the 218th-best U.S. public high school, and fifth-best in Virginia.

== History ==
Fairfax County Public Schools purchased a 22-acre tract for $32,443 for McLean High School on August 6, 1952. McLean High opened its doors on September 6, 1955, with an enrollment of 1,031 students from grades 8 through 11 with Principal Craighill S. Burks. At the time, McLean was the newest high school in Fairfax County, and the only high school located in McLean since the Franklin Sherman School, originally built in 1914, closed in the late 1930s. McLean High celebrated its 50th reunion in 2005.

The town of McLean received its name from John Roll McLean, an Ohio native who was the owner and publisher of The Washington Post and one of the founders of the Washington and Old Dominion Railroad. A railroad stop named after McLean was once located at the intersection of Old Dominion Drive and Chain Bridge Road, about a mile from the high school's current location. The McLean community combined two existing villages, Lewinsville and Langley.

== Demographics ==
In the 2023–24 school year, McLean High School had 2431 students (as of May 2024), and its student body was:

- 47.9% White
- 26.2% Asian/Pacific Islander
- 14.9% Hispanic
- 4.3% Black
- 6.3% two or more races

Due to the school's growing enrollment, which had increased by over 550 students since 2006, the Fairfax County School Board adopted a boundary change in February 2021 to move some of McLean's students to Langley High School, which received a significant expansion during the school's recent renovation. The boundary change is being phased in gradually and will not take full effect until the 2025–26 school year, when all students from the reassigned neighborhoods will be attending Langley. While FCPS relocated a temporary modular to the McLean campus in 2021, McLean remains one of FCPS' most overcrowded high schools, and FCPS has declined to fund a permanent addition to the school.

== Curriculum ==
McLean High School is a fully-accredited high school based on Virginia's Standards of Learning tests. The average SAT score for McLean's Class of 2024 was 1308 (including both Critical Reading and Writing and Math), the second-highest among Fairfax County's 25 high and secondary schools. In addition, the Classes of 2022, 2023, and 2024 at McLean had the second-highest number of National Merit Semifinalists of any high school in Fairfax County, behind only Thomas Jefferson High School for Science and Technology, and the participation and success rates of McLean students on Advanced Placement exams typically are among the highest in Fairfax County Public Schools.

== Extracurricular activities ==
=== Quiz Bowl ===
McLean Quiz Bowl won the Class 6 VHSL State Championship in 2020 and 2024 and has finished as State Runners-Up in 2017, 2018, 2022, and 2023. The team has had three top 50 finishes at the NAQT High School National Championship Tournament finishing in 24th place in 2022 and 33rd in 2023. They also won the Washington DC Region It's Academic championship in 2022 and 2023.

=== The Highlander ===
McLean also has an award-winning newspaper, The Highlander. In 2006, it was inducted into the high school newspaper Hall of Fame after ten consecutive years of being an "All American". Since the paper's first publication, it has gone from a newspaper format to a news magazine format. In 2012, the newspaper also launched a website publication, The Highlander Online.

In 2017, The Highlander was one of 49 high school publications nationwide to be named a finalist for the National Scholastic Press Association's Pacemaker Award. In 2020, The Highlander was one of 28 high school publications nationwide to be a finalist for the Pacemaker Award, and the student newspaper was one of 65 finalists for the Pacemaker Award in 2021. In 2019, The Highlander was a finalist for the Columbia Scholastic Press Association's Crown Award for student journalism. Individual articles that have received recognition have addressed topics such as refugees in Northern Virginia, gender identity, and student-athletes with concussions.

=== Yearbook ===
The Clan was the original name of McLean's award-winning yearbook. In 2004, The Clan was inducted into the National Scholastic Press Association Hall of Fame after ten years of consecutively being "All American". The yearbook's name was changed to Caledonia in 2019.

== Music programs ==
In 2024, McLean High School received the Virginia Music Educators Association (VMEA) Blue Ribbon Award, which "recognizes achieved excellence in Band, Orchestra, and Choral Performance." McLean High School also regularly sends students to All-Virginia band, orchestra, and choir ensembles.

=== Band ===
McLean's band program is currently conducted by Chris Weise, who took over the direction of the band at the beginning of the 2008–2009 school year. Under Weise, McLean received the Sudler Flag of Honor, an award granted by the John Philip Sousa Foundation for consistent superior musical performance, in 2018, one of only seven bands in the country that have earned the award twice.

Mclean's concert band program is divided into three main ensembles: the Concert Band, the Wind Ensemble, and the Symphonic Band (the school's premiere band). McLean also has two jazz bands, the Jazz Workshop and Jazz Ensemble, under the direction of Scott Weinhold. The Chamber Winds/Ensemble program at the school is led by Deidra Denson, and performs at national competitions, including Music For All's 2018 Chamber Music Festival in Indianapolis. McLean High School also has a marching band. The McLean Highlander Marching Band, headed by Weise, has won numerous awards and titles. In 2016, 2017, 2023, and 2024, the band won the USBands Virginia State Championship.

=== Choir ===
Linda Martin conducts McLean's choral program. Under Martin, the McLean chorus was ranked 9th in the nation in 2009, as the only non-performing arts school in the top 10. The program consists of four choruses: Treble (women), Bass (men), Armonia (women), and Madrigals (mixed).

=== Orchestra ===
McLean High School alum Starlet Smith conducts the McLean Orchestra program. It consists of five orchestras: Concert, Symphonic, Sinfonia, Chamber and Philharmonic. McLean belongs to District XII of the Virginia Band & Orchestra Directors Association. The McLean High School Philharmonic Orchestra has participated in a musical exchange program with a sister school, Grabbe Gymnasium, in Detmold, Germany for over 20 years. In alternating years, musicians from the Grabbe Gymnasium travel to McLean and collaborate on a joint concert with McLean's Philharmonic Orchestra, while McLean Philharmonic musicians travel to Detmold for a similar experience with their German counterparts.

== Athletics ==
The school plays in the Liberty District and the Group 6A North Region. Their mascot is the Highlander, a soldier in a Scottish regiment from the Highlands. Their primary rival school is Langley High School, which is also in McLean. Other rival schools include Marshall High School in Falls Church, Madison High School in Vienna, and Yorktown High School in Arlington.

=== Baseball ===
The Highlanders baseball team has captured multiple district titles and participated in regional playoffs. From 2006 to 2012, they were coached by John Thomas (MHS '96, Virginia '00) and compiled a 60–31 record and district and regional playoff berths yearly. In 2009 the Highlanders captured the Liberty District regular season and tournament titles. The Highlanders ended the season with a 1–0 loss to Centreville High School in the first round of the region tournament. In 2010, the Highlanders repeated as regular-season champions and compiled a 17–3 record, 13–1 in the district, and finished 19–5. The Highlanders entered the 2010 season ranked No. 1 by the Northern Region coaches poll and held the rank for the entire season. The Washington Post ranked McLean as the 2nd best team in the entire season of the Northern Virginia/Southern Maryland/DC metro area. The Highlanders failed to win the District, falling to James Madison High School in the title game. They advanced to the quarterfinals of the Northern Region Tournament, where they lost 13–10 to Oakton High School.

In 2014, under new head coach John Dowling, the Highlanders were the Region 6A North runner-up to Chantilly High School, qualifying for the state tournament for the first time in the school's history. In 2019, Dowling's baseball team won the Liberty District championship by defeating Yorktown High School. The team repeated as Liberty District champions in 2022. In 2024, the McLean baseball team, still under Dowling, won the VHSL Class 6 state title, defeating South Lakes High School 15–5 in the championship game. The team repeated as Liberty District champions in 2025.

=== Basketball ===
The Highlanders boys basketball team is coached by Mike O'Brien, and previously was coached by Kevin Roller, who compiled an 82–69 record over six seasons. In the 2011–12 season, under Roller, the Highlander boys won the Liberty District in a double-overtime victory over Fairfax High School. That team finished 24–4, after beating Centreville High School and Lake Braddock Secondary School in the first two rounds of the regional tournament before falling to eventual regional champion Westfield High School in the semifinals. The team had another winning season under Roller in 2012–13, finishing the year as the district runner-up and again making it to the regional playoffs.

In the 2018–19 season, one of O'Brien's four winning seasons since taking over in 2013, the boys compiled a 17–10 record and finished tied for second in the Liberty District behind South Lakes High School. During the regional playoffs, led by Maine commit Matias Prock, the Highlanders defeated Oakton High School, for their first regional win since 2012, before falling to Patriot High School. The boys' team also had winning seasons in 2022-23 and 2023–24, finishing tied for third in the Liberty District each year. In the 2024–25 season, the boys' team finished fourth in the Liberty District during the regular season, but upset three higher seeded opponents (Langley, Yorktown, and Marshall) during the district tournament to win the Liberty District title, the team's first district title since 2011–12.

The Highlanders girls' basketball team was coached by Jen Sobota from 2013 to 2023 and has enjoyed more success than the boys' team in recent years. The girls' team defeated South Lakes High School to win the Liberty District championship in 2018–19, compiling an 18–7 record. District and region player-of-the-year Elizabeth Dufrane became McLean's all-time leading scorer in the 2019–20 season, in which the girls' team finished 17-10 and defeated Oakton in the regional playoffs before falling to state co-champion Madison High School in the semifinals. The new scoring record by Dufrane now sits at 1,563 points, breaking the school's previous record of 1,306. The girls' basketball team also won the Liberty District championship again in 2022–23, defeating rival Langley High School in the district championship. Longtime area basketball coach Pat Deegan took over as the head of the girls' program in the fall of 2023. In Deegan's first year as coach, the McLean girls again won the 2023-24 Liberty District title, once more defeating rival Langley in the championship game.

=== Crew ===
Crew is a club sport at McLean, recognized by the Virginia Scholastic Rowing Association rather than by the Virginia High School League. In recent years, both the boys' and girls' crew teams have enjoyed success, with the boys' varsity eight winning back-to-back VASRA state titles in 2018 and 2019 (one of only five schools in the state to capture more than one VASRA varsity eight championship) and the girls' varsity eight finishing as the state runner-up in 2019. In 2021, the boys' crew team won gold in all varsity 8+ events, and the girls' first varsity eight took bronze. In 2022, the boys' crew team's first varsity eight finished second to Wakefield High but again won the overall points trophy at the VASRA championships. In 2023, the boys' crew team returned to form, and won the first, second, third, and fourth varsity races at the VASRA championships. In 2024, the boys' crew team earned silver in the first, second, and third varsity races at the VASRA championships. In 2025, the boys' crew team made history by becoming the first varsity eight in the school's history to medal at a national regatta after getting third place at the CSSRA Championships in St. Catharines, Ontario, Canada.

Rowers at McLean have been recruited to numerous colleges and universities since 2012, including, but not limited to: Boston College, Colgate, Cornell, George Washington University, MIT, the Naval Academy, Ohio State, Oregon State, Princeton, Tufts, the University of Virginia, and Yale University. Two Olympic rowers have also hailed from McLean's rowing program. Sam Stitt and Giuseppe Lanzone both raced in the at the 2008 Summer Olympics, with Lanzone racing in the men's coxless four and Stitt competing in the men's quadruple sculls event.

=== Cross country ===
The Highlander boys' cross-country team won the Northern Region title in 1968, and the Liberty District titles in 2024 and 2025. The girls' cross country team won the Liberty District title in 2019 and 2021. The 2021 team went on to win the Virginia Northern Region title and eventually finished runner-up at the Virginia Class 6 state meet.

=== Esports ===
Recognized by the Virginia High School League, McLean's varsity esports team was founded in 2022, joining PlayVS's Virginia VHSL Rocket League. In its debut season, the team finished 9th out of 102 teams in the regular season with a record of 6–1, qualifying it for the playoffs, where it finished top 32 in the state.

=== Football ===
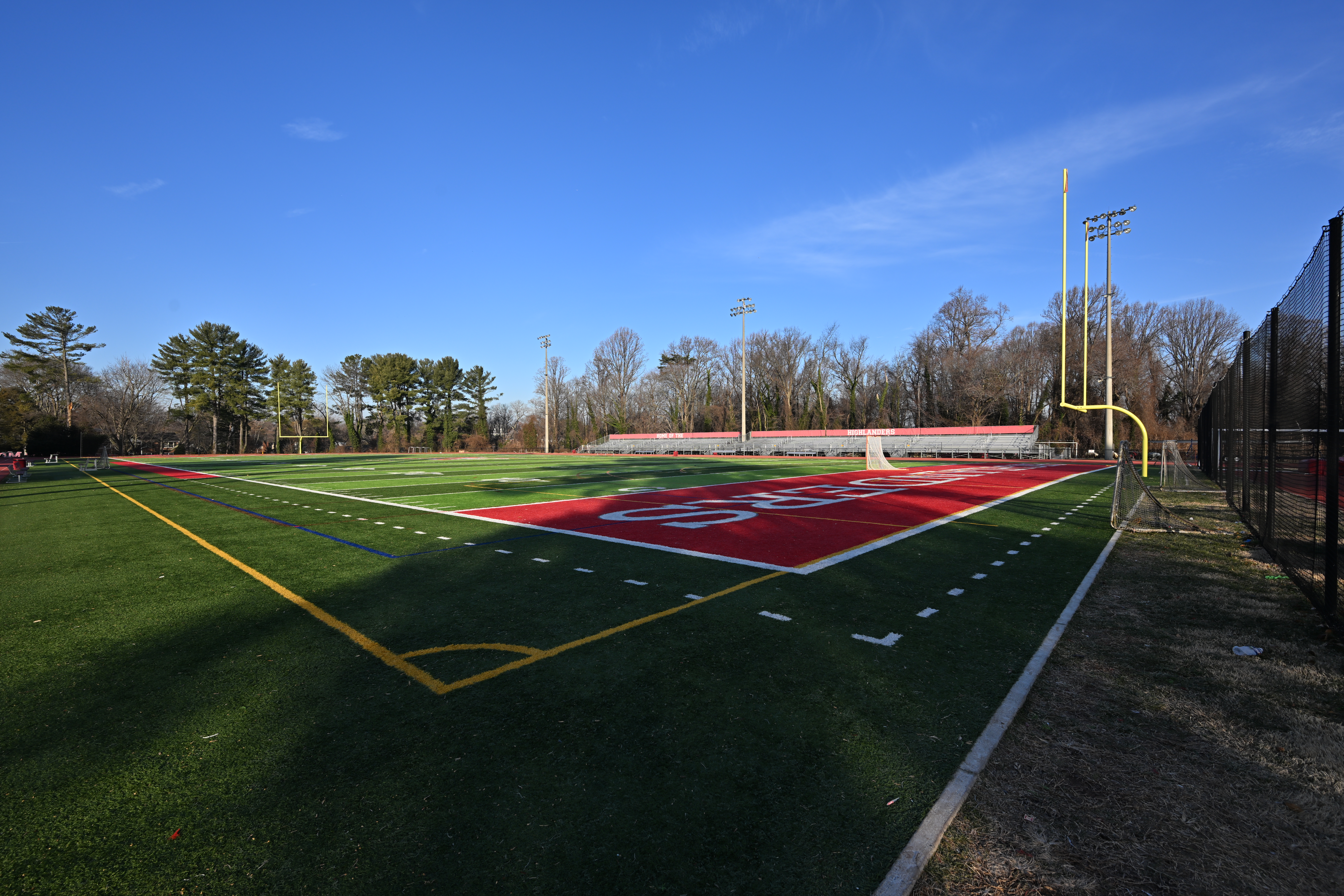
McLean High School football field

McLean's football team finished the 1980 season 10–1, led by future Notre Dame and New York Giants player Eric Dorsey. The Highlanders were also one of the top teams in the Northern Region in the 1990s. In 1995, the Highlanders finished 12-1 and played Virginia powerhouse Hampton High in the state semifinal. They also won numerous district titles and went to the regional playoffs in 1992, 1996, and 1997.

In McLean's 2016 season, the Highlanders' varsity team went 1–11. The varsity team's only win was against Fairfax High School (Fairfax, Virginia), which was the homecoming game. The Highlanders were up by 1 when Fairfax attempted a field goal within the last minute. A McLean player blocked the field goal, and another McLean player, Amir McCormick, returned the ball for a touchdown, securing the 28–20 victory and handing McLean their only win of the season. This ending to the game was reported on multiple local news outlets as a miracle for McLean.

The 2020 and 2021 squads finished 4-3 (second in the Liberty District) and 3–7, respectively. After two losing seasons in 2022 and 2023, the Highlanders returned with a strong 8–2 season in 2023 under new coach Joe Cockerham, with key victories over rivals Yorktown and Langley.

=== Ice hockey ===
The Highlanders are a founding member of the Northern Virginia Scholastic Hockey League and have made the playoffs at least nine times. Under the guidance of head coach John Sherlock, the Highlanders advanced to the 2010–2011 NVSHL championship game before falling 7–2 to the Stone Bridge Bulldogs. The Highlanders subsequently teamed with Chantilly High School to compete as a "McTilly" squad in the NVSHL.

=== Soccer ===
The McLean girls' soccer team won the 2011 state championship; the 2021 team won both the Liberty District and Northern Region titles.

The boys' team, currently coached by Leland Jameson, has been one of the stronger programs in the Northern Region in recent years. The 2022 team finished as Northern Region runner-up and the 2024 squad captured the Northern Region title, defeating Herndon, and then finished as VHSL Class 6 runner-up, losing to an undefeated Cosby High School team 2–1 in the state championship in triple overtime. The 2024 team also ended the spring season as the top-rated boys soccer team in Northern Virginia, according to the Washington Post. The 2025 team also won the Liberty District championship.

=== Softball ===
The McLean softball team has had two Virginia state championship wins. In 2010, McLean girls softball was the VHSL AAA state champions. In the spring of 2023, McLean's girls' softball team was the Liberty District champion, and went on to win the VHSL Class 6 State championship.

=== Swim and dive ===
The Highlander swim team has enjoyed success in the past several years, winning the Liberty District Championships in 2021 and 2024. The team has had several successful athletes who have been recruited to swim and dive at Yale University, the University of Pennsylvania, University of Wisconsin, UT Austin, the US Air Force Academy, and University of Pittsburgh.

=== Track & field ===
The Highlander boys' track & field team won the Liberty District title in indoor track in 2004 and 2005. The 2004 team went on to win the outdoor Liberty District title. The girls' track & field team won the Liberty District titles in 1998 and 2022.

=== Volleyball ===
The Highlanders girls' volleyball team, coached by Samantha Stewart, won the Liberty District title in 2021 and advanced to the Northern Region final. One highlight of the 2021 season was defeating Langley during both the regular season and the regional playoffs.

The Highlanders boys' volleyball team was created in 2024, and won the Liberty District and Northern Region titles in their inaugural year. That year, they advanced to the state semifinals where they lost to Kellam High School. The boys' team captured the Liberty District title again in 2025.

=== State championships and runner-up finishes ===
State championships

- AAA Girls Field Hockey in 1986
- AAA Softball in 2010
- AAA Girls Soccer in 2011
- VHSL Class 6 Girls Gymnastics in 2015
- VHSL Class 6 Girls Gymnastics in 2017
- VHSL Class 6 Boys Tennis in 2017
- VSRA Boys Varsity Crew in 2018
- VSRA Boys Varsity Crew in 2019
- VHSL Class 6 Scholastic Bowl in 2020
- VSRA Boys Varsity Crew in 2021
- VSRA Boys Varsity Crew in 2023
- VHSL Class 6 Girls Softball in 2023
- VHSL Class 6 Scholastic Bowl in 2024
- VHSL Class 6 Baseball in 2024

Also,

- 1st place in the AAA Wachovia Cup for Academics in 1999–2000
- Washington, D.C. region It's Academic champions in 2022 and 2023.

== TheatreMcLean ==
TheatreMcLean is the theatre department for McLean High School. The department produces two mainstage productions annually, one play and one musical.

== Mascot ==
The school considered itself "The Eagles" before becoming "The Highlanders". Girls' sports teams were known as "The Bald Eagles". The mascot was changed to its current form today in 1958 after a school-wide vote to reference instead 'the Scottish heritage' of McLean, Virginia, with boys' teams being called The Highlanders and girls' The Lady Highlanders. However, the area is not known for having any significant Scottish settlements. It is more likely that the name was inspired by the Union forces of the 79th New York "Highlanders", formed largely by Scottish immigrants and known for their unique blue and red uniforms. The 79th New York fought in multiple Civil War battles such as Bull Run, Antietam, and Fort Wagner. They were stationed in the Washington, D.C. area at multiple points during the war and fought a minor battle near Lewinsville Park in 1861, just a short distance from McLean, which may have influenced the school's choice of mascot.

== Notable alumni ==
- Ayanna Alexander, Olympic track and field athlete for Trinidad and Tobago
- Sharyn Alfonsi (1990), DuPont and Emmy award-winning correspondent for 60 Minutes
- Aldrich Ames (1959), CIA officer; convicted in 1994 of spying for the Soviet Union
- Rose Arce (1982), executive producer of Starfish Media Group
- Gadis Arivia, Indonesian feminist activist and scholar, founder of Jurnal Perempuan
- Dave Bartis, film and television producer best known for Suits, The O.C., and Edge of Tomorrow
- Elizabeth Cheney (1984), former Deputy Assistant Secretary of State for Near Eastern Affairs; former member of the U.S. House of Representatives from Wyoming's at-large district; daughter of former vice president Dick Cheney
- Mary Cheney (1987), daughter of former vice president Dick Cheney
- Eric Dorsey (1982), led McLean to a 10–1 season in 1981; started in Super Bowl XXV for the New York Giants
- Gregory Fu (1981), professor of organic chemistry at the California Institute of Technology and the Norman Chandler Professor of Chemistry; elected member of the National Academy of Sciences (2014)
- Nassir Ghaemi, psychiatrist, author, and Professor of Psychiatry at Tufts University School of Medicine
- Wolfe Glick, competitive Pokémon player, streamer and YouTuber
- Duff Goldman (1992), baker, cake designer; star of Food Network show, Ace of Cakes; considers his McLean art teacher, Jeffrey Meizlik, his biggest inspiration
- Seth Greisinger (1993), baseball player, played in 1996 Olympics (bronze medal), with Yomiuri Giants in 2009
- Luke Kruytbosch, race track announcer at Churchill Downs
- Giuseppe Lanzone (2001), member of the US Olympic rowing team at the 2008 Summer Olympics in Beijing; sat 3 seat of the Men's Four w/o
- Gloria Cordes Larson, lawyer, former president of Bentley University
- Emma Lord (2009), young adult fiction author; her novel You Have a Match was chosen as Reese's Book Club's YA pick in winter of 2021
- Marcia McDermott (1983), soccer player and coach
- Ann Sommovigo Moore (1968), CEO, Time, Inc.
- Anne Marie Pace (1983), children's author of many picture books, including the Vampirina series
- William F. Readdy (1970), astronaut; flew three missions
- L. Felipe Restrepo (1977), federal judge, United States Court of Appeals for the Third Circuit
- Omar Ruiz, lead singer of the pop rock band Crash Boom Bang
- Sergio Salas (1999), former footballer drafted in the third round of the 2000 MLS SuperDraft by D.C. United
- Josh Sborz (2012), baseball player, drafted by the Los Angeles Dodgers and named College World Series Most Valuable Player in 2015 while attending the University of Virginia; pitched for the Texas Rangers and recorded final seven outs when the Rangers won the 2023 World Series
- Sam Stitt (2000), member of the US Olympic rowing team at the 2008 Summer Olympics in Beijing; sat 2 seat of the men's quadruple sculls
- Richard F. Timmons (1961), former military officer and railroad executive
- Tom Udall (1966), former United States Senator from New Mexico, United States Ambassador to New Zealand and Samoa from 2021 to 2025
- Vern Yip (1986), interior designer who has appeared on design show Trading Spaces; host of the HGTV show Deserving Design
