= Irreligion in Indonesia =

Atheism, or irreligion, in Indonesia, is uncommon among the country's inhabitants, as there is a great stigma attached to being an atheist in Indonesia and it is widely condemned by the Indonesian people.

== Society ==
It is difficult to quantify the number of atheists or agnostics in Indonesia as they are not officially counted in the country's census. Indonesian atheists, such as those belonging to the Indonesian Atheists organization, predominantly communicate with each other solely via the Internet. According to Human Rights Watch, tolerance towards atheists among the general Indonesian public is growing, but they are still subject to violence by "largely militant Islamists." The founder of Pancasila and the first President of Indonesia Sukarno stated that belief in the Almighty as a characteristic of this nation needs to be recognized, even by those who do not believe in God. Accepting the First Precept means not only tolerating religious diversity in Indonesia, but also tolerating those who are irreligious, and asking for tolerance from those who do not have a religion to those who have a religion.

=== Discrimination ===
Atheists are subject to discrimination in Indonesia, seeing as irreligion violates the first principle of Pancasila (i.e. Ketuhanan yang Maha Esa, The One and Almighty God). Religious tolerance in Indonesia is limited to muted acceptance of other religions apart from Islam. Indonesian atheist activists are pursuing their religious freedom.

== Law ==
Freedom of religion is enshrined in the Indonesian Constitution; however, legal protection is afforded only to six recognised faiths of the country—Islam, Protestantism, Catholicism, Buddhism, Hinduism, and Confucianism. B. F. Intan has written that natural law does not require one to follow a particular religion. Atheism as he sees it, however, is used more as an example of harmony between various religions and is not used as grounds to denounce popular religion. This natural law is used as grounds for the creation of a common law, which is more usually employed elsewhere as the basis for laws governing criminal activity or civil disputes. The 7th part of the first precept of Pancasila states “Not forcing a religion and belief in God Almighty to others.”

=== Blasphemy ===
Insulting or interfering with the practice of one of the official faiths stated above in Indonesia can bring a five-year prison term. In the past, prominent atheists have only been prosecuted under religious customary laws, so it is unknown if atheism is prosecutable under secular law.

When declared atheist Alexander Aan wrote in February 2012 on Facebook that God does not exist, he was taken into custody and initially charged with blasphemy. The police claimed that they were doing this to protect him from attackers; however, no charges have been levied against his attackers. He has been prosecuted under the blasphemy law, part of the country's Criminal Code. The Code’s Article 156(a) targets those who deliberately, in public, express feelings of hostility, hatred, or contempt against religions to prevent others from adhering to any religion, and targets those who disgrace a religion. The penalty for violating Article 156(a) is imprisonment, Presidential Decree No. 1/PNPS/1965 on the Prevention of Blasphemy and Abuse of Religions. This incident raised a debate about the legality of atheism versus treating it as a genuine religion.

== See also ==
- Discrimination against atheists
- Religion in Indonesia
