= Sergio Salas =

Bolivian footballer (born 1981)

Personal information
- Full name: Sergio Salas Quinteros
- Date of birth: March 22, 1981 (age 45)
- Place of birth: Cochabamba, Bolivia
- Height: 5 ft 8 in (1.73 m)
- Position: Attacking midfielder

Team information
- Current team: West Texas United Sockers
- Number: 15

Senior career*
Years	Team	Apps	(Gls)
2000	D.C. United	1	(0)
2000	→ MLS Pro 40 (loan)	13	(0)
2002–2004	Northern Virginia Royals	37	(6)
2005–2006	Club Aurora	9	(0)
2006–2007	Municipal Real Mamore	10	(2)
2007	Indios USA		
2008	Club Aurora		
2009	West Texas United Sockers	4	(0)
2009	Real Maryland Monarchs	3	(0)
2011	West Texas United Sockers	2	(0)
- * Club domestic league appearances and goals as of May 21, 2011

Sergio Salas (born March 21, 1981, in Cochabamba) is a Bolivian former footballer who last played for West Texas United Sockers in the USL Second Division.

== Career ==
=== Youth ===
Salas moved from his native Bolivia to the United States as a child, settling with his family in McLean, Virginia. He attended Mclean High School, but chose not to play college soccer, instead turning professional straight out high school when he signed a Project-40 contract with Major League Soccer.

=== Professional ===
Salas was drafted in the third round (27th overall) of the 2000 MLS SuperDraft by D.C. United. He spent most of the season on loan to MLS Pro 40, but played one game, 18 minutes in total for D.C. before being released at the end of the season. Following his release from DC, Salas bounced around the American lower-leagues, playing for Northern Virginia Royals in the USL Second Division, and the amateur Indios USA in the National Premier Soccer League, before signing on with Bolivian pro team Club Aurora in 2005. In 2006 Salas joined Municipal Real Mamore on a one-year loan. That year the Team won the Bolivian 2nd division tournament Simon Bolivar and won promotion to 1st division.

Salas returned to the United States in 2009 to play for the West Texas United Sockers in the USL Premier Development League, before moving to the Real Maryland Monarchs in the USL Second Division.
