= Luke Kruytbosch =

American actor

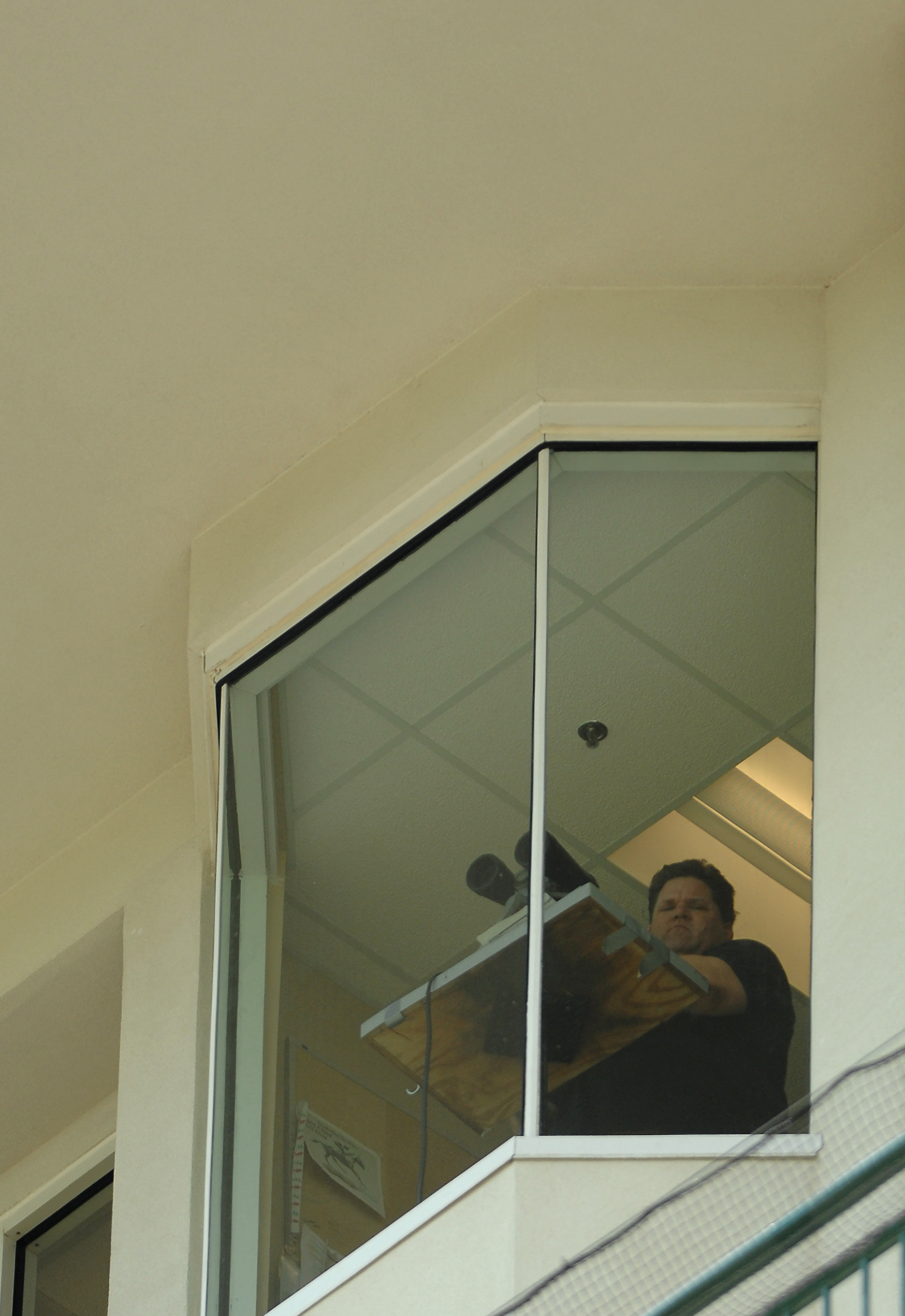
Luke Kruybosch at Churchill Downs shortly before his death at age 47.

Lucas Martin "Luke" Kruytbosch (/ˈkraɪtbɒs/ KRYTE-boss; May 27, 1961 – July 14, 2008) was an American Thoroughbred horse racing announcer. He was best known as the on-track public-address voice of Churchill Downs and Kentucky Derby from 1999 until his death. He also called races at Turf Paradise, Ellis Park Racecourse, Kentucky Downs, Hollywood Park, Sunland Park, Northlands Park and Ruidoso Downs during his career.

In 2007, Kruytbosch's call of the Derby was carried live on ESPN Radio.

Born in Moscow, Idaho, Kruytbosch began announcing horse races on the Arizona County Fair circuit while attending the University of Arizona Race Track Industry Program. After college he began announcing both Thoroughbred and Quarter Horse racing throughout the southwest. He called the world's richest Quarter Horse race, the All American Futurity at Ruidoso Downs, six times. In 1996 he was named track announcer at Hollywood Park Racetrack, then in 1999 he moved on to Churchill Downs in Louisville, Kentucky. During the winter months, Kruytbosch returned to Arizona to call races at Turf Paradise.

During Luke's high school years he was notorious for cutting classes at McLean High School in McLean, Virginia especially on Fridays to attend the pony races at Charlestown Racetrack in West Virginia with several willing friends. It is here where he developed his love for horse racing. Luke was also an excellent offensive lineman on a winning team on junior varsity and varsity football teams at McLean.

Kruytbosch did voice-over work on commercials, including a national ad for Hertz and also voiced-over racecalls on television shows including CBS's Martial Law and The Sentinel.

After calling the day's races at Ellis Park on July 13, 2008, Kruytbosch reportedly told co-workers that he was not feeling well. The following day he was found dead in his Evansville, Indiana apartment after failing to show up for an Ellis Park event. The coroner's office indicated that Kruytbosch likely died of natural causes, possibly heart-related.

About 400 guests attended a funeral service for Kruytbosch at Churchill Downs on July 21, 2008. Kruytbosch's remains were cremated, and his ashes were spread in the Churchill Downs winner's circle after the service.

Kruytbosch is survived by his father, Carlos, his sister, Carla, and a brother-in-law.
