= Billy Zero =

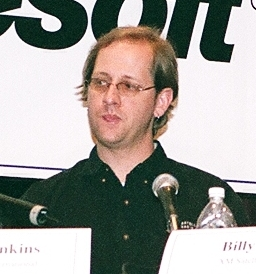
- Born: William Gallagher; 1971 (age 54–55); Fort Meade, Maryland
- Occupation: Lego collector

William Gallagher, better known by his on-air name Billy Zero, is former American radio personality. Born in Fort Meade, Maryland in 1971, he is best known for his work at Baltimore and Washington radio stations. He performed in many bands in the 90's including Love Muffin Prowler, Mentle Gen and Naked Lunch.

Gallagher worked at the WHFS, 99.1 FM from December 1994 through February 2000. Zero went to work for Advertising.com in February 2000. Four months later, he left to start his own companies - djboy.com and getbackstage.com. Gallagher was hired by XM Satellite Radio in July 2000. He started out as director of ad sales development, then moved to Music Director of the Unsigned Channel. Gallagher was made the program director of Unsigned when Pat Dinizio of The Smithereens left to focus on his music career. Unsigned was canceled from XM's Lineup in November 2005. Gallagher then went to work on Fred, XM 44 for three months to help out, then went to Big Tracks, a channel that XM launched. Zero moved on to XMU as Program Director where he programmed and played as a DJ indie music on XM 43 until November 2008.

After he was laid off from XM in 2008, he served as program director at WTMD on the campus of Towson University. He left the station the following year.

On January 1, 2010, he started an artist management company called Zero Management. By May 2010, he had eight artists and two agents. His artists included Grammy-nominated artist, Wayna, Emmy-nominated Ellen Cherry, The Hint, Alfonso Velez, Derek Olds, Carolyn Malachi, The Eureka Birds, Will Rast and The Funk Ark.

In January 2012, the Zero Management lineup shifted to focus on career artists. The lineup of managed artists included: Grammy-Nominated Christylez Bacon, Eureka Birds, Derek Olds, Monika Gaba, Rites of Ash, Tobias Russell, The Perfects, Vital and Janine Wilson.

Gallagher shifted away from management in 2013 and focused on DJ Boy Radio. DJ Boy Radio, an audio advertising agency, was launched in 2015. The company's website has since gone offline and a Facebook page has not been updated since 2018.

He was president of the Washington D.C. chapter of the National Academy of Recording Arts & Sciences from 2008 to 2010 and trustee from June 2010 through May 2012.
