= Sumatra Railway =

Inactive railway in Indonesia

Muarakalaban–Muaro–Pekanbaru railway Sumatra Railway
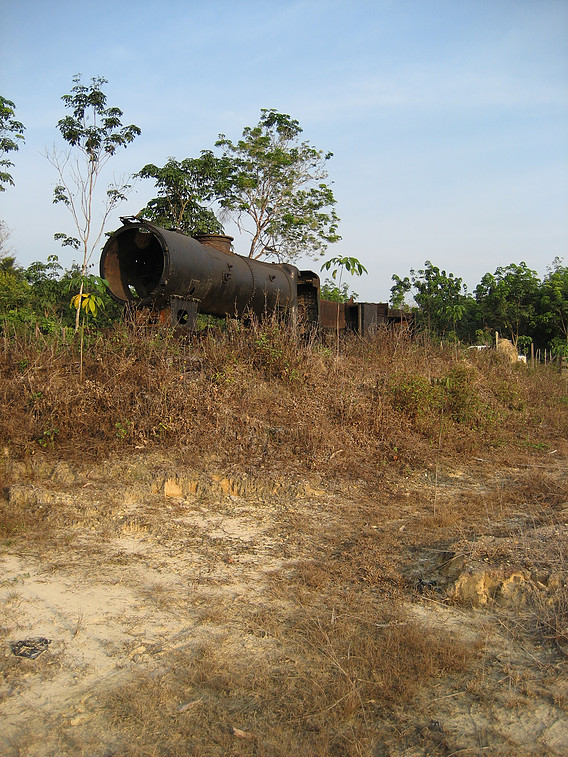
- Locomotive remains along the railway near Lipat Kain, Riau. This site is near the location of POW camp 7.

Overview
- Locale: Muaro to Pekanbaru, Indonesia
- Dates of operation: 1924–2014 (Muarakalaban–Muaro), 1945–1945 (Muaro–Pekanbaru)

Technical
- Track gauge: 1,067 mm (3 ft 6 in)
- Length: 246 kilometres (153 mi)

The Muarakalaban–Muaro–Pekanbaru railway is an inactive railway section in Sumatra, Indonesia. It was a railway project of two parties in two different times, Staatsspoorwegen ter Sumatra's Westkust in the Dutch East Indies era and Rikuyu Sokyuku of the Imperial Japanese Army during the Second World War.

Of the 246 km long railway, the 220 km Muaro–Pekanbaru segment (also referred to as the Sumatra Railway or Pekanbaru Death Railway) was created by the Japanese to connect Pekanbaru (now in Riau) to Muaro (now in West Sumatra) in an effort to strengthen the military and logistical infrastructure for coal and troop shipments. It would connect the Strait of Malacca, via the Siak River in Pekanbaru, to Padang (with its Padang Station) via an existing railway from Muaro. The railway was completed on Victory over Japan Day, 15 August 1945. It was only ever used to transport prisoners of war out of the area but quickly became overgrown by the jungle.

Currently only the Muarakalaban–Muaro portion of the railway still exists, though the line and stations are inactive; those assets were owned by Regional Division II West Sumatra of Kereta Api Indonesia. There is a plan by the Ministry of Transportation to rebuild the railway as part of Trans-Sumatra railway project, which would connect four separate railway tracks across Sumatra island.

== History ==
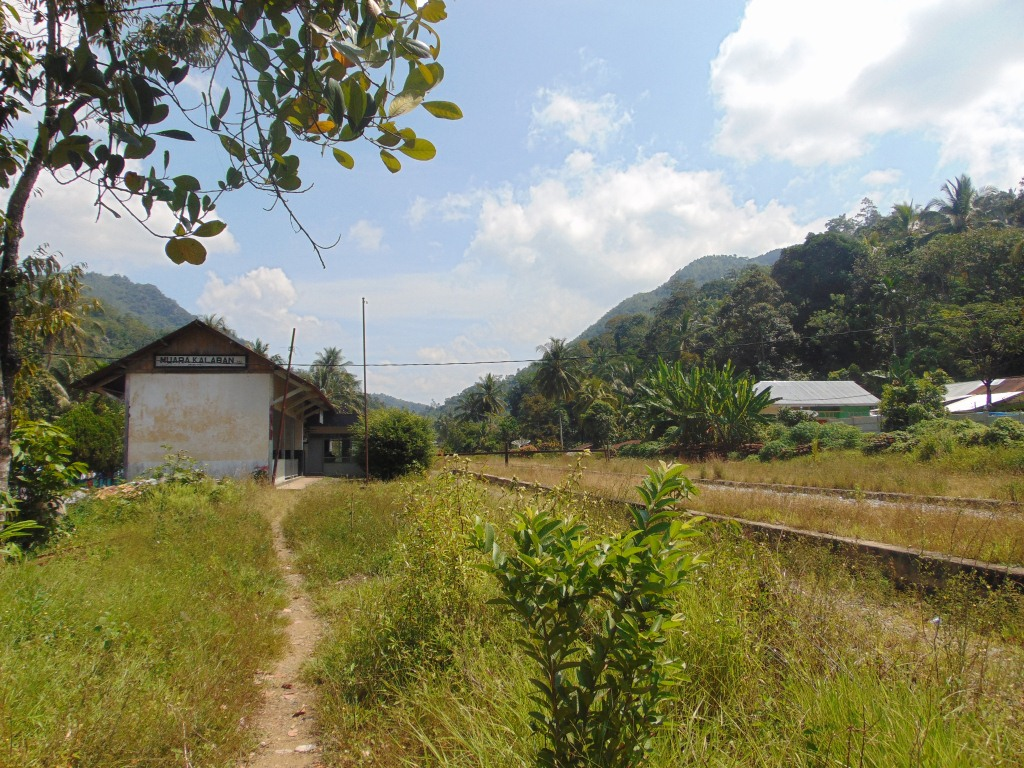
Muarakalaban station (2017)

A railway had been considered as early as 1898. In 1920, W.J.M. Nivel surveyed the route, and published his report in 1922. The plan was originally to connect Muarakalaban in West Sumatra to Tembilahan in Riau. The two initial segments in construction were Muarakalaban–Padang Sibusuk and Padang Sibusuk–Muaro, which was inaugurated on 1 March 1924. The railway segments from Muaro were cancelled in 1930 as not economically viable, and remained unbuilt until World War II.

=== World War II ===
After the Dutch East Indies campaign, the Imperial Japanese Army considered creating a connection between East and West-Sumatra. After the Battle of Midway, the survey by Nivel was rediscovered. The railway would allow troops movements from coast to coast and avoided Allied warships. In March 1943, rōmusha, conscripted labourers, were rounded up. From 19 May 1944 onwards, 6,600 prisoners of war who were mainly Dutch Indo-Europeans, but also included 1,000 British prisoners of war, and a combined 300 prisoners of war from the United States, Australia and New Zealand, were tasked to work on the railway. The prisoners were spread out over 14 camps.

Construction of the railway started on 24 May 1944, and was finished 15 August 1945, the day of the Surrender of Japan. Between 24 and 30 August 1945, the conscripted workers and prisoners of war were transported back to Pekanbaru where they learned about the surrender. By the time the work was completed in August 1945, 703 prisoners of wars had died, and about 20,000 Indonesian romusha had died.

George Duffy, one of the 15 Americans there and survivor of the sinking of the MS American Leader recounted life and death for the POW workers on MemoryArchive: malaria, dysentery, pellagra, and malnutrition/"beri-beri" were the principal maladies compounded by overwork and mistreatment. "The average age at death of the 700 POWs who perished on that railway was 37 years and 3 months."

== Legacy and memorial ==
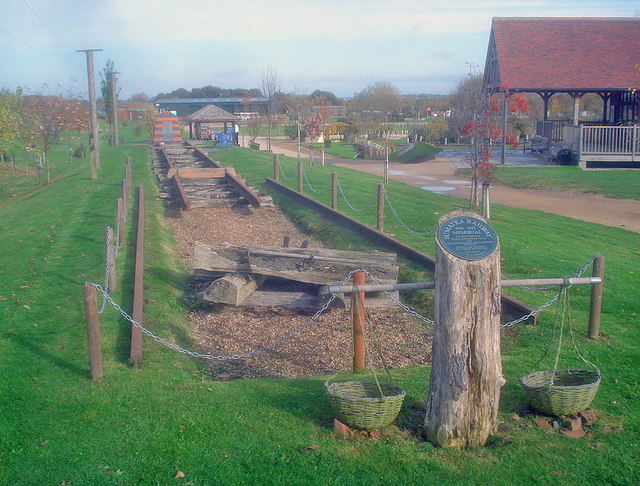
Sumatra Railway Memorial at the National Memorial Arboretum in Alrewas, England

The Muaro–Pekanbaru railway was never fully utilised and remains unused and in an advanced state of decay. The Japanese also directed construction of the Burma Railway and Kra Isthmus Railway (from Chumphon to Kra Buri).

The Sumatra Railway Memorial was unveiled on VJ Day in 2001 at the National Memorial Arboretum in Alrewas, England near Lichfield, Staffordshire. The memorial commemorates the prisoners of war and conscripted labourers who were forced to work on the 220-kilometre (140 mi) Sumatra railway project and is located next to the Far East Prisoners of War Memorial Building. The memorial's unveiling was attended by former prisoners of war, the Japanese ambassador to Britain (Sadayuki Hayashi) and included a peace stone and the planting of flowering trees to symbolise reconciliation.

== See also ==
- August Kop, Dutch Olympic medallist; died 30 April 1945 in Pekanbaru
- Far East prisoners of war
- Strategic railway
- Hellships
