= Setara Institute =

Indonesia-based nongovernmental organization

SETARA Institute
- Type: Research institute Think tank
- Headquarters: Jakarta, Indonesia
- Chairperson: Hendardi
- Website: www.setara-institute.org

SETARA Institute for Democracy and Peace is an Indonesia-based (NGO) that conducts research and advocacy on democracy, political freedom and human rights. SETARA Institute is a young research organization with core research focused on answering the actual needs of society. Its establishment in 2005 was intended as a response to fundamentalism, discrimination and violence on behalf of religion and morality in many fields that threaten pluralism and human rights in Indonesia. SETARA Institute works in secular space (human rights and constitution based law) and does not carry out research penetrating into religious theologies. SETARA Institute is a pioneering defender of freedom of religious belief in Indonesia. It promotes civil freedom and policy change to push for pluralism and human rights.

== Reports ==
SETARA Institute has written several reports on freedom of religion and intolerance/discrimination against religious minorities. This includes a report on the persecution of the Internet Atheist Alexander Aan

In 2011, Setara Institute for Democracy and Peace recorded 244 acts of violence against religious minorities – nearly double the 2007 figure. Indonesian media has also used the institute as a source for criticizing oppression against the Sunni Muslim majority.

== Boards ==
Executive

- Chairperson: Hendardi
- Vice Chairperson: Bonar Tigor Naipospos
- Secretary: R. Dwiyanto Prihartono
- Vice Secretary: Damianus Taufan
- Treasurer: Despen Ompusunggu
- Program Manager: Hilal Safary
- Research Director: Ismail Hasani
- Researcher : Aminudin Syarif
- Internal Manager: Diah Hastuti
- Chief of the Division of Public Participation and Mass Media: Asfin Situmorang

Founders Abdurrahman Wahid, Ade Rostiana, Azyumardi Azra, Bambang Widodo Umar, Bara Hasibuan, Benny K. Harman, Benny Soesetyo, Bonar Tigor Naipospos, Budi Joehanto, Damianus Taufan, Despen Ompusunggu, Hendardi, Ismail Hasani, Kamala Chandrakirana, Luhut MP Pangaribuan, M. Chatib Basri, Muchlis T, Pramono Anung, Rachland Nashidik, Rafendi Djamin, R. Dwiyanto Prihartono, Robertus Robert, Rocky Gerung, Saurip Kadi, Suryadi A. Radjab, Syarif Bastaman, Theodorus W. Koerkeritz, Zumrotin KS

== Programs ==
- Freedom of religious and belief
- Law and human rights
- Minority rights
- Business and human rights
- Constitutional democracy

== See also ==
- Cultural relativism
- Democracy
- Democracy Index
- Human Development Index
- Human rights
- List of freedom indices
- Negative rights
