= Gadis Arivia =

Indonesian feminist philosopher, lecturer, scholar, and activist

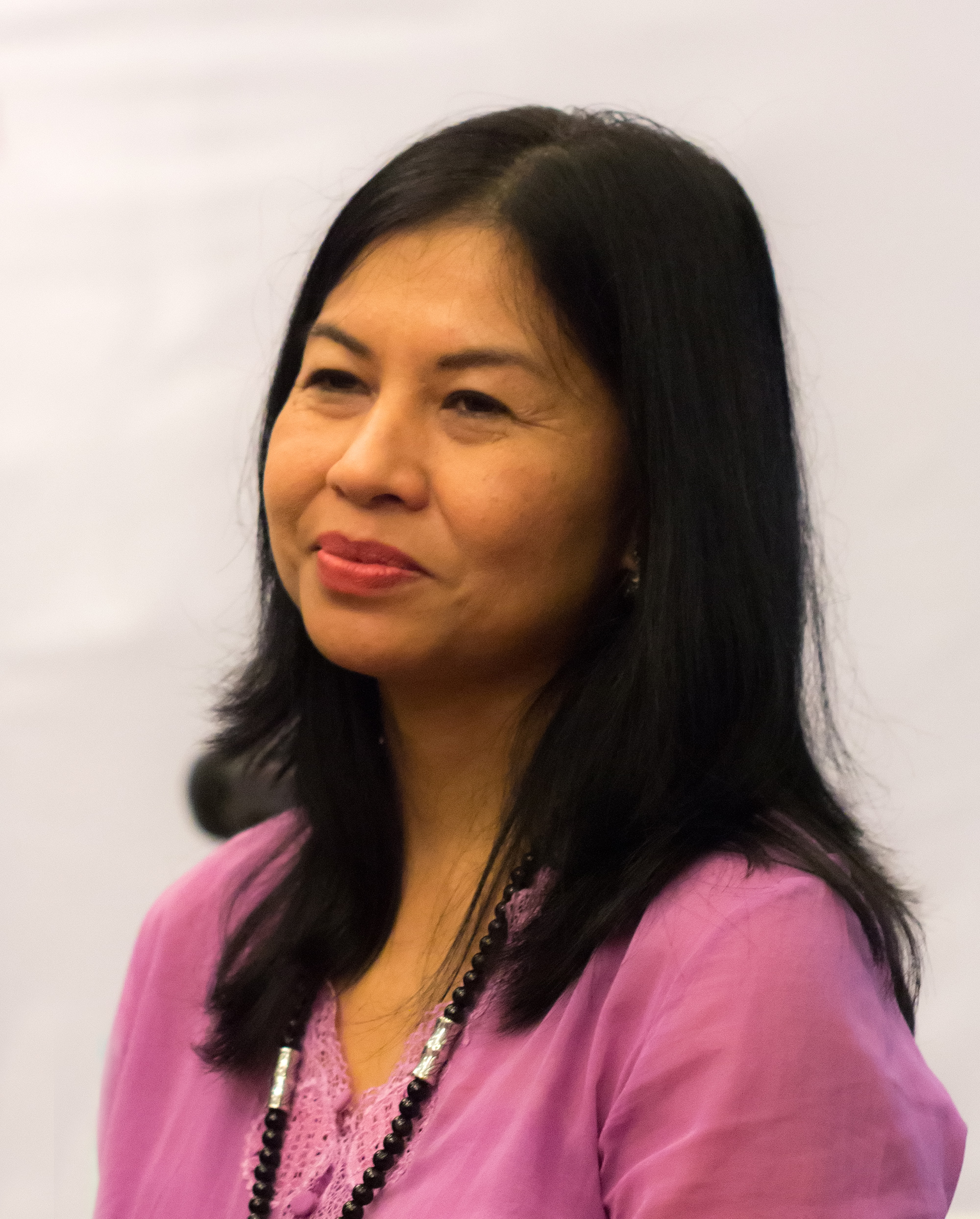
- Arivia in 2016
- Born: 8 September 1964 (age 62); New Delhi, India
- Occupations: Philosopher, activist
- Known for: Establishing Jurnal Perempuan
- Website: www.filsafatgadisarivia.com

Gadis Arivia (Note: Indonesian pronunciation: [ˌɡa.dɪs ˌa.riˈfi.a]) (born 8 September 1964) is an Indonesian feminist philosopher, lecturer, scholar, and activist. While teaching feminism and philosophy at the University of Indonesia, Arivia founded Jurnal Perempuan, Indonesia's first feminist journal, in 1996. She was arrested by Suharto's New Order government for protesting against the regime in 1998.

== Biography ==
Arivia was born in New Delhi, India, in 1964. The daughter of an Indonesian diplomat, she spent most of her childhood abroad; aside from living in India, she also spent time in Ethiopia and Hungary, where she studied at the British Embassy School in Budapest. After some time studying in Indonesia, she completed her senior high school studies at McLean High School in McLean, Virginia, while her brother was stationed in Washington D.C.

After completing her high school studies, Arivia studied the French language in a diploma program at the University of Indonesia, later completing a degree in philosophy at the same university. While completing her baccalaureate studies, Arivia became interested in feminism. She read several works on the subject, including the writings of her lecturer, Toeti Heraty, as well as Barbara Smith's All the Women Are White, All the Blacks Are Men, But Some of Us Are Brave: Black Women's Studies. She began teaching at the University of Indonesia in 1991, and was responsible for the inaugural Feminist Paradigms course before she enrolled at EHESS the School for Advanced Studies in the Social Sciences in 1992. Arivia received her DEA in social psychology two years later.

Upon her return to Indonesia, Arivia resumed teaching. Noting the difficulty of finding feminist materials in Indonesia and hoping to promote democratization efforts and protect minority rights, she began work, supported by Ida Dhanny, Asikin Arif, and Toeti Heraty, to establish the country's first feminist journal. She founded the Jurnal Perempuan Foundation in 1995, and the inaugural Jurnal Perempuan (Women's Journal) was published the following year; Krishna Sen of the University of Western Australia describes it as "Indonesia’s first journal of feminist theory". The journal had limited funds for its publication and later social work, and in the eight years that Arivia served as the journal's director, she did not receive a salary. As of 2016, she remains on the journal's board of editors.

During the Asian Financial Crisis, Arivia – recognized as one of Jakarta's leading feminist scholars – protested against the government using the rising price of milk as a camouflage. On 23 February 1998, she joined some twenty other women at the Hotel Indonesia roundabout to protest high prices in a protest organized by Jurnal Perempuan and established Suara Ibu Peduli ("Voice of Caring Mothers"), an organization coordinated by Arivia. The protesters prayed, sang, distributed flowers, and read a statement that called for greater women's participation in resolving the crisis. Arivia was arrested with two other women, the astronomer Karlina Leksono Supelli and the activist Wilasih Noviana. After receiving extensive public support, the three were released.

In 2002, Arivia completed her doctorate studies at the University of Indonesia's philosophy department. Her dissertation, "Dekonstruksi Filsafat Barat, Menuju Filsafat Berperspektif Feminis" ("Deconstructing Western Philosophy, Moving Towards a Feminist Perspective Philosophy") was published the following year as Filsafat Berperspektif Feminis (Feminist Perspective Philosophy).

In 2009, Arivia published a poetry collection titled Yang Sakral dan yang Sekuler (The Sacred and the Profane). This collection, published a year after the controversial Pornography and Pornoaction law was passed, has been read as a condemnation of the Indonesian state's continued power over women's bodies and sexuality. Arivia in 2006 received the Tasrif Award by Alliance of Independent Journalists (AJI)

Arivia taught contemporary philosophy and feminist theory at the Faculty of Humanities at the University of Indonesia until 2017. In 2018 she joined Montgomery College, Takoma Park, Silver Spring, Maryland as an adjunct professor in sociology and sociology of gender. She is married to Richard Pollard, with whom she has two children, Anisa Joyce Pollard and Benjamin Arif Pollard. She currently lives in Bethesda, Maryland.

== Selected publications ==
- Arivia, Gadis (2003). Filsafat Berperspektif Feminis [Feminist Perspective Philosophy] (in Indonesian). Jakarta: Jurnal Perempuan Foundation. ISBN 9789793520001.
- Arivia, Gadis (2003). Menggalang Perubahan: Perlunya Perspektif Gender dalam Otonomi Daerah [Pushing for Change: The Need for Gender Perspectives in Regional Autonomy] (in Indonesian). Jakarta: Jurnal Perempuan Foundation. ISBN 9789793520001.
- Arivia, Gadis (2006). Feminisme: Sebuah Kata Hati [Feminism: A Word from the Heart] (in Indonesian). Jakarta: Kompas. ISBN 9789797092443.
- Adian, Donny Gahral; Arivia, Gadis (2009). Relations between Religions and Cultures in Southeast Asia. Washington, D.C.: Council for Research in Values and Philosophy. ISBN 9789797092443.

== Works cited ==
- Arivia, Gadis. "Dr. Gadis Arivia, SS, DEA". filsafatgadisarivia.com (in Indonesian). Archived from the original on 1 October 2016.
- Ariyani. "Smart Woman: Dr. Gadis Arivia (38)". CBN (in Indonesian). Cyberindo Aditama. Archived from the original on 1 March 2005.
- "Merefleksikan Makna Gerakan Perempuan" [Reflecting on the Meaning of the Women's Movement]. Kompas (in Indonesian). 17 March 2003. Archived from the original on 27 July 2003.
- "Profil Yayasan Jurnal Perempuan" [Profile of the Jurnal Perempuan Foundation] (PDF). Jurnal Perempuan. Archived from the original (PDF) on 25 March 2016.
- Qimala, Rica Naza. "Gadis Arivia". Merdeka.com (in Indonesian). Archived from the original on 1 October 2016.
- Sen, Krishna (2002). "Gendered Citizens in the New Indonesian Democracy" (PDF). Review of Indonesian and Malaysian Affairs. 36 (1): 51–65.
- "When Mothers Speak, Milk Prices Come Down - And So Does a Government". Mercy Corps. 7 November 2002. Archived from the original on 1 October 2016.
- Wiyatmi (2013). "Yang Sakral dan Yang Sekuler: Menggugat Kuasa Atas Tubuh dan Seksualitas" [The Sacred and the Profane: Challenging Power over Bodies and Sexuality]. Prosiding Seminar Nasional Sastra Bandung, Balai Bahasa Bandung, pada Sastra Daerah Meraih Sastra Dunia [Proceedings of the National Seminar on Literature at the Language Center of Bandung, regarding Regional Literature moving towards Global Literature] (PDF) (in Indonesian).
