= Karlina Leksono Supelli =

Indonesian philosopher and astronomer (born 1958)

Karlina Supelli
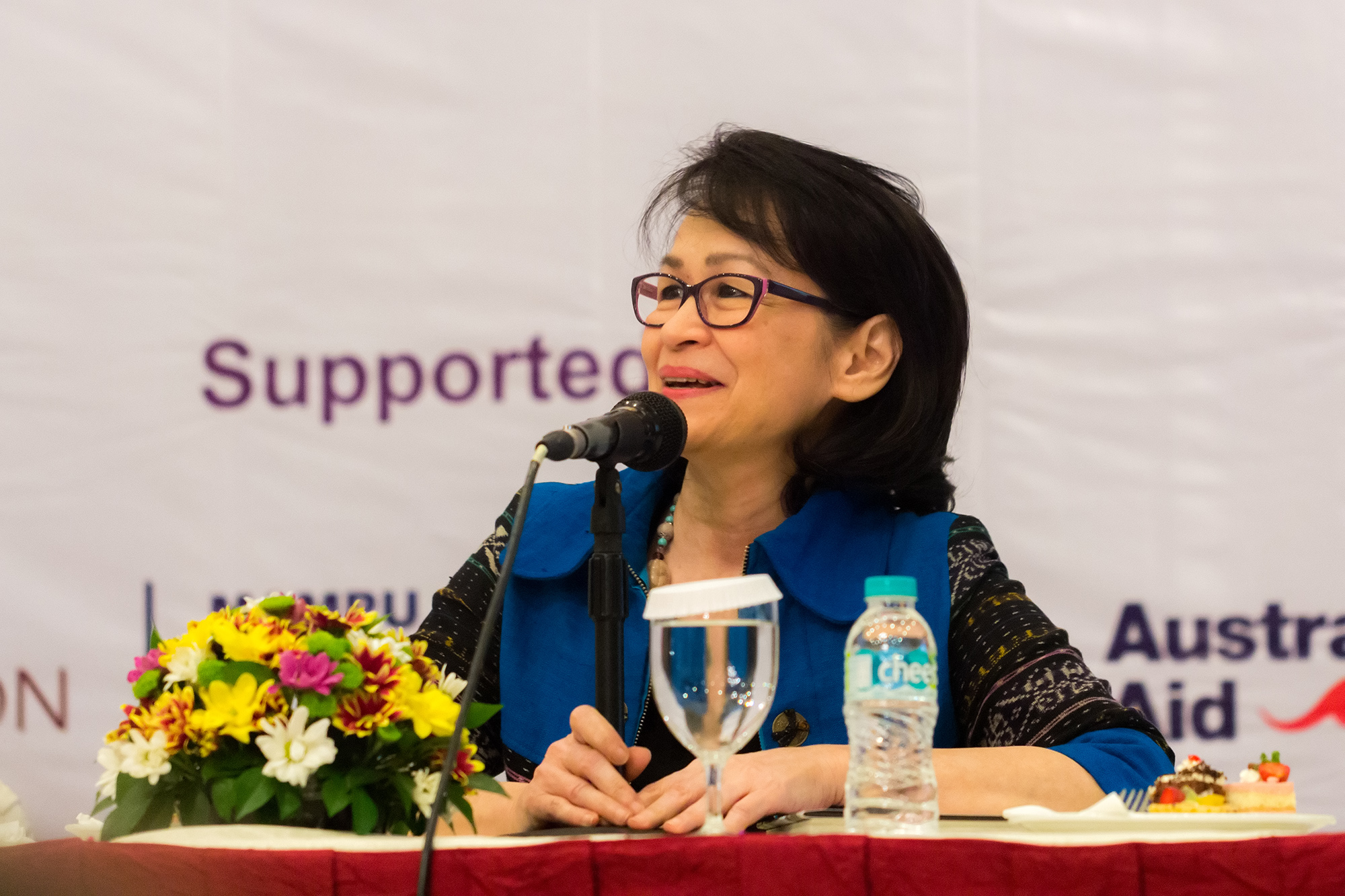
- Karlina Leksono Supelli at the International Conference on Feminism, 24 September 2016
- Born: May 15, 1958 (age 68); Jakarta
- Occupation: Academic

Academic background
- Education: Bandung Institute of Technology; University College London; University of Indonesia

Academic work
- Discipline: Philosophy, Astronomy

Karlina Leksono Supelli (born 15 January 1958 in Jakarta) is an Indonesian philosopher and astronomer. One of Indonesia's first female astronomers, she received her bachelor's degree in Astronomy at ITB and MSc in Space Science from the University College London, and completed her doctorate in Philosophy at Universitas Indonesia in 1997.

She has also been known to participate in humanitarian activities during Indonesia's 1998 Reformation. Under the leadership of Karlina Supelli, in February 1998 a group of concerned mothers held a demonstration in front of the HI (Hotel Indonesia). As a result, she was arrested with two other women, Gadis Arivia and Wilasih Noviana.

A feminist, Karlina also took part in revealing and defending the rights of victims of the Indonesian riots of May 1998, when hundreds of Chinese Indonesian women were raped in Jakarta. She went to the US to persuade the US government to stop their export of weapons into Indonesia, resulting in death threats because of her activities. However, she was not deterred. She was also active in defending the rights of the Acehnese and East Timorese women who have been raped by members of the Indonesian army.

Karlina has lectured philosophy and astronomy in several Indonesian universities. Her writings have been published in journals in both Indonesia and abroad. She is now a lecturer in Sekolah Tinggi Filsafat Driyarkara (Driyarkara High School of Philosophy), Jakarta.
