= Jurnal Perempuan =

- Cover, February 2019
- Discipline: Feminism
- Language: Indonesian
- Edited by: Patricia Beata Kurnia

Publication details
- History: Since 1996
- Publisher: Jurnal Perempuan Foundation (Indonesia)
- Frequency: Quarterly

Standard abbreviations
- ISO 4: J. Peremp.

Indexing
- ISSN: 1410-153X (print); 2541-2191 (web)
- LCCN: 97940078
- OCLC no.: 612763067

Links
- Journal homepage

Jurnal Perempuan (lit. 'Women's Journal'), also published as the Indonesian Feminist Journal, is an academic journal from Indonesia. Established in 1996 by Gadis Arivia, Ida Dhani, Toeti Heraty, and Asikin Arif, it was the first feminist journal in Indonesia. The journal has received financial support from the Ford Foundation, and has published more than a hundred issues, covering topics such as women and religion, sexual violence, health and sexuality, law and human rights, and women in society and politics.

== Establishment ==
Jurnal Perempuan grew out of a bulletin created by Gadis Arivia, a lecturer of feminism and philosophy at the University of Indonesia, for students in her class "Paradigms in Women's Studies". Arivia had developed this bulletin in 1994 after her students complained of the difficulty accessing Indonesian-language materials on feminism. Copies were limited to approximately 200 per issue.

To provide a legal entity for further publication, Arivia partnered with Ida Dhani, Toeti Heraty, and Asikin Arif to establish the Jurnal Perempuan Foundation (Yayasan Jurnal Perempuan). In a 2017 interview, Arivia stated that this also allowed her to express her views more freely, due to a lack of academic freedom at the university. She recalled, "I was constantly criticized for calling myself a feminist and sometimes attacked just for using the term feminism itself." The team were able to secure a publication permit from the New Order regime of President Suharto, which Arivia attributed to the mistaken belief that the journal would focus on cooking, dressmaking, and other "glamour" topics, as the government could not conceptualize a serious feminist journal.

Renamed Jurnal Perempuan, the first edition was published in August 1996, with its cover article focusing on violence against women. Subsequent editions continue to focus on women's issues, taking a popular science approach. The first edition moved fewer than fifty copies, which were mostly distributed without charge. Operations were based out of Arivia's home in Jakarta, and the editorial team were unpaid volunteers. Jurnal Perempuan was the first academic feminist journal in Indonesia.

Distribution was initially difficult, as there was a general lack of interest in gender studies and the publication was deemed unprofitable. When the Gramedia chain of book stores agreed to carry the journal, it was placed in the "Miscellany" or "Cooking" sections. In 2008, Arivia recalled that team members had regularly attended Gramedia stores and placed copies of the journal in more prominent places, and that on several occasions she had posed as a customer and drawn attention to the journal by reading it. In 1997, Jurnal Perempuan hired its first paid staff.

== Growth ==
The Jurnal Perempuan Foundation drew increased attention in 1998 after several members, including Arivia and the astronomer Karlina Leksono Supelli, were arrested during demonstrations. The women had established Suara Ibu Peduli ("Voice of Caring Mothers"), which protested the government's handling of the Asian Financial Crisis at the Hotel Indonesia Roundabout by focusing on the rising price of milk. Amidst coverage of the case, Jurnal Perempuan saw increased public interest, with 5,000 copies sold. By 2007, it was carried by most Indonesian book stores, though circulation had reduced to 2,000 copies. The journal also began receiving financial support through grants from the Ford Foundation, as well as The Asia Foundation.

The Jurnal Perempuan Foundation also implemented several projects outside the journal. Working with Internews Indonesia, it broadcast weekly programmes dealing with on women's issues beginning in 1998. The foundation was incorporated into a non-governmental organization, and beginning in 2000 it made documentary films on subjects such as violence against women, women in conflict areas, and human trafficking. Other projects included workshops, training, and book publications.

== Subsequent history ==
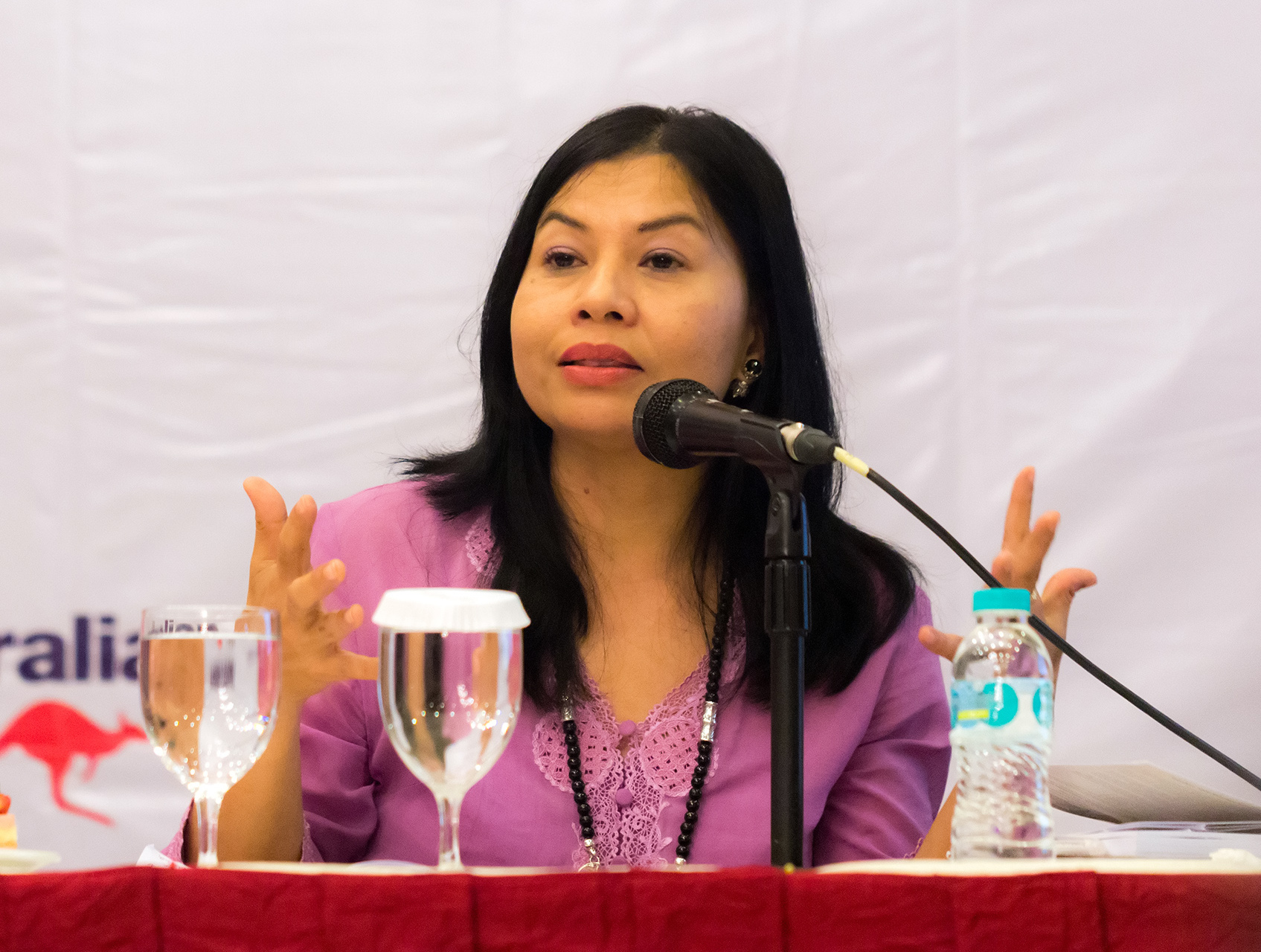
Gadis Arivia speaking at a 2016 Jurnal Perempuan conference

Mariana Amiruddin served as editor-in-chief of Jurnal Perempuan beginning in 2008; she concurrently served as the executive director of the foundation. In 2014, the editor-in-chief role was taken by the activist Dewi Candraningrum, while the executive director position was assumed by Nazmiyah Sayuti. They sought to have the journal accredited by the Ministry of Education and Culture. The role of executive director was taken by the human rights activist Atnike Nova Sigiro in 2017. Under her leadership Jurnal Perempuan published its 100th issue, which described the gains made by Indonesia's women's movements since 1998.

Jurnal Perempuan celebrated its 25th anniversary in 2021, at which time it had published 110 issues, consisting of 610 articles, with major areas of coverage including women and religion, sexual violence, health and sexuality, law and human rights, and women in society and politics. Issues have generally focused on specific themes, such as ecofeminism (issue 80). As of 2026, the editor-in-chief is Patricia Beata Kurnia. The peer-reviewed journal is accredited SINTA 3 by the Ministry of Education for the 2024–2028 period.

== Works cited ==
- Badran, Margot; Arivia, Gadis (January 2017). "Roots and Routes of Secular & Islamic Feminisms in Indonesia". Samyukta: A Journal of Gender and Culture. 2 (1).
- Dewi, Kurniawati Hastuti (2020). "Motherhood Identity in the 2019 Indonesian Presidential Elections". Contemporary Southeast Asia. 42 (2): 224–250. doi:10.1355/cs42-2d. JSTOR 26937801.
- Lukman, Josa (22 April 2019). "Atnike Nova Sigiro: Amplifying Women's Voices". The Jakarta Post. Archived from the original on 21 July 2026.
- Rulistia, Novia D. (15 April 2014). "Nurturing Gender Awareness through Feminist Journal". The Jakarta Post. Archived from the original on 21 July 2026.
- Putri, Retno Daru Dewi G.S.; Manalu, Abby Gina Boang; Subono, Nur Iman (August 2022). "The Feminist Academic Activist: Women's Knowledge for Resistance, Hope and Social Change: Jurnal Perempuan's Contribution to Building Feminist Discourse in Indonesia". Jurnal Perempuan. 27 (2): 103–116. Archived from the original on 21 July 2026.
- Nugroho, Novali Panji (30 March 2025). "Arsip Tempo: Mengenal Suara Ibu Peduli, Gerakan Perempuan Melawan Rezim Soeharto" [Tempo Archives: Introducing Suara Ibu Peduli, the Women's Movement Challenging the Soeharto Regime] (in Indonesian). Archived from the original on 27 July 2026.
- "Merefleksikan Makna Gerakan Perempuan" [Reflecting on the Meaning of the Women's Movement]. Kompas (in Indonesian). 17 March 2003. Archived from the original on 27 July 2003.
- "Profil" [Profile] (in Indonesian). Jurnal Perempuan. Archived from the original on 21 July 2026.
- "Publication Ethics". Jurnal Perempuan. Archived from the original on 22 July 2026.
- Wiyatmi; Suryaman, Maman; Swatikasari, Esti (2019). "Developing an Ecofeminist Literary Criticism Model to Cultivate an Ecologically Aware and Feminist Generation". Interdisciplinary Literary Studies. 21 (4): 515–531. doi:10.5325/intelitestud.21.4.0515.
- "(untitled)" (in Indonesian). Jurnal Perempuan. Archived from the original on 22 July 2026.
- Yuliantri, Rhoma Dwi Aria (2008). "Jurnal Perempuan: Dari Jurnal ke LSM Profesional" [Jurnal Perempuan: From Journal to Professional NGO]. In Setyowati, Hajar Nur (ed.). Seabad Pers Perempuan: Bahasa Ibu, Bahasa Bangsa [A Century of Women's Press: Mother Tongue, National Language] (in Indonesian). Yogyakarta: I:boekoe. pp. 288–292. ISBN 978-979-1436-08-3.
