= Toeti Heraty =

Indonesian poet (1933–2021)

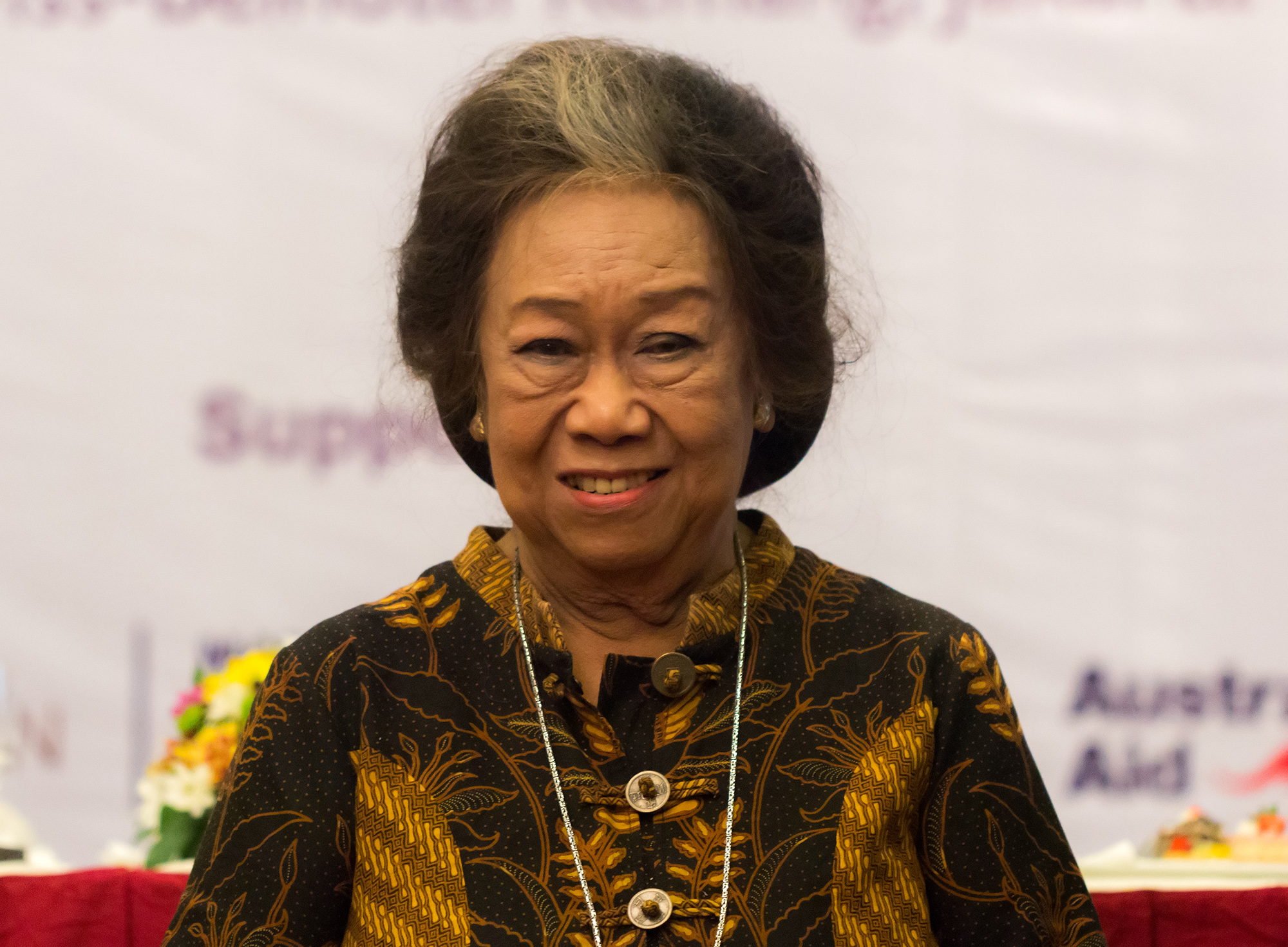
- Heraty in 2016
- Born: 27 November 1933; Bandung, Residency of Preanger, Dutch East Indies
- Died: 13 June 2021 (aged 87); Jakarta, Indonesia
- Citizenship: Indonesia
- Occupation: The Rector of the Jakarta Institute of the Arts
- Spouse: Eddy Noerhadi
- Writing career
- Language: Indonesian
- Genre: Poetry
- Subject: Literature
- Notable works: "Sajak-Sajak 33" (1973), "Nostalgi=Transcendensi" (1995)

Toeti Heraty (also known as Toeti Heraty Noerhadi-Roosseno; 27 November 1933 – 13 June 2021) was an Indonesian poet. She has been singled out as the "only woman amongst the leading contemporary Indonesian poets".

== Biography ==
Toeti Heraty was born in Bandung, Java on 27 November 1933. Her father was a well-known engineering expert Roosseno Soerjohadikoesomo and her siblings all work in the hard sciences. Following her family tradition, she pursued medicine at the University of Indonesia (UI) from 1951 until 1955. Then she took an advanced degree in psychology in 1962 and wrote her thesis on Simone de Beauvoir. At Leiden University, Netherlands she took her degree in Philosophy and produced a dissertation on "The I/Ego in Culture" or "Aku Dalam Budaya". While living in the Netherlands, she met her future husband, the Indonesian biologist Eddy Noerhadi. They married in 1958. Heraty completed her doctorate in philosophy at the University of Indonesia in 1979 with a thesis on "The Self and Culture".

Despite her studies in hard sciences, she found her inclination towards arts and literature. Besides being a poet, she was a philosopher, an art historian and a human rights activist. She first began to write as a college student and since 1966 has been a frequent contributor to Indonesia's leading cultural and literary journals. She has since then occupied herself actively in the academic world. She taught in the Faculty of Psychology at Padjadjaran University. She co-founded (along with Soerjanto Poespowardojo) the Department of Philosophy of the Faculty of Arts at [UI] and served as a lecturer. She also remained the chairperson of both the Department of Philosophy and the post-graduate program for Philosophy Studies. Heraty also served as dean of the Lembaga Pendidikan Kesenian, Jakarta Institute of the Arts, and as acting professor at the Faculty of Arts at UI in 1994.

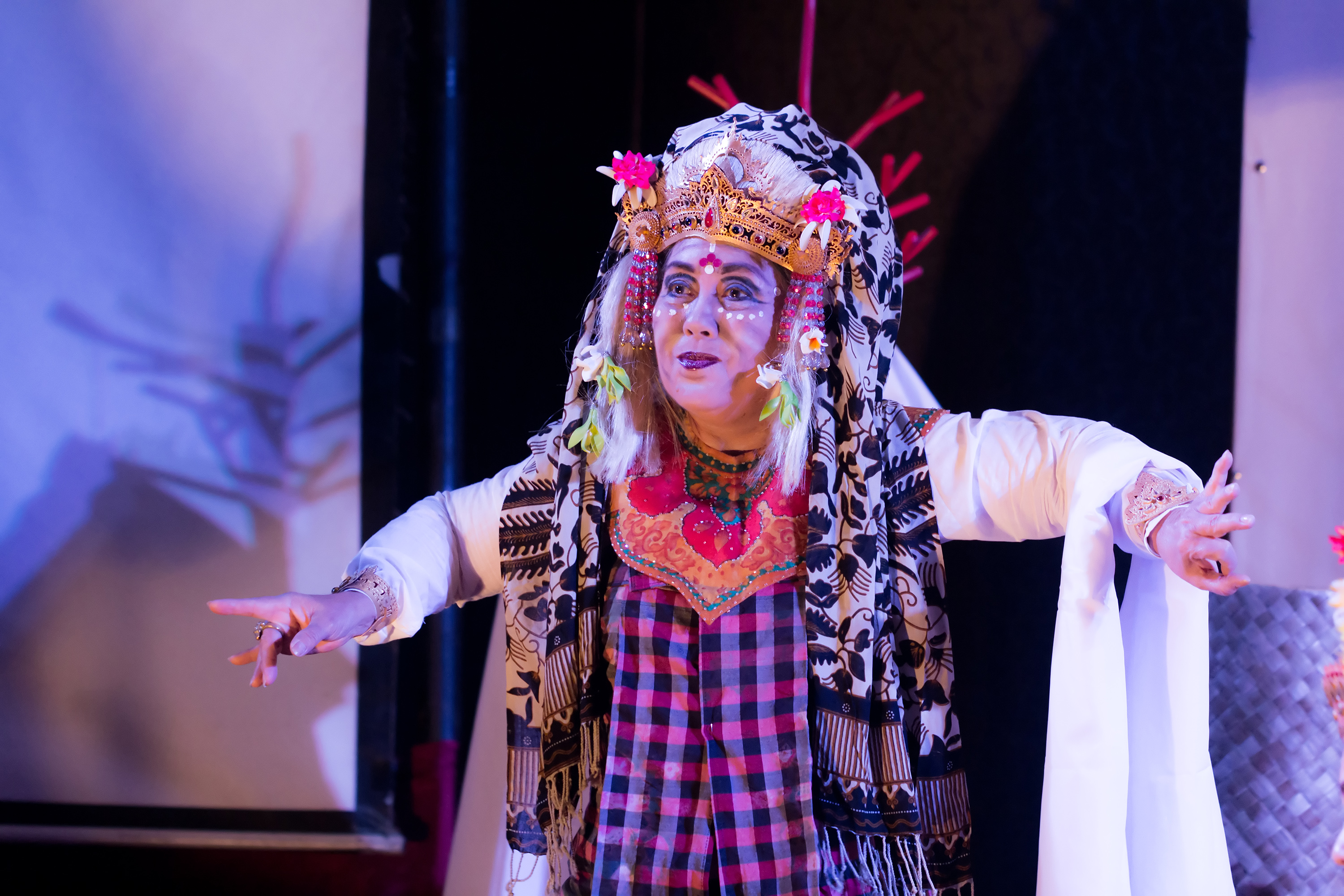
Bulantrisna Djelantik portraying Calon Arang in a Balinese dance drama based on Heraty's version of the story

Toeti Heraty has been singled out as the "only woman amongst the leading contemporary Indonesian poets". Her poetry has been described as difficult to understand, combining a "deliberately cultivated ambiguity" with an "often unexpected, purely associative kind of imagery". But it is possibly her effective use of irony to highlight the unfavorable position of women in a patriarchal society that sets Toeti's poetry apart from that of her peers. She released her first major collection of poems, "Sajak-Sajak 33" (Poems at 33) in 1974, including "Dua Wanita" (Two Women), "Siklus" (Cycle) and "Geneva Bulan Juli" (Geneva in July). She released her second volume of collected poems, "Mimpi dan Pretensi" (Dreams and Pretenses) in 1982. She has also edited a volume of Dutch and Indonesian poetry, and a collection of poetry by women. Her poem, "Calon Arang: the Story of A Woman Victimized by Patriarchy", a book-length lyric, provides critical insights into the standard perception of Indonesia's great archetypal figure, Calon Arang. The poem presents a three-dimensional picture of a woman who stands against the repressive, patriarchal society, but unfortunately is perceived as a legendary witch.

Heraty is considered to belong to the first generation of Indonesian feminist thinkers and has written extensively on issues of importance to women. Heraty's poetry reflects not just her feminist stance, but also her love for art. Her house in Menteng, Jakarta, doubles as a gallery, housing a number of paintings by prominent painters, among them Affandi, S. Sudjojono, and Srihadi Soedarsono. She also headed the Yayasan Mitra Budaya Indonesia, (YMBI, Foundation for Lovers of Indonesian Culture) in 1998. She was a founder of Jurnal Perempuan, a feminist magazine that raises issues concerning women. Heraty also offered her services to a non-government organization, Suara Ibu Peduli, that works for the empowerment of women.

Heraty died on 13 June 2021 at the Metropolitan Medical Center Hospital in Jakarta.

== Publications ==
- Heraty, Toeti (1974). Sajak-sajak 33 (in Indonesian). Jakarta: Budaja Djaja. OCLC 2891785.
- Heraty, Toeti; McGlynn, John H. (1979). Seserpih pinang sepucuk sirih : bunga rampai puisi wanita [A taste of betel and lime : an anthology of poetry by women] (in English and Indonesian). Jakarta: Pustaka Jaya. OCLC 219920699.
- Heraty, Toeti (1981). Poetry International : Toeti Heraty Noerhadi. Jakarta: Rotterdamse Kunststichting. OCLC 66703103.
- Heraty, Toeti (1982). Mimpi & pretensi (in Indonesian). Jakarta: Balai Pustaka. OCLC 10111240.
- Heraty, Toeti (1982). Semalam dengan penyair wanita (in Indonesian). Jakarta: Taman Ismail Marzuki. OCLC 21870176.
- Heraty, Toeti; Marzuki, Yazir (1982). Borobudur. Jakarta: Djambatan. OCLC 10112746.
- Heraty, Toeti; et al. (1983). Kreativitas : kumpulan 12 makalah serta diskusi Simposium Kreativitas yang diadakan oleh Akademi Jakarta dari tanggal 29-31 Oktober 1980 untuk memperingati ulangtahunnya yang ke 10 (in Indonesian). Jakarta: Akademi Jakarta : Dian Rakyat. OCLC 10760861.
- Heraty, Toeti; et al. (1983). Women's self concept : facts and fears in transition (in Indonesian). Yogyakarta: The fourth Indonesian-Dutch History Conference Publication. OCLC 24883623.
- Heraty, Toeti (1984). Aku dalam budaya : suatu telaah filsafat mengenai hubungan subyek-obyek (in Indonesian and Dutch). Jakarta: Pustaka Jaya. OCLC 12667941.
- Heraty, Toeti; Teeuw, A. (1986). Manifestasi puisi Indonesia-Belanda / Indonesia-Nederland poezie manifestatie/ samenstelling (in Indonesian and Dutch). Jakarta: Penerbit Sinar Harapan. OCLC 20751882.
- Heraty, Toeti (1990). Dinamika wanita Indonesia (in Indonesian). Jakarta: Pusat Pengembangan Sumberdaya Wanita. OCLC 27430424.
- Heraty, Toeti (1995). Nostalgi, transendensi : pilihan sajak (in Indonesian). Jakarta: Gramedia Widiasarana Indonesia. ISBN 978-979-553-483-9. OCLC 33443849.
- Heraty, Toeti (2000). Calon arang : kisah perempuan korban patriarki : prosa lirik (in Indonesian). Jakarta: Yayasan Obor Indonesia. ISBN 978-979-461-363-4. OCLC 4734865.
- Heraty, Toeti (2000). Hidup matinya sang pengarang (in Indonesian). Jakarta: Yayasan Obor Indonesia. ISBN 978-979-461-362-7. OCLC 52604148.
- Heraty, Toeti; McGlynn, John (2003). A Time, A Season: Selected Poems of Toeti Heraty (in Indonesian and English). Jakarta: Lontar Foundation. ISBN 978-979-8083-51-8. OCLC 54530299.
- Heraty, Toeti; Rosa Herliany, Dorothea (2003). Pencarian belum selesai : fragmen otobiografi Toeti Heraty (in Indonesian). Magelang: IndonesiaTera. ISBN 978-979-9375-42-1. OCLC 54821860. . .
- Heraty, Toeti (2003). Pawai kehidupan : 70 tahun Toeti Heraty : sumbangan tulisan dari sahabat, kawan, rekan tercinta dan terhormat (in Indonesian, Dutch, and English). Jakarta: Yayasan Mitra Budaya Indonesia. ISBN 978-979-9563-16-3. OCLC 55286435.
- Heraty, Toeti (2006). Calon Arang : the story of a woman sacrificed to patriarchy : lyrical prose. Jakarta: Sanur: Saritaksu Editions. ISBN 978-979-9697-59-2. OCLC 105364367.
- Heraty, Toeti; et al. (2008). Warna-warni (in Indonesian). Depok, Jakarta: Filsafat UI Press, Departemen Filsafat, Fakultas Ilmu Pengetahuan Budaya, Universitas Indonesia. ISBN 978-979-97298-5-9. OCLC 317778502.
- Heraty, Toeti; Aveling, Harry (2008). Rainbow : 18 Indonesian women poets. Yogyakarta: Tera. ISBN 978-978-77506-6-7. OCLC 298707230.
- Heraty, Toeti (2008). Puisi [Poems]. London: Enitharmon. ISBN 978-1-904634-79-9. OCLC 603872004.
- Heraty, Toeti (2009). Akademi Jakarta mengenang 100 tahun Sutan Syahrir : pasang surut idealisme : kajian "Renungan Indonesia" Sutan Syahrir (in Indonesian). Jakarta: Galeri Cipta II Taman Ismail Marzuki. OCLC 433975903.
- Heraty, Toeti (2010). Rainha Boki Raja : ratu Ternate abad keenambelas (in English and Indonesian). Depok, Indonesia: Komunitas Bambu. ISBN 978-979-3731-85-8. OCLC 677976885.
