= Indonesian Atheists =

Indonesian community of atheists

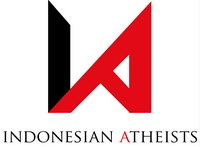
- Abbreviation: IA
- Formation: October 2008
- Location: Indonesia

Indonesian Atheists (IA) is a community that accommodates atheists, agnostics, and irreligious in Indonesia. The community provides a place for Indonesian nonbelievers to express their opinions. IA was founded by Karl Karnadi in October 2008.

Although most of the activities of IA are still limited on the Internet, several public gatherings have been held in Jakarta and other cities. Members are gathered through social networks such Facebook and Twitter.

IA is also an associate member of Atheist Alliance International.
