= Crash Boom Bang (band) =

American pop rock band

- Origin: Fairfax, Virginia, U.S.
- Genres: Pop rock
- Years active: 1999–present
- Members: Omar Ruiz; Chaucer Hwang; Raul Rivero; Mauricio Rivero

Crash Boom Bang is an American pop rock band based in Northern Virginia. Band members include Omar Ruiz, Chaucer Hwang, and brothers Mauricio and Raul Rivero. They have appeared in productions and publications such as Alternative Press and MTV's The City.

Crash Boom Bang have been fans of a wide variety of artists, including Guns N' Roses, Maroon 5 and Lady Gaga. They describe their music as "if Bruno Mars fronted Cobra Starship". They have also been compared to Plain White T's, Boys Night Out and The Red Jumpsuit Apparatus.

== History ==
The name Crash Boom Bang originates from a "tentative lyric in one of [their] songs" which lead singer Omar Ruiz suggested for the band's name. In the band's eyes, the name was fitting because they "wanted something memorable that could describe [their] music at the same time".

Raul Rivero, bass guitarist, and Mauricio Rivero, drummer, are brothers. They attended J.E.B. Stuart High School in Falls Church, Virginia. Chaucer Hwang is originally from Florida. The lead singer, Omar Ruiz, attended McLean High School.

Crash Boom Bang are friends with the popular band, Plain White T's. Mauricio Rivero has known the lead singer, Tom Higgenson, since before Plain White T's achieved widespread fame. Higgenson invited the band to appear for a few shows on the Plain White T's Every Second Counts Tour in 2007. Crash Boom Bang shared a stage with Plain White T's in 2008 and 2009, as well as Mayday Parade. While performing and touring with Plain White T's, Higgenson produced Crash Boom Bang's first full-length album, Gold Rush. Crash Boom Bang is currently not signed to a record label.

== Members ==
- Omar Ruiz – lead vocals, guitar
- Chaucer Hwang – lead guitar
- Raul Rivero – bass guitar, keyboard, backing vocals
- Mauricio Rivero – drums, vocals

== Awards ==
WUSA 9 selected Crash Boom Bang to be in its Best Local Bands A-List in 2006.

In 2008, Crash Boom Bang appeared again in W*USA 9’s list, which showcases over a thousand of Washington DC's "best local businesses" who are nominated by readers, and then voted for online.

== Discography ==
=== Albums ===
Gold Rush
Released February 7, 2009

1. "Are You Ready?" – 3:03
2. "House" – 3:07
3. "Let It Out" – 2:49
4. "Dangerous" – 3:03
5. "Science Fiction" – 3:25
6. "It's Only Me" – 3:24
7. "Let Me Know" – 2:31
8. "Devil In Disguise" – 2:42
9. "Forever In Love" – 2:58
10. "U & I" – 3:07
11. "Thank You" – 2:54

=== EPs ===
Dangerous

1. "Are You Ready?" – 3:11
2. "Dangerous" – 3:08
3. "Let It Out" – 2:54
4. "House" – 3:20
5. "Devil In Disguise" – 3:05
6. "Anniversary" – 3:22

Surrender
Released November 21, 2009

1. "Surrender" – 2:36
2. "Walk Down That Road" – 3:02
3. "Good To Go" – 2:40
4. "Spoke Too Soon" – 2:40

These Wild Things
Released October 3, 2011

1. "Control" – 4:17
2. "Hits" – 3:19
3. "Yelling & Screaming" – 3:31
4. "V.I.P." – 3:27
5. "Hands Up" – 3:25
6. "Save Me" – 2:51

== In other media ==
- The band's song "Are You Ready?" was used in the film American Pie Presents: The Book of Love.
- The band made a guest appearance on the TV show House of Carters in episode 4, "Two of a Carter".
- They were featured in the June 2009 issue of Alternative Press, in "Our Unsigned Bands of the Month".
- On the October 27, 2009, episode 118 of the MTV show The City, "Are You Ready?" was played as some of the stars met to work out the details of an event at Longchamp.

== Solo project ==
Ruiz released an EP titled, Ep under the name Crash Boom Omar on August 24, 2010. The tracks are "What You Really Need Is A Man That Will Sing For You", "Ready For Tomorrow", "Goodbyes" and "Magical".
