= Muaro Sijunjung =

- nagari, capital of regency
- Coordinates: 0°40′13″S 100°57′32″E
- Country: Indonesia
- Subdivision: Sijunjung

Area
  - Total: 5,936 km^{2} (2,292 sq mi)

Muaro Sijunjung is a town and district in Sijunjung Regency, of West Sumatra province of Indonesia and it is the seat (capital) of Sijunjung Regency.
