= List of neighborhoods in Arlington County, Virginia =

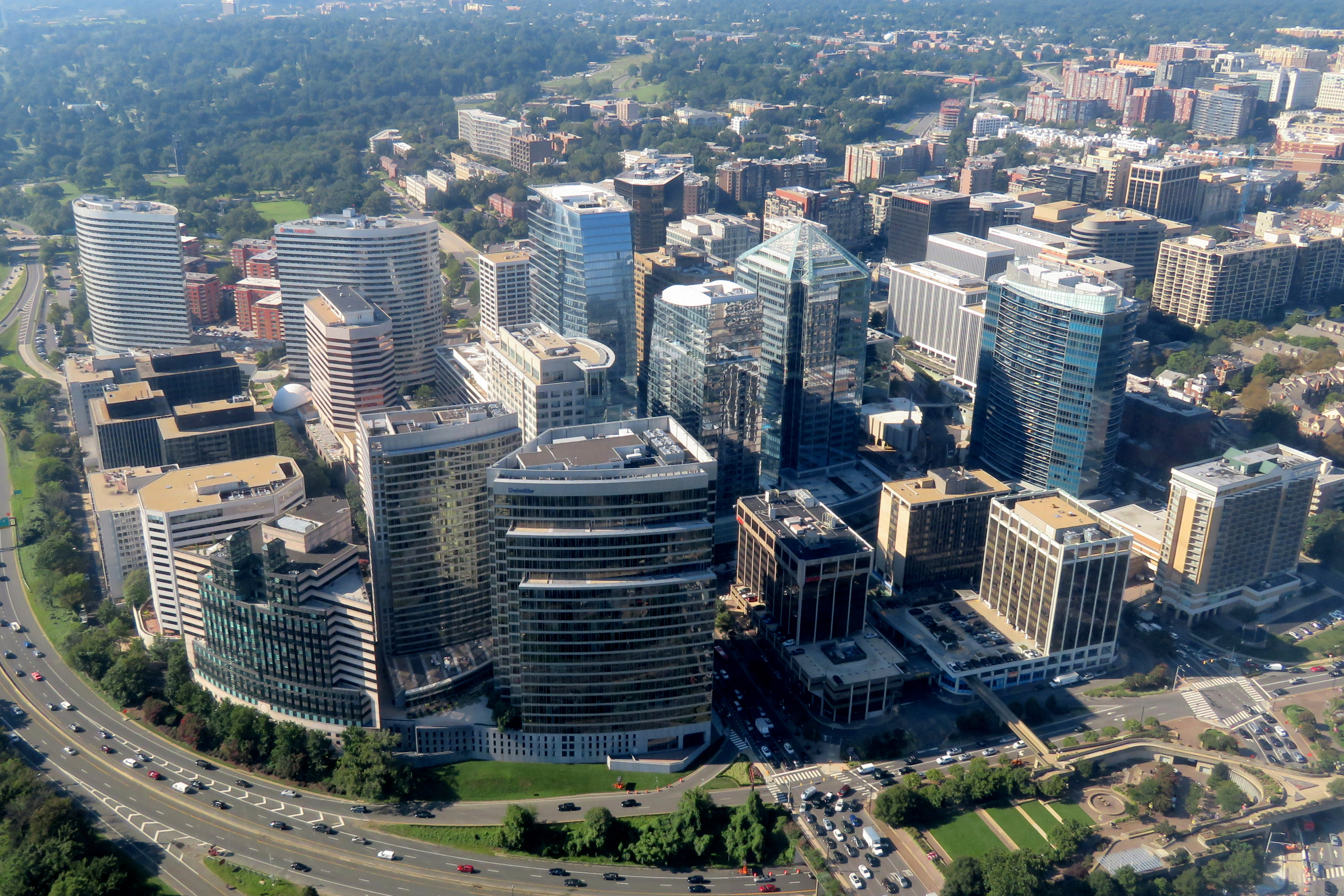
An aerial view of Rosslyn in Arlington County

This is a list of neighborhoods in Arlington County, Virginia. Under Virginia law, towns may be incorporated within counties; however, the state does not permit the creation of any new incorporated towns within a county that has a population density greater than 1,000 persons per square mile. As such, Arlington has no incorporated towns within its borders, but a number of neighborhoods within Arlington are commonly referred to by name as if they were distinct towns.

== Neighborhoods ==
- Alcova Heights
- Arlington Forest
- Arlington Heights
- Arlington Ridge
- Arlington View
- Ashton Heights
- Aurora Highlands
- Aurora Hills
- Ballston and Virginia Square
- Barcroft
- Bellevue Forest
- Bluemont
- Bon Air
- Boulevard Manor
- Brandon Village
- Broyhill Heights
- Buckingham
- Carlin Springs
- Cherrydale
- Claremont
- Clarendon
- Columbia Forest
- Columbia Heights
- Country Club Hills
- Courthouse
- Crescent Hills
- Crystal City
- Crystal Gateway
- Dominion Hills
- Donaldson Run
- Douglas Park
- East Falls Church
- Fairlington
- Forest Glen
- Forest Hills
- Fort Myer Heights
- Glencarlyn
- Garden City
- Gates of Ballston
- Greenbrier
- High View Park / Halls Hill
- Jackson Court
- Lacey Forest
- Lauderdale
- Lee Heights
- Lyon Park
- Madison Manor
- Maywood
- New Dover
- Nauck (Green Valley A.K.A. The Valley)
- Old Glebe
- Overlee Knolls
- Palisades
- Pentagon City
- Penrose
- Prospect House
- Radnor
- Randolph Square
- Rivercrest
- Rosslyn
- Shirlington
- Station Square
- Tara
- Waycroft-Woodlawn (formerly Woodlawn Park)
- Waverly Hills
- Westmont
- Westover
- Willet Heights
- Williamsburg
- Williamsburg Circle
- Williamsburg Village
- Yorktown

== Gallery ==
High density cores of Arlington

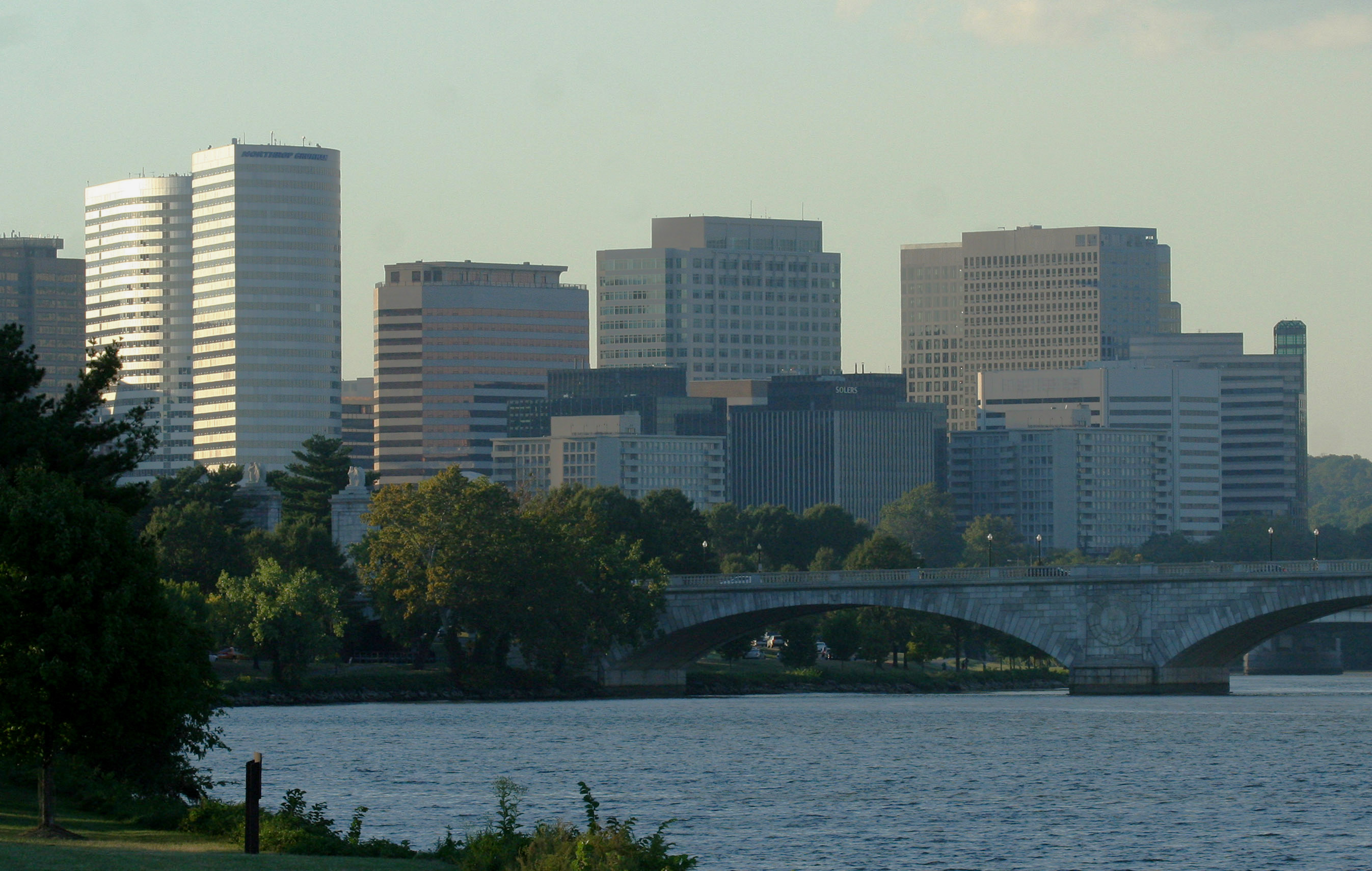
Rosslyn

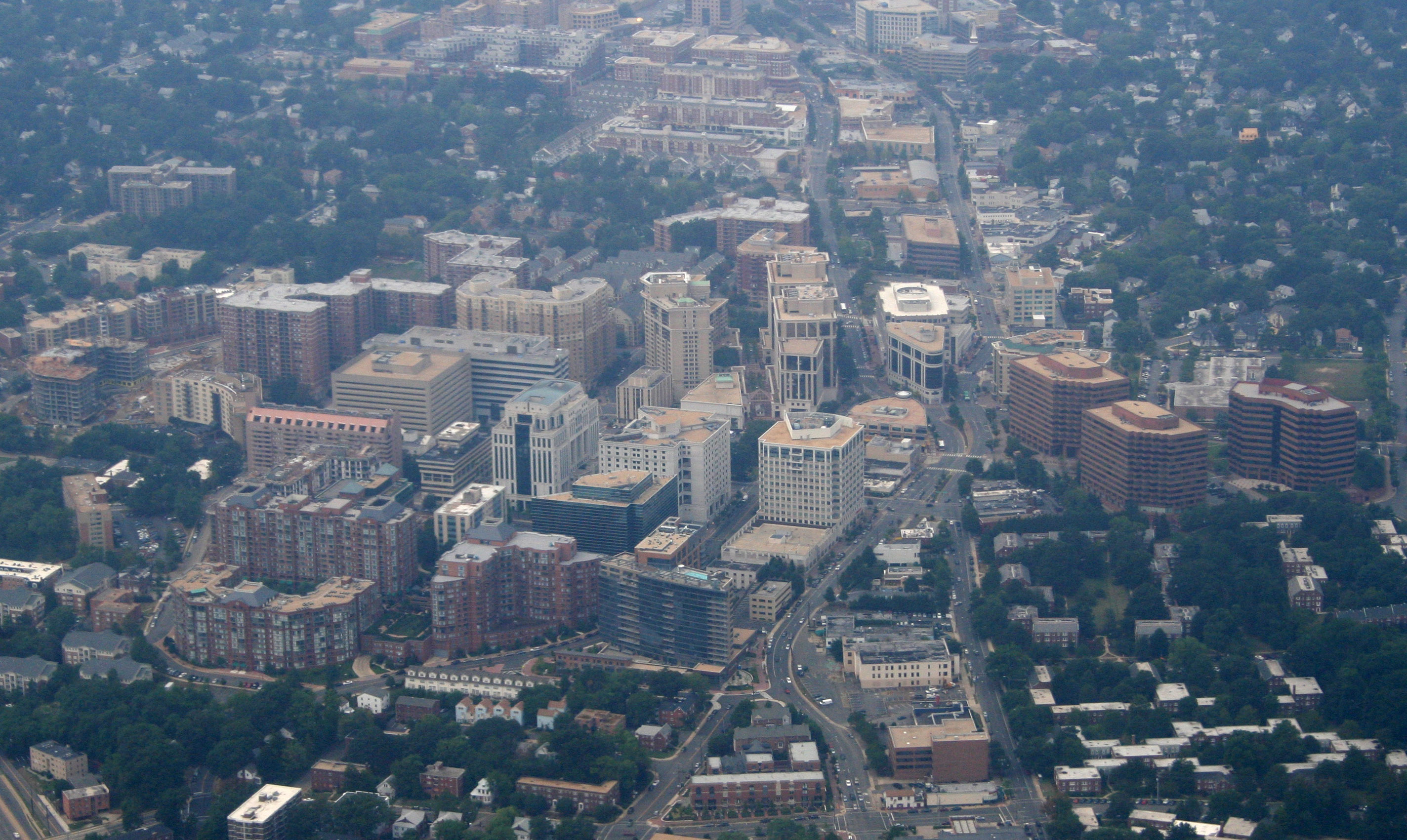
Courthouse

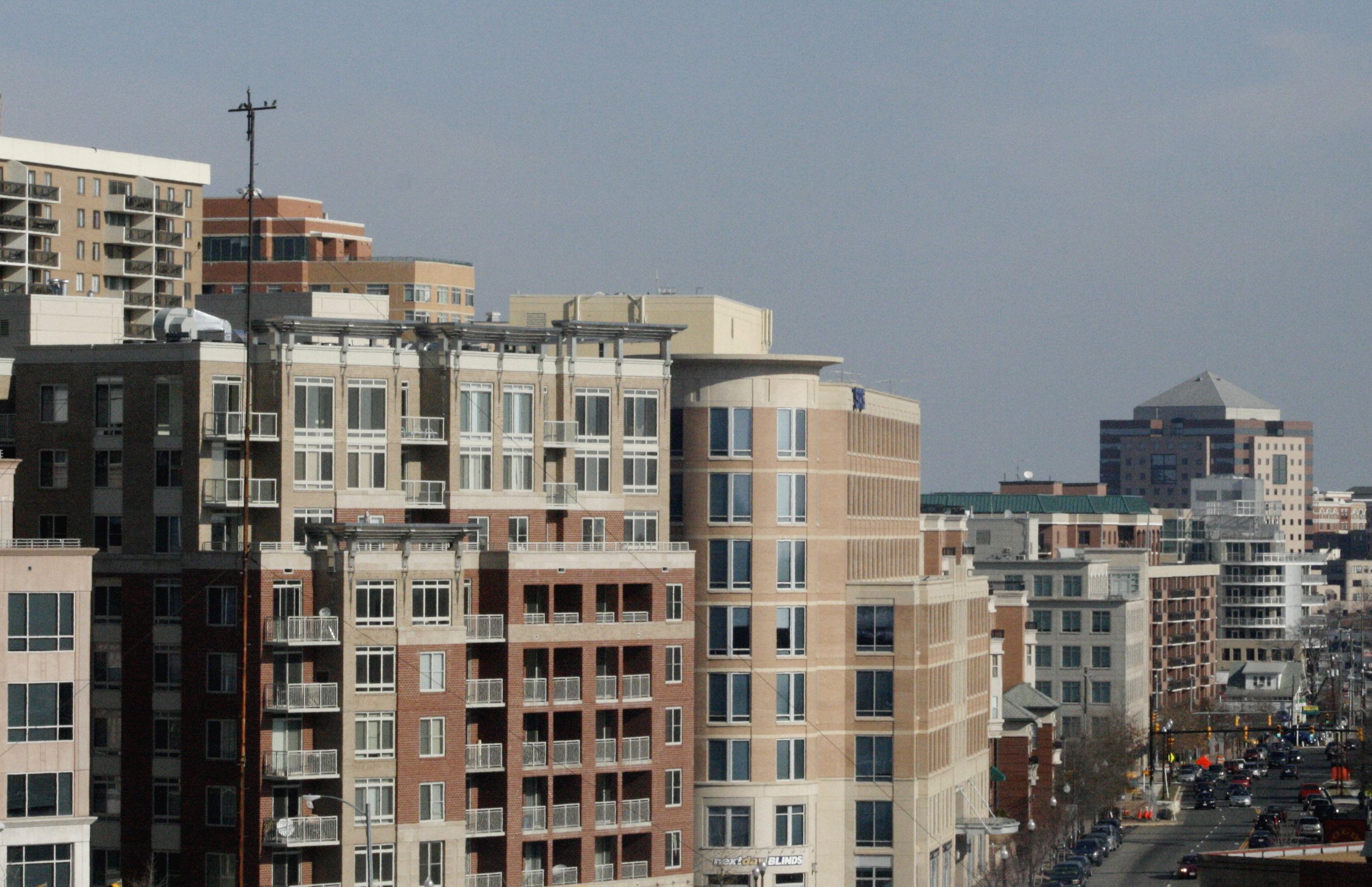
Ballston

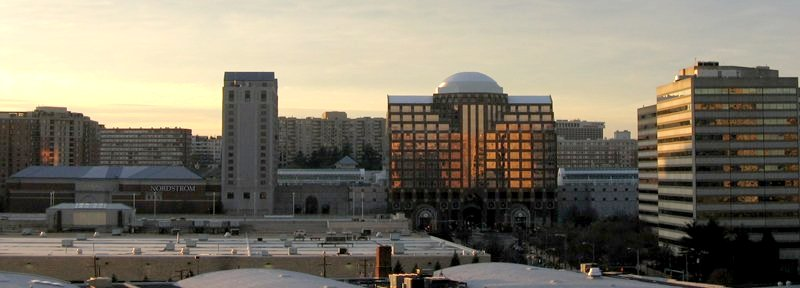
Pentagon City

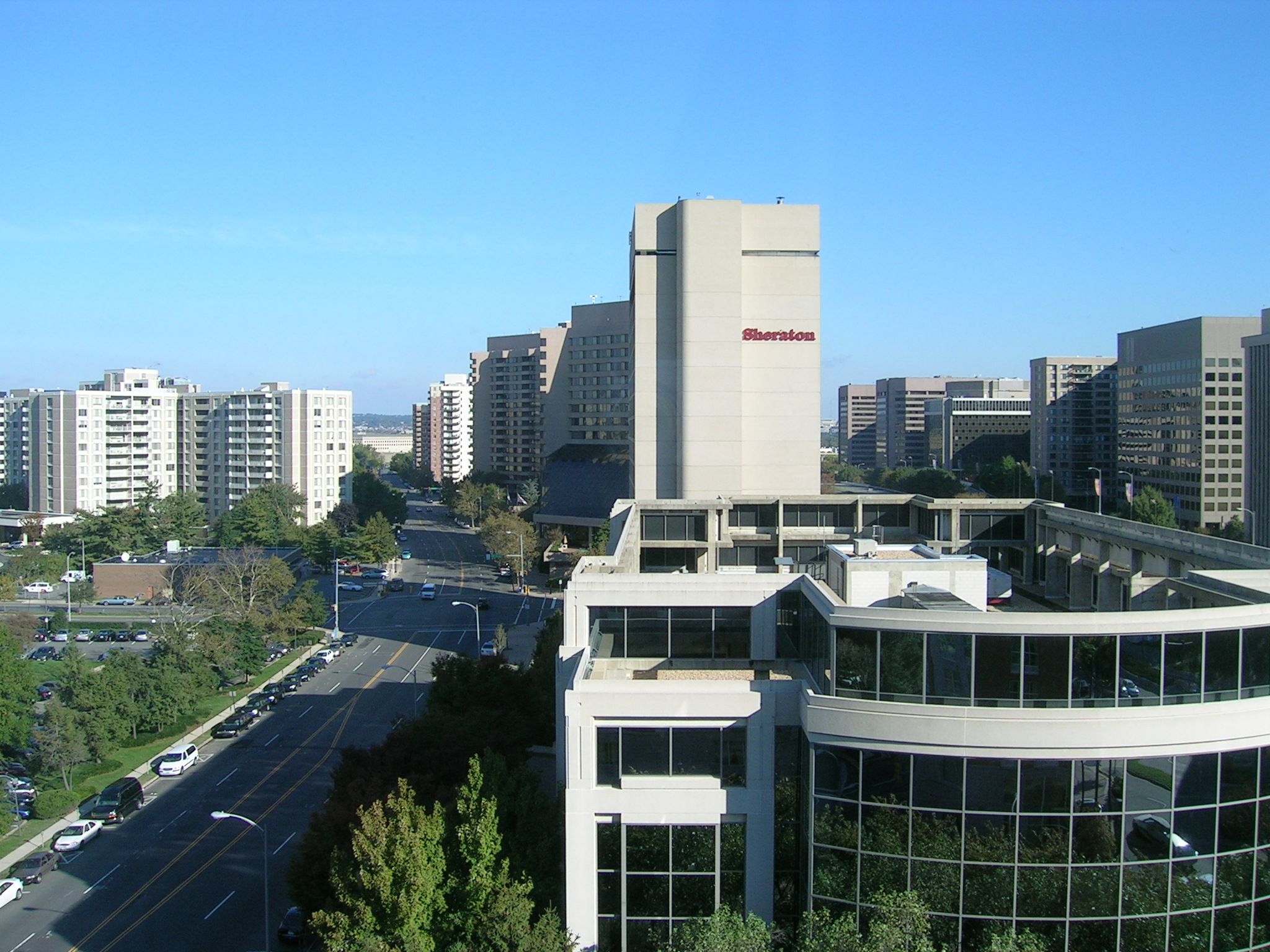
Crystal City
