= Freedman's Village =

Former freedman's community established in 1863

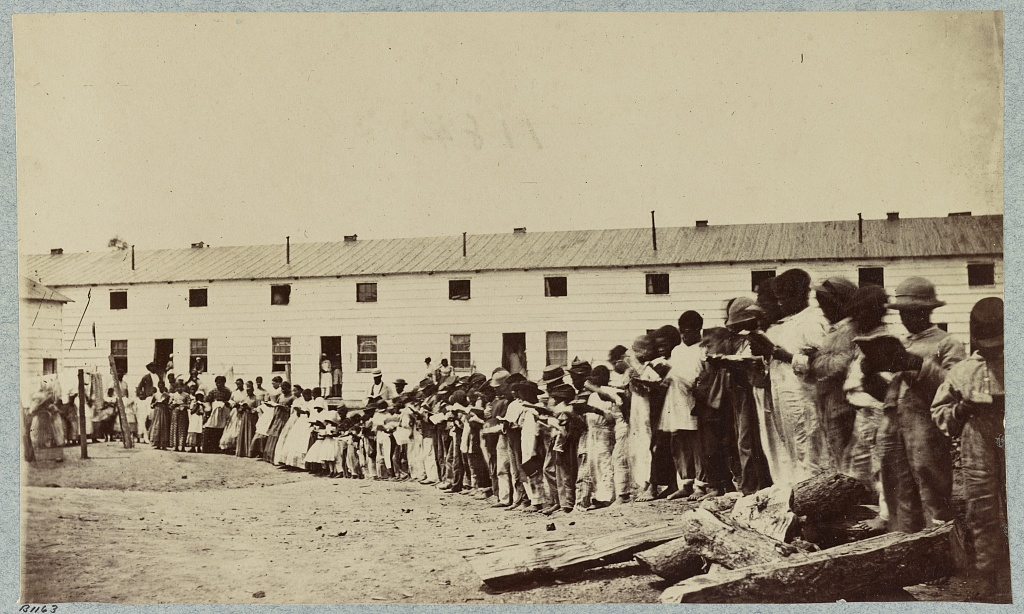
Photograph of children reading books at Freedman's Village, ca. 1864-1865

Freedman's Village was a contraband camp for recently emancipated enslaved people established by the U.S. Army on December 4, 1863 during the Civil War. Situated on land that was originally part of Robert E. Lee's Arlington plantation, Freedman's Village consisted of about 50 duplex houses, a school, a chapel, a hospital, workshops, and a home for the indigent. Officials intended for the village to be a model community for African Americans transitioning out of enslavement, and engaged with charitable societies to educate and train Village residents.

Administration of Freedman's Village transferred from the U.S. Department of War to the Freedmen's Bureau after the war's end; the Bureau imposed stricter regulations and oversight of Village residents, which elicited pushback from the community. In 1868, residents successfully thwarted an attempt by the government to close Freedman's Village, after which they were permitted to purchase their property and rent larger lots. Freedman's Village continued to develop during the Reconstruction Era, and by 1888, the community had grown to 170 households and featured shops, a brick church, and a variety of social organizations. It also became a center of black political power and influence in Alexandria County during this period, and several members of the community were elected to municipal and state offices.

Federal support for Freedman's Village declined as Reconstruction faltered in the 1870s, and government agencies, Alexandria County's white political leaders, and land developers sought to remove the Village. This culminated in the government once again pursuing the closure of Freedman's Village in the 1880s after receiving complaints about the Villagers from staff at Fort Myer and Arlington National Cemetery. John B. Syphax, a black politician and member of the Freedman Village community, negotiated with the government to secure compensation for residents, which combined with contraband tax reimbursements issued by Congress amounted to a total of $75,000. Villagers were then evicted throughout the 1880s and 1890s; many established new black settlements in the area or resettled in Alexandria County's existing black enclaves. Former residents brought with them organizations and institutions they established in Freedman's Village, forming the social fabric of Arlington's African American community.

== History ==
=== Background ===
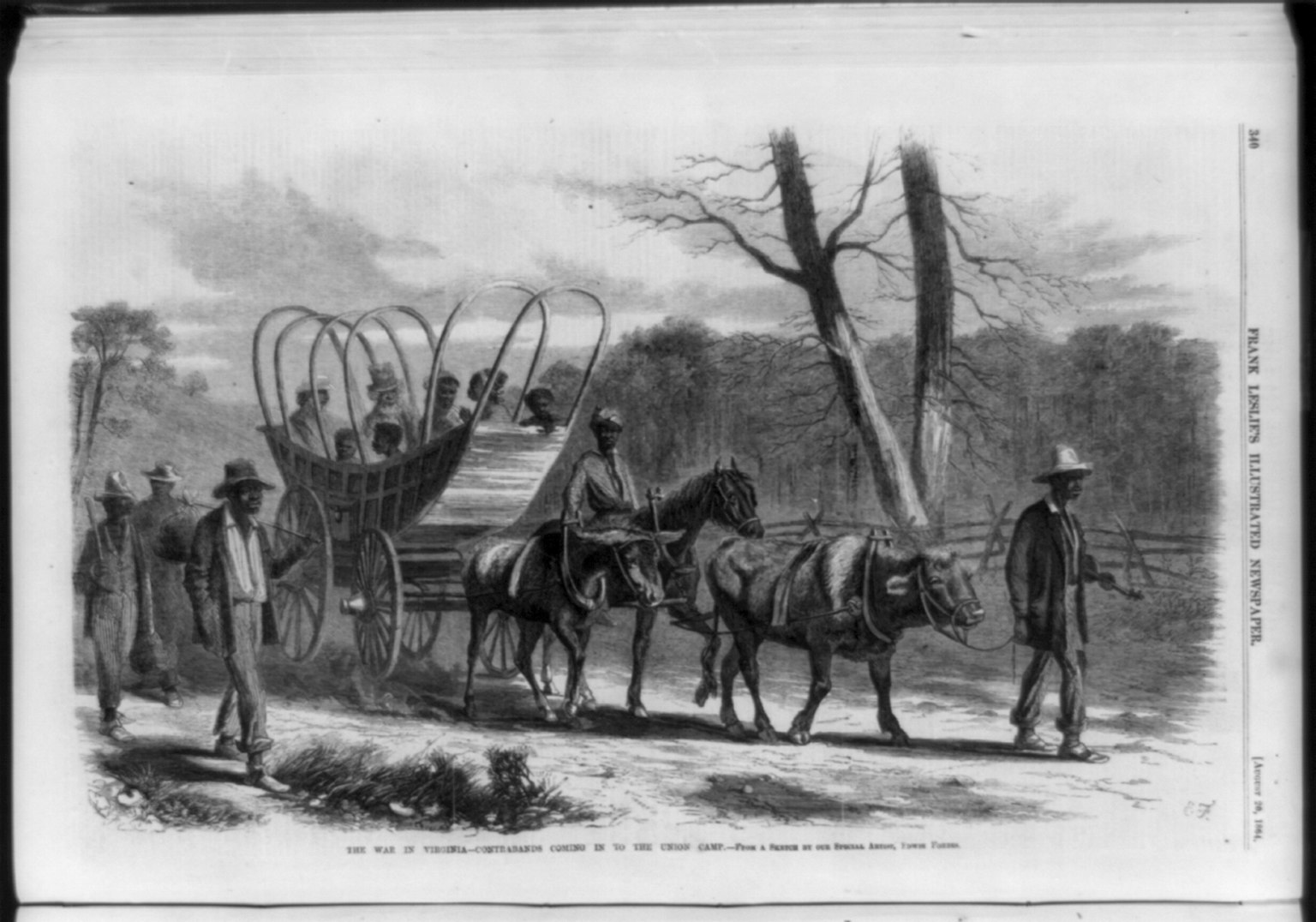
Contraband arriving at a Union camp in Virginia, Frank Leslie's Illustrated Newspaper, 1864

Throughout the Civil War, and particularly after the issuance of the Emancipation Proclamation on June 1, 1863, many enslaved African Americans escaped their bondage by crossing into Union territory. Washington, D.C. directly bordered the Confederacy and was therefore one of the primary destinations for these escapees. These people, termed "contraband" by the U.S. government, first began migrating to Washington in large numbers following the signing of the Compensation Emancipation Act, which freed the city's enslaved population, into law on April 16, 1862. The U.S. Department of War employed Washington's growing contraband population as laborers and teamsters, whose wages beginning in February 1863 were subject to a "contraband tax" to support indigent freedmen.

Contraband camps were established around the city to address their housing needs, and by the middle of the war blacks comprised over 30% of Washington's total population, up from 19% in 1860; many had few possessions and were in poor health. Continued migration of the enslaved into Washington, overcrowding in the contraband camps, and a smallpox outbreak among contraband in 1862 motivated Colonel Elias M. Greene of the Department of Washington to build a camp in Alexandria County.

=== Establishment and early years ===
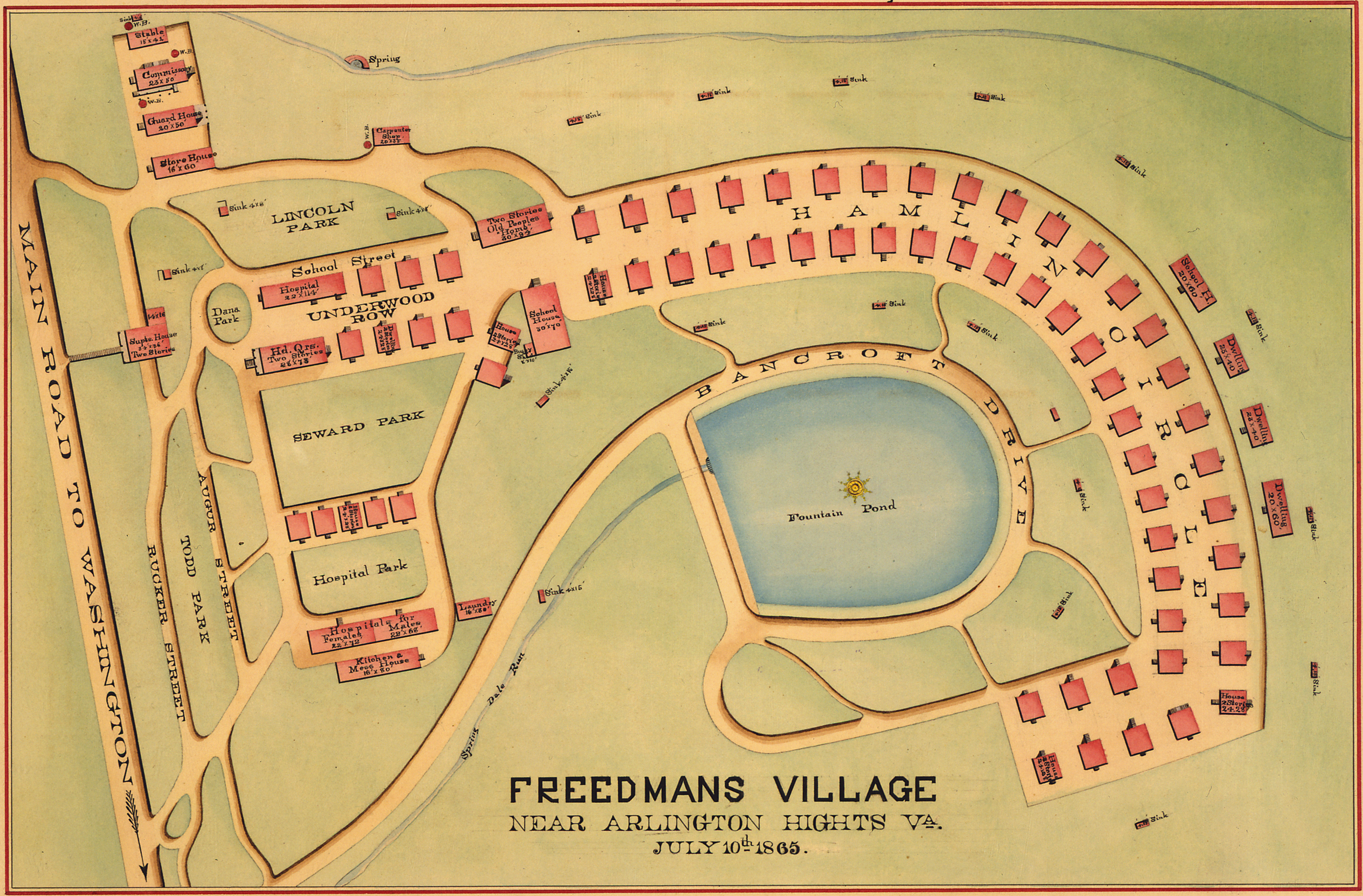
Map of Freedman's Village from July 10, 1865

Greene and Dr. Danforth B. Nichols, a member of the abolitionist Protestant American Missionary Association that had been placed in charge of all contraband by Washington military governor James S. Wadsworth since June 1862, selected a site for the camp on May 5, 1863 in Robert E. Lee's former Arlington plantation, which had been seized in 1862 by the federal government. Greene envisioned the new settlement as an improved environment for Washington's contraband compared to the city's cramped camps where those of working age could be gainfully employed for the benefit of themselves and the government. The location was also chosen for the symbolism associated with a freedman's settlement on Lee's former estate.

General Samuel P. Heintzelman and Acting Quartermaster Charles Thomas approved Greene's plan, and the camp was formally opened on December 4, 1863 in a ceremony attended by Congressmen, members of the presidential cabinet, and U.S. Army officers. Called Freedman's Village, the settlement, unlike other contraband camps, was a model, planned community for the formerly enslaved to progress as they transitioned towards life out of bondage. Government officials also intended for Freedman's Village to serve as a demonstration of the potential of newly freed African Americans to foreign dignitaries and others interested parties.

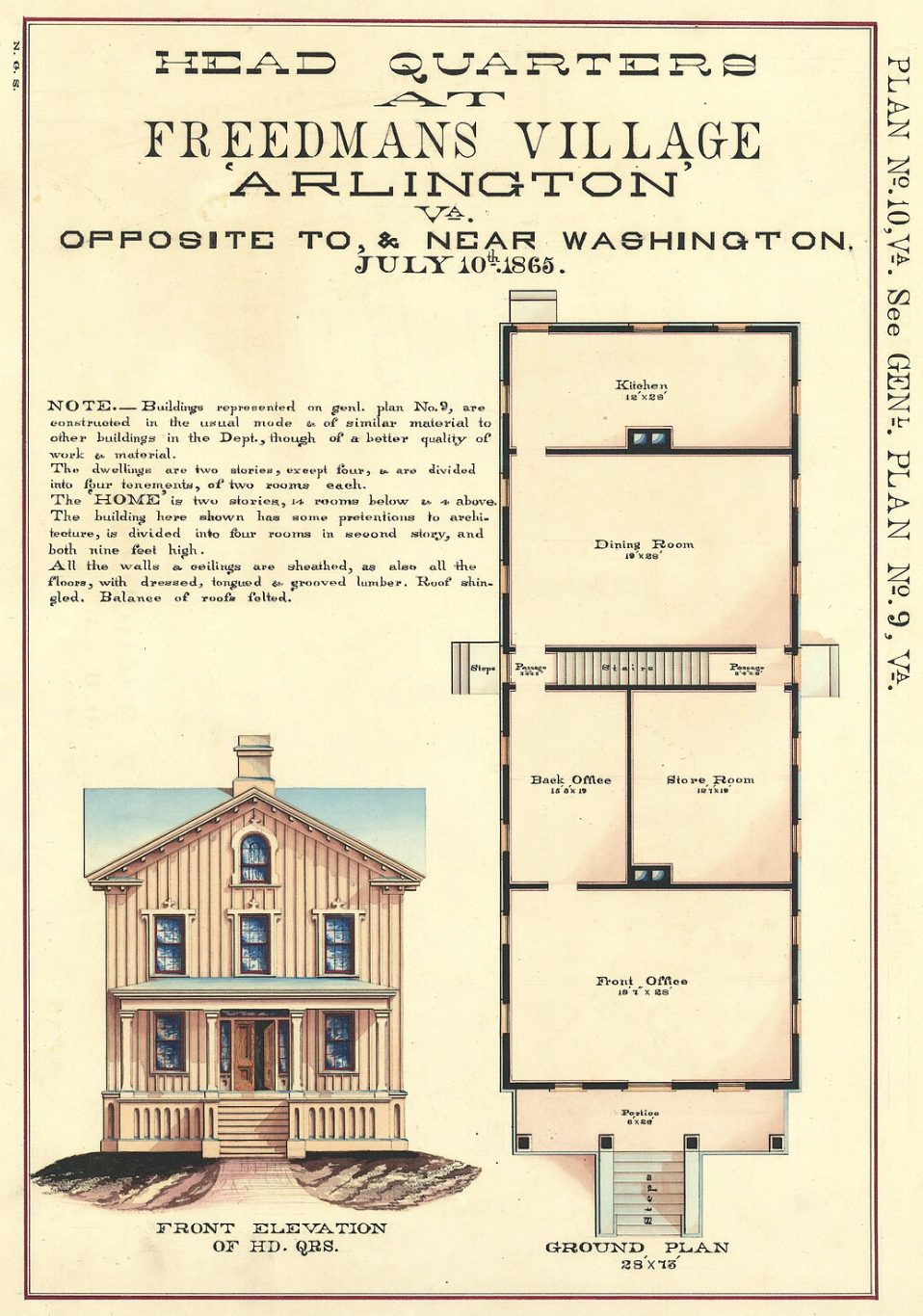
Architectural plan of headquarters at Freedman's Village, 1865

For incoming residents, the U.S. War Department built a series of duplex, wood frame homes in a simplified Classical Revival style. Services in the community included Abbott Hospital, which was named after the Medical Director of the Department of Washington, a schoolhouse that provided primary and secondary education, workshops, a home for the poor, and a chapel. Anderson Ruffin Abbott, the first Black Canadian medical doctor, was Abbott Hospital's Assistant Active Surgeon in-Charge in 1865.

The schoolhouse and chapel were both built by the American Tract Society. Tract Society members also ran the school's educational programs with the assistance of volunteers from Northern states, the government, the United States Colored Troops, and members of Alexandria County's local black community. The school often hosted senior government officials, including Secretary of State William H. Seward, who toured prominent visitors to exhibit the Villagers' progress.

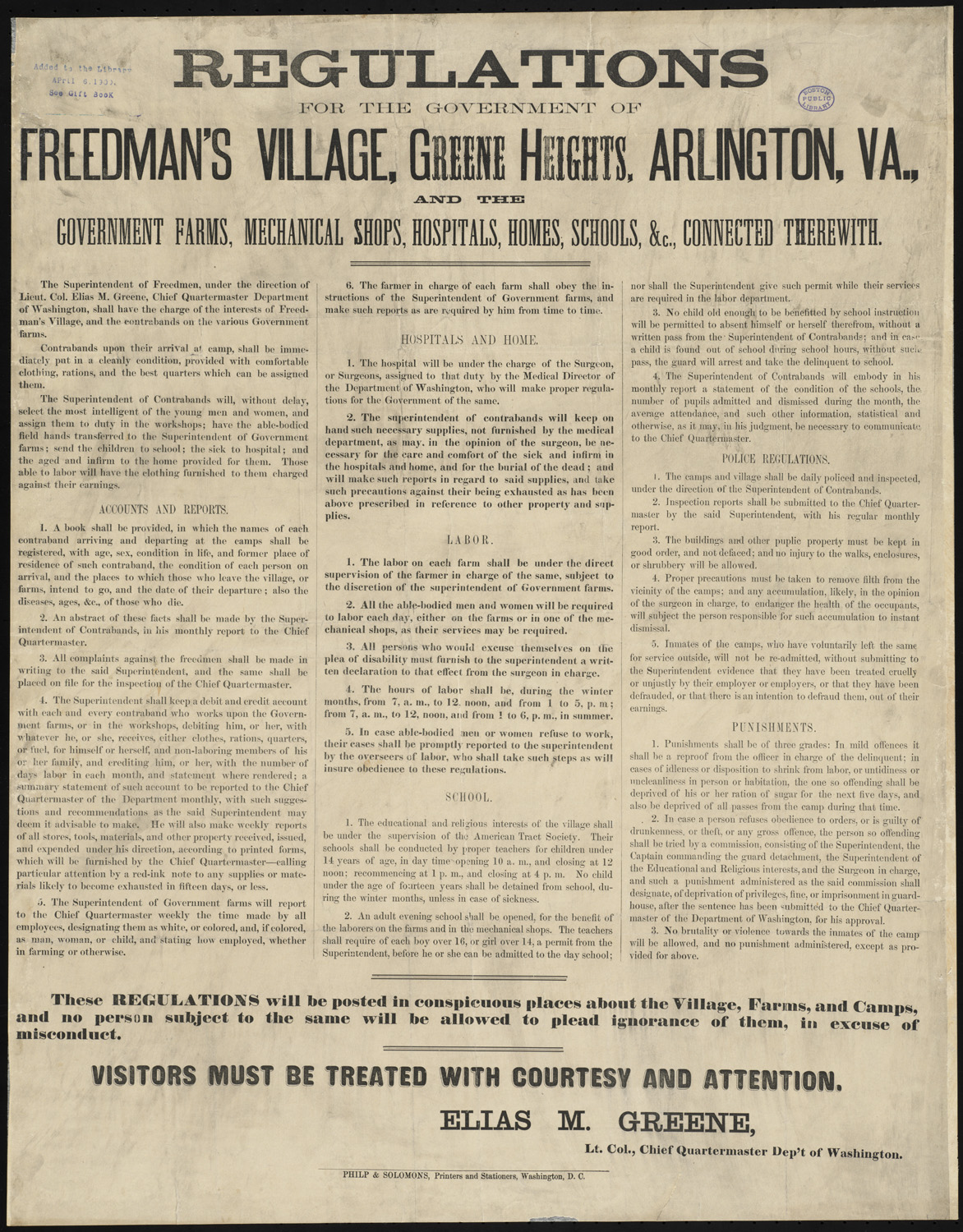
Regulations detailing services and laws governing Freedman's Village, 1860s

Freedman's Village residents were provided with instruction in a variety of vocations and trades, as well as housework, by various societies and organizations. Famous civil rights advocate Sojourner Truth, who as part of her work for the National Freedman's Relief Association, was posted at Freedman's Village for a year. Villagers applied this training in their work as laborers, farmers, craftsmen, and tailors; many were employed by the Union Army for the remainder of the war, as well as in the Village's Abbott hospital and the home for the poor. Villagers were paid $10 per month in wages – $5 of which was taxed to support the contraband community – and supplied with food and clothing. Residents improved and maintained the homes and added outbuildings to house chickens and horses.

The population of Freedman's Village, which was around 100 immediately after its foundation, fluctuated significantly with new arrivals. For example, on March 22, 1864, 408 survivors from the failed freedman's colony on Île-à-Vache off the coast of Haiti came to the Village. Population estimates occasionally surpassed 1000 residents. Conditions were crowded, and there were outbreaks of contagious diseases including tuberculosis and dysentery. Mortality, much of which was driven by diseases such as measles, scarlet fever, and whooping cough among the Village's children, averaged two per day. This represented an improvement relative to Washington's camps, where conditions were worse and average mortality was recorded at 3.5 per day.

Tensions occasionally flared between the residents and the federal managers of Freedman's Village regarding rent payments and the methods employed to encourage self-sufficiency among the contraband, where those that were unable to find employment had food and other provisions withheld, and failure to pay rent would result in expulsion from the village. Villagers expressed their frustration with the $5 contraband tax that, when combined with the $1 to $3 monthly rent and irregular payment of wages, was considered burdensome, and believed their contributions to the Union entitled them to greater levels of assistance.

=== Post-Civil War development ===
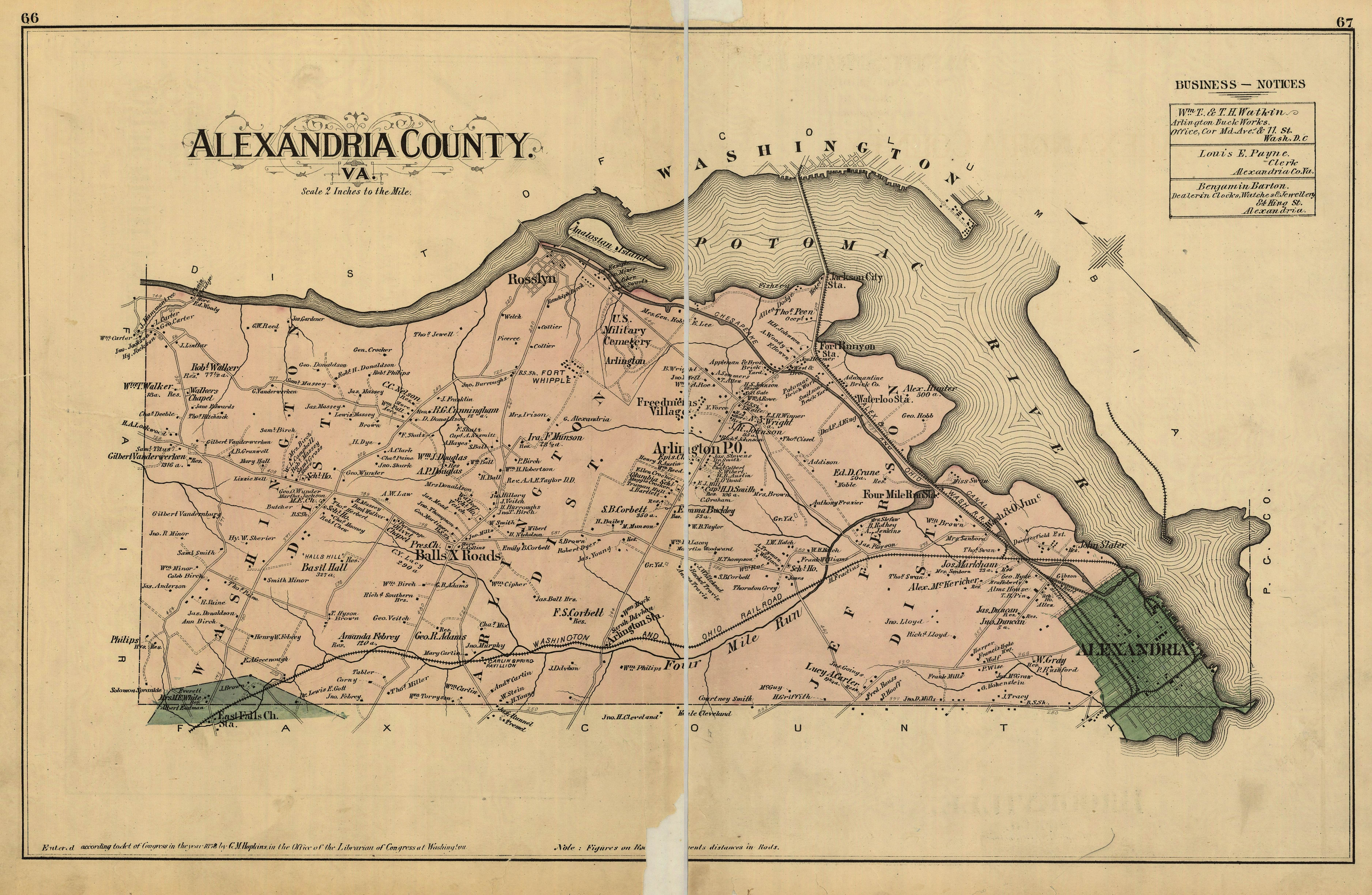
1878 map of Alexandria County. Freedman's Village is visible in the center adjacent to Fort Whipple and Arlington National Cemetery

After Lee's surrender at Appomattox in April 1865, management of Freedman's Village transferred from the War Department to the Freedmen's Bureau, which instituted new regulations in 1866 that were designed to force all residents "remotely capable" of working to find employment. These included a rent policy that required all rents to be paid before the first of the month, which was only loosely enforced. By the fall of 1866, the Bureau implemented more rules in the interest of reducing expenses and ordered that all unemployed residents be expelled from the Village. Reverend Robert S. Laws, a leader in the community, organized meetings in protest of the Bureau's administration of the Village, which was considered harsh, especially on the community's elderly, disabled, sick, and dependent residents. While the Bureau eventually admitted fault and addressed some of the demands of residents, they succeeded in removing Reverend Laws from Freedman's Village in March 1867, who was perceived as the controversy's primary agitator.

During the Reconstruction era, residents of the Village began establishing fraternal organizations, mutual aid societies, and new religious congregations, including a Grand United Order of Odd Fellows in America lodge in 1870. The Little Zion Methodist Church and Old Bell Baptist Church were both founded in 1866; the latter eventually split into the Mount Olive and Mount Zion Baptist Churches in 1873. In 1866, residents partitioned the land surrounding the Village, called Arlington Tract, into five to ten acre lots for rent, which were developed into farms. Villagers found employment at Fort Whipple, which was renamed to Fort Myer in 1881, nearby brickyards, and other jobs in Washington and Alexandria.

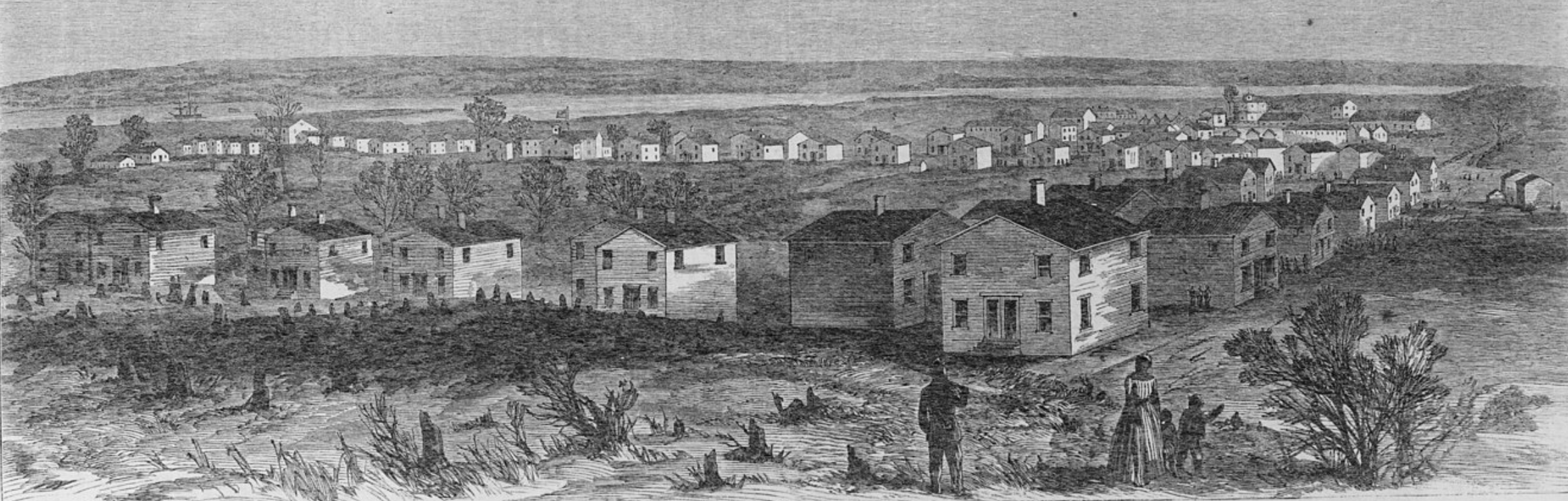
Panoramic print of Freedman's Village, Harper's Weekly, 1864

Freedman's Village also became a center of black political power in Alexandria County. This was made possible by political reforms under Reconstruction that enabled African Americans to vote and rise to elected office, particularly in the newly formed Jefferson District of the county within which Freedman's Village was located. Elected officials from Freedman's Village included James Pollard, who served as justice of the peace, and William A. Rowe, who was the Supervisor of Jefferson District from 1871-1879 and Board Chairman from 1872-1883. However, the political weight of Freedman's Village remained limited by the fact that only a fraction of resident were qualified to vote, as indicated in the participation of only 140 Villagers in the 1888 presidential election. Black officials that were successfully elected were also pushed out by white political leaders due to claimed "inexperience" or failure to pay election dues.

=== Resident eviction and closure of the village ===
Map of Arlington Estate in 1888, including Freedman's Village in the south and Arlington Tract properties

Pressure to dismantle Freedman's Village, which the federal government originally considered a temporary settlement, increased as Radical Republicans began to fall out of political favor nationally, post-war reconciliation between former Unionist and Confederate states was prioritized, and Reconstruction was undermined. Now derided as "squatters" by the government, residents of Freedman's Village, who continued to maintain and improve their homes and community, organized against an attempt in the winter of 1868 to forcibly evict residents and permanently close the Village. The U.S. Army only succeeded in demolishing homes between Arlington House and the Potomac River before calling off the effort; impacted Villagers were relocated elsewhere in the vicinity, and further community activism enabled residents to purchase their homes.

Following the abolition of the Freedman's Bureau in 1872, several parties, including government agencies such as the War Department and the Department of Agriculture, white residents of Alexandria County seeking to reestablish their political and social dominance that had been lost in the aftermath of the Civil War, and land developers all made a renewed push for the closure of Freedman's Village. Conservative white Southern Democrats, in particular, engaged in a smear campaign in the local press to portray Freedman's Village as illegitimate and destitute. Additionally, George Washington Custis Lee, son of Robert E. Lee, had filed a lawsuit in 1877 for the removal of all military installations and Freedman's Village from the former Arlington estate, which eventually reached the U.S. Supreme Court.

The formal purchasing of the Arlington estate from Lee for $150,000 on May 4, 1883 by the government after the 1882 United States v. Lee U.S. Supreme Court decision resulted in Freedman's Village falling under federal ownership. This enabled staff at Fort Myer and Arlington National Cemetery to levy complaints about the Villagers, who were decried as a "nuisance" and accused of logging trees in the cemetery for firewood, to Quartermaster General Samuel B. Holabird. Holabird recommended to Secretary of War William Crowninshield Endicott on November 17, 1887 that all Villagers in the employ of the government be evicted within 90 days, which Endicott approved. Fort Myer Commander Major Louis H. Carpenter, who was made responsible for overseeing the eviction, commissioned an evaluation of Freedman's Village's community and environs before removing the Villagers. Carpenter subsequently reported that the Villager's houses were in excellent condition and that many still possessed their receipts proving their purchasing of property from the Freedman's Bureau in 1868. He also proposed that the value of the Villagers' property be assessed to ensure proper compensation after their eviction, which Carpenter requested be delayed given the circumstances.

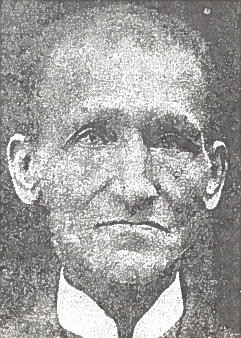
Undated photograph of John B. Syphax

Eviction notices were eventually issued to Villagers on December 7, 1887. Freedman's Village leaders and residents gathered that night to prepare a response, ultimately resolving that a committee be appointed to discuss the matter directly with Secretary Ellicott. They also chose John B. Syphax, a member of the local Syphax family who had been born a freedman before the Civil War and served in the Virginia House of Delegates, to represent Freedman's Village in their negotiations with the government over the community's future. Secretary Ellicott suspended the December 7, 1887 eviction order on December 9, 1887 after reviewing Major Carpenter's report and followed through on the creation of a board to fully survey Freedman's Village, take a census of its inhabitants, evaluate improvements made to residences, and estimate the amount owed to residents.

Many of these people have been soldiers, teamsters, workers on fortifications, and sufferers by the Freedman's Bank swindle. Coming from the shades of the past, these people have proved, in their new condition of self-reliance, more thrifty and less vicious than could be reasonably anticipated;...Twenty-four years residence at Arlington, with all the elements of this case, inspire the hope that full and ample justice will be done even to the weakest members of this great Republic

— John B. Syphax, Request for compensation to Secretary of War, 1888

After completing their assessment, the board ruled that Villagers must be compensated for their lost property and any improvements made; Secretary Ellicott concurred and reissued the eviction order. Syphax argued to Ellicott in 1888 for the validity of the community based on its continued improvement, which he had executed personally as a Freedman's Village resident, the purchasing of property by residents, and the service provided by many residents to the Union during the Civil War. If eviction was unavoidable, Syphax called for each resident to receive $350 each in compensation.

Eventually, the government provided evicted Villagers with an average of $103; some did not receive any. However, the retroactive decision by Congress to regard contraband fund taxes levied on freedman during the war as illegal provided former Freedman's Village residents with additional financial support through reimbursements. In total, evicted residents were given $75,000. By 1900, the last Freedman's Village resident had relocated.

== Aftermath of closure and legacy ==
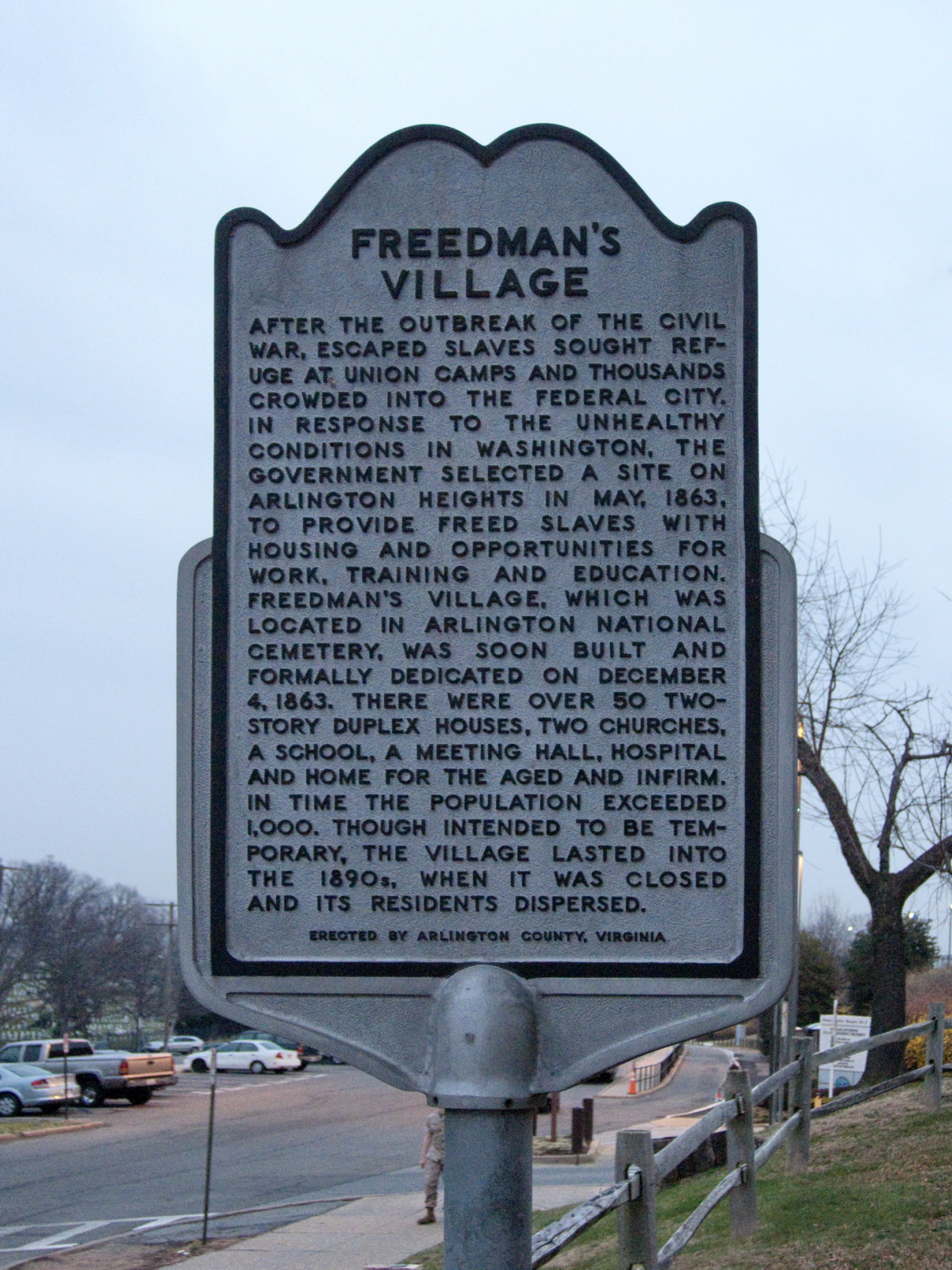
Historical marker in Foxcroft Heights Park describing Freedman's Village

The closure of Freedman's Village led to the dispersal of former residents across black enclaves in Arlington County and the dissemination of the Village's social institutions. Settlements such as Green Valley, which dated from the 1840s, expanded significantly with the arrival of former Village residents. New black communities were also established by former Freedman's Village residents, including Queen City, which grew around two Baptist churches originally established in the Village, Johnson's Hill, which housed a new lodge of the Village's Odd Fellow's chapter, and Butler-Holmes.

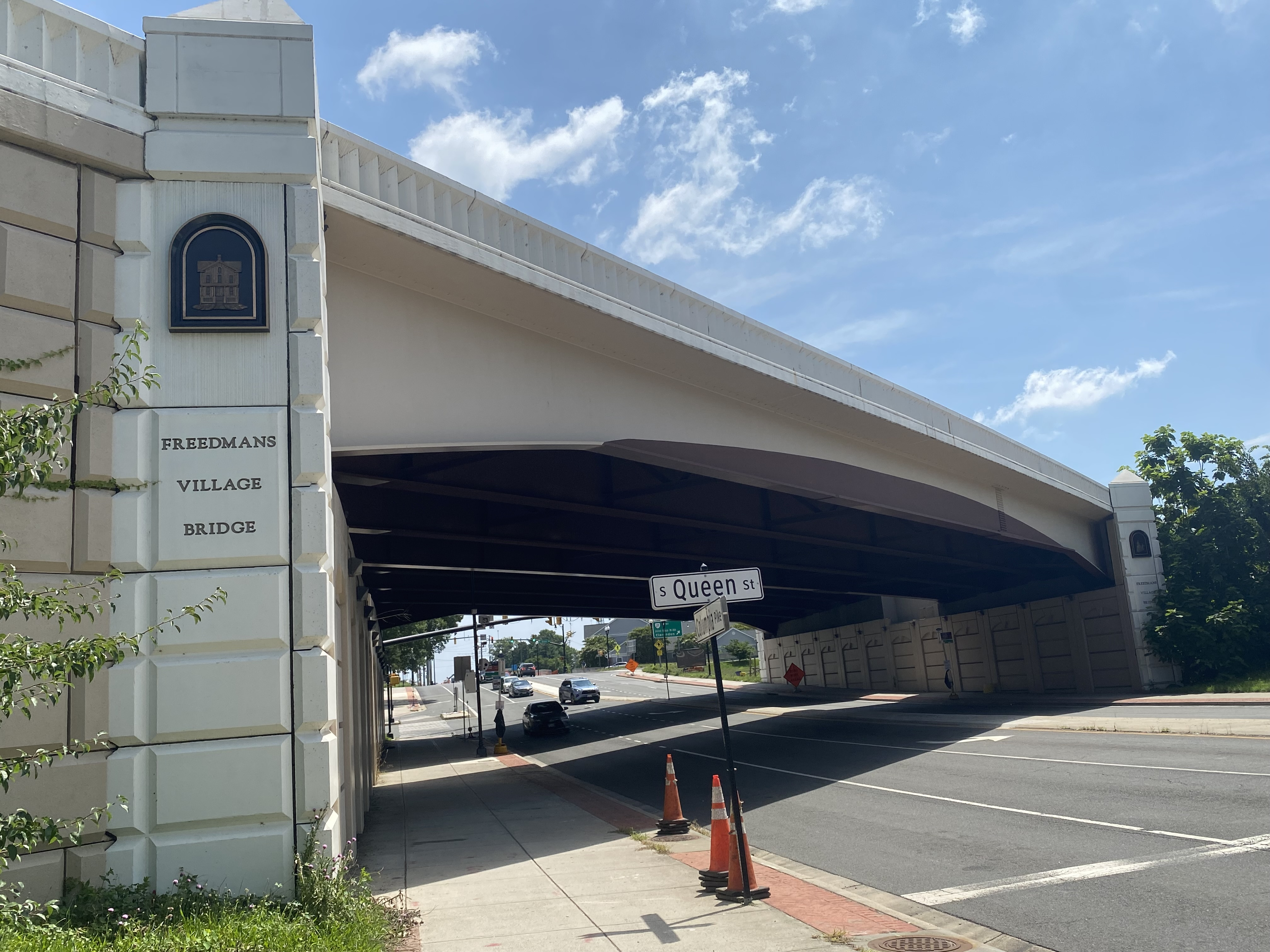
Freedmans Village Bridge in Arlington View

Many residents of these neighborhoods were part of Arlington's growing black middle-class that found employment with the federal government and served as community leaders. Members of Arlington's black working-class, who resided in settlements such as Hall's Hill in northern Arlington, worked in nearby factories or as laborers and domestic workers in Washington. Beyond Arlington's black neighborhoods, some former Freedman's Village residents also moved to white areas such as Ballston. Mutual aid societies and religious congregations founded in Freedman's Village linked these communities together, forming the social foundation of African American life in Arlington County that translated into greater political and civil rights activism in the face of Jim Crow era racial segregation and prejudice.

Today, the site of Freedman's Village is part of Arlington National Cemetery; there are no physical remains of the community besides Jessup, Clayton, and Grant Drives, which follow the route of the Village's main street. The Village is commemorated with historical plaques and markers near its original location. On September 15, 2015, a replacement overpass in the Arlington View neighborhood for Washington Boulevard at Columbia Pike was dedicated as the "Freedmans Village Bridge" in honor of the community.

== Bibliography ==
- Bestebreurtje, Lindsey (2024). Built by the People Themselves: African American Community Development in Arlington, Virginia, from the Civil War through Civil Rights. Columbia: The University of South Carolina Press. ISBN 978-1-64336-498-8.
- James, Felix (April 1970). "The Establishment of Freedman's Village in Arlington, Virginia". Negro History Bulletin. 33 (4): 90–93.
- James, Felix (April 1974). "The Decline of and fall Freedmen's Village in Arlington, Virginia". Negro History Bulletin. 37 (3): 247–250.
- Liebertz, John (2016). A Guide to the African American Heritage of Arlington, Virginia (PDF). Arlington County Department of Community Planning, Housing and Development, Historic Preservation Program.
- Reidy, Joseph R. (October 1987). ""Coming from the Shadow of the Past": The Transition from Slavery to Freedom at Freedmen's Village, 1863-1900". The Virginia Magazine of History and Biography. 95 (4): 403–428.
- Rose, Jr., C. B. (1976). Arlington County, Virginia: A History. Baltimore: Port City Press.
- Schildt, Bobbi (October 1995). "Aladdin's Lamp: Education in Freedman's Village" (PDF). Arlington Historical Magazine. 10 (3): 7–18.

== See also ==
- History of slavery in Virginia
- Virginia in the American Civil War
