= Harry W. Gray House =

Historic house in Virginia, United States

- U.S. National Register of Historic Places
- Virginia Landmarks Register
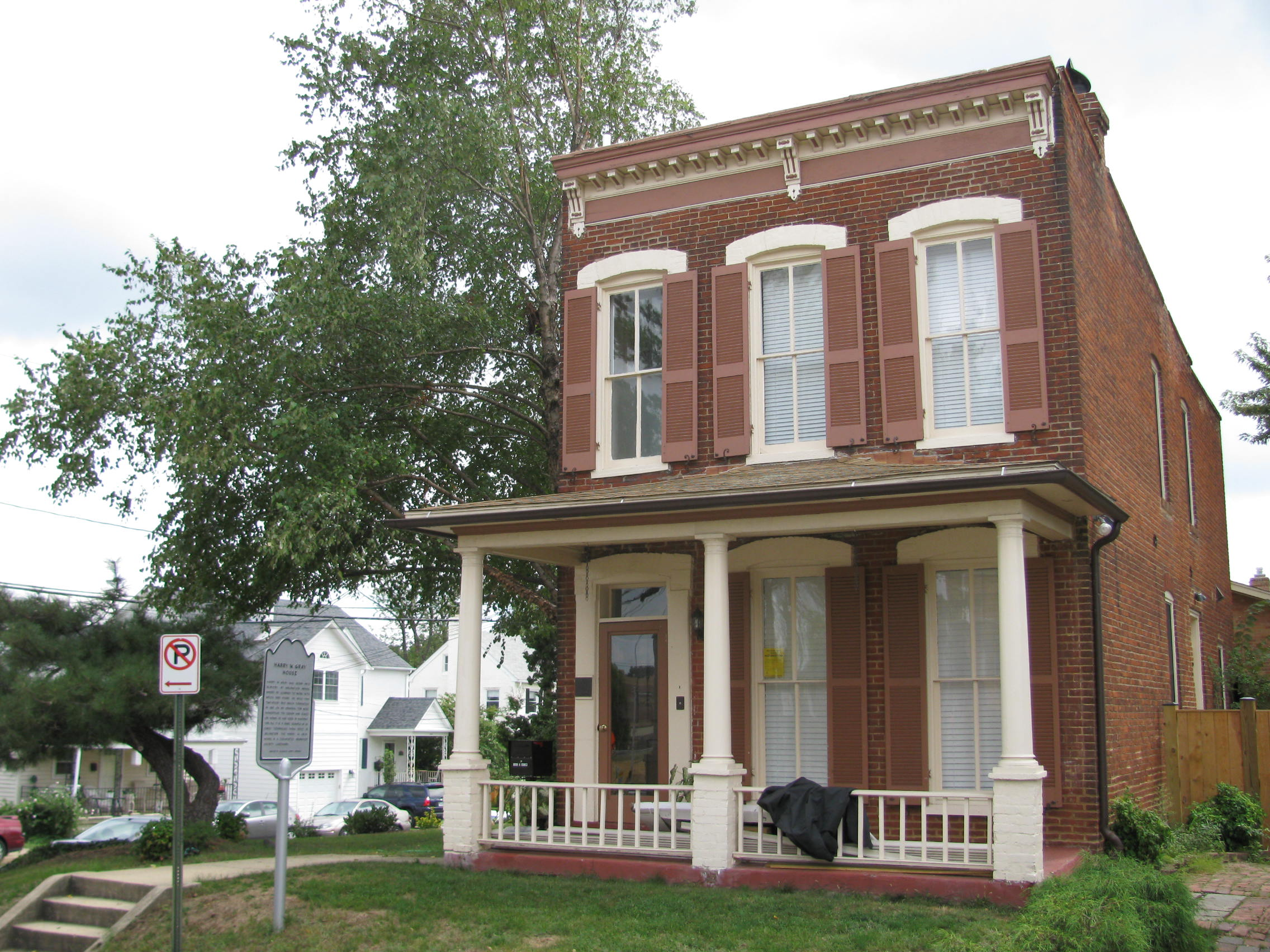
- The Harry W. Gray House

- Location within District of Columbia Location within Virginia Location within the United States
- Location: 1005 S. Quinn St., Arlington, Virginia
- Coordinates: 38°51′53″N 77°4′30″W
- Area: less than one acre
- Built: 1881
- Built by: Gray, Harry W.
- Architectural style: Italianate
- NRHP reference No.: 04000051
- VLR No.: 000-0515

Significant dates
- Added to NRHP: February 11, 2004
- Designated VLR: December 3, 2003

The Harry W. Gray House is a historic home located in the Arlington View neighborhood of Arlington, Virginia. It was built in 1881, and is two-story, three-bay, L-shaped brick free-standing rowhouse dwelling in the Italianate style. It has a standing seam metal shed roof and full-width one-story front porch. It was built by Harry W. Gray (c.1851-1913), a former slave on General Robert E. Lee's Arlington House estate and the son of Selina Gray. It is a rare example of the brick rowhouse in Arlington County.

It was listed on the National Register of Historic Places in 2004.
