= Selina Gray =

Enslaved maid of Mary Anna Custis Lee

Selina Norris Gray
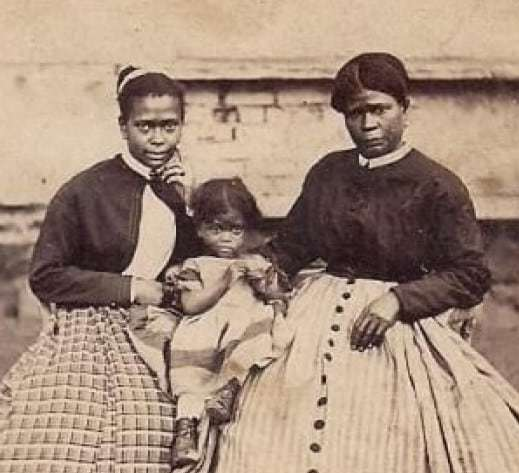
- Grey (right) with two of her children
- Born: December 1823
- Died: 1907 (aged 83–84)

Selina Norris Gray (December 1823 – 1907) was an African American woman known for saving some of George Washington's heirlooms when Union soldiers seized and occupied Arlington House, the home of Confederate Army General Robert E. Lee on May 24, 1861.

When Lee and his wife fled Arlington House, Gray was given the keys to the mansion and responsibility for the main house. The house had heirlooms from George Washington—china, furniture, and art work—because Mary Anna Custis Lee was the great-granddaughter of Martha Washington. Mary Lee's father, George Washington Parke Custis, who built the house, had also been raised by the Washingtons.

Union soldiers took over the house, cut down much of the surrounding trees for firewood and treated the house poorly. Gray noticed that some items were missing. She told the soldiers not to touch "Mrs. Lee's things" and later complained to Union General Irvin McDowell, after which the remaining heirlooms including "a bookcase, knife boxes, dinner plates, a creamer and other china, and a side table" were sent to the Patent Office for safekeeping.

== Life and legacy ==
Gray was the daughter of Leonard and Sally Norris; she was a second-generation enslaved person, a descendant of enslaved people from Mount Vernon. She worked as the personal maid to Mary Lee while she was at Arlington House, becoming head housekeeper. She was married to Thornton Gray around 1847 and the couple had eight children—Emma, Annice, Florence, Sarah, Ada, Selina, John and Harry—who were all born into slavery. She and her family were freed in December 1862, according to the will of George Washington Parke Custis, who ordered that his slaves be freed "no later than" five years after his death which occurred in 1857.

Her family continued to live at Arlington House for several years. Her children were pivotal in the restoration of the building in the 1920s and 1930s; two of her daughters assisted the War Department with the restoration of the house. The house where they lived as enslaved people has been restored by the National Park Service. She and her family bought a 10-acre property in Green Valley, where they grew and sold vegetables and lived the rest of their lives. She died in 1907. One of her sons, Harry, became a skilled mason and worked with the Department of the Interior. His house, the Harry W. Gray House, is on the National Register of Historic Places. His grandson, Thornton H. Gray, was a lawyer who fought with the U.S. Army in World War I, died in 1943, and is buried in Arlington Cemetery.

A rare photograph of Selina Grey surfaced in 2014 on eBay and was purchased by the National Park Service's nonprofit partner, Save Historic Arlington House, for $700. It is the only existing image of an identified enslaved person owned by the Custis and Lee family. There is a park, Selina Gray Square, named for her in Arlington, Virginia.
