= Arlington View, Virginia =

Neighborhood in Virginia, US

Arlington View, Arlington County, Virginia
- Neighborhood
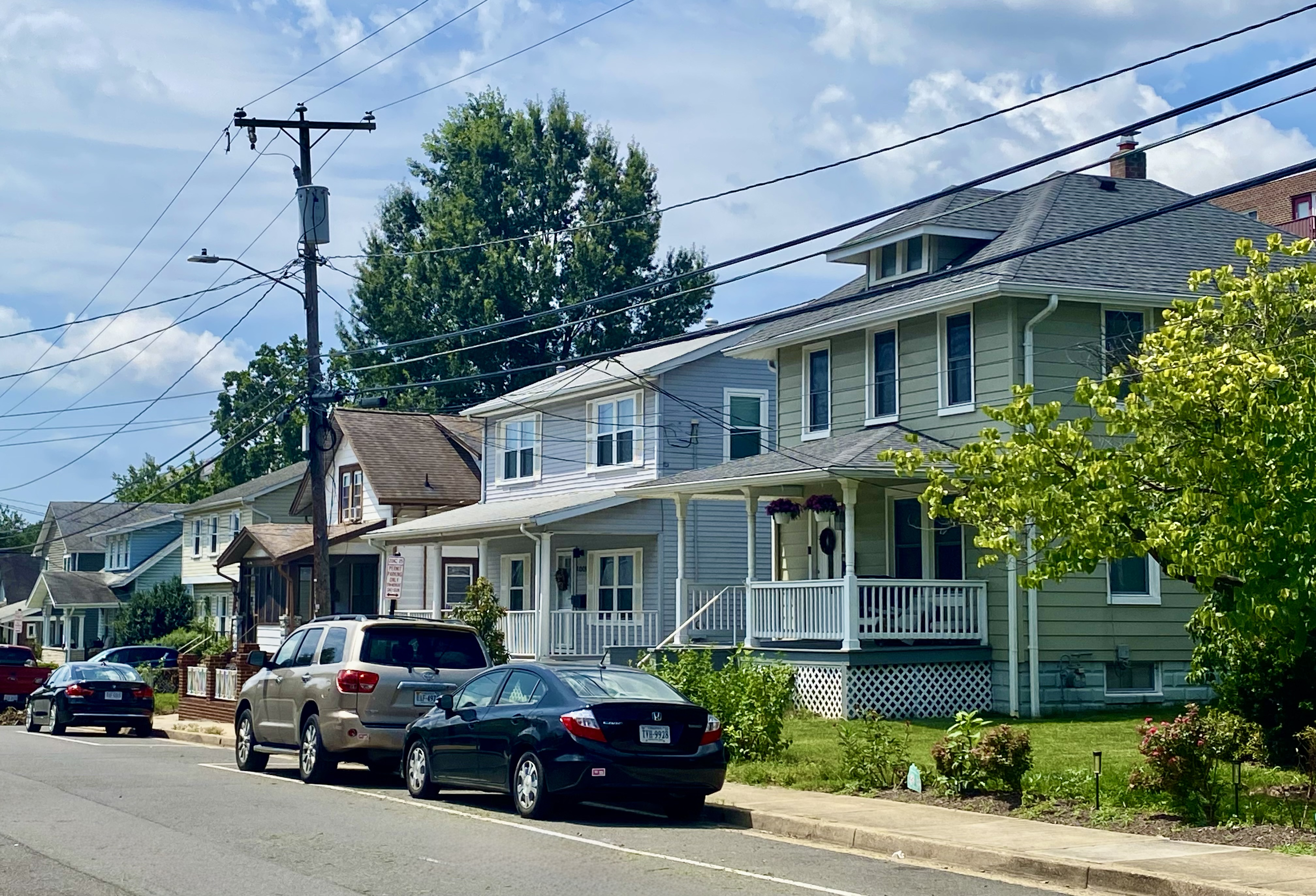
- Historic houses on South Rolfe Street
- Interactive map of Arlington View, Arlington County, Virginia
- Coordinates: 38°51′51″N 77°4′24″W
- Country: United States of America
- State: Virginia
- County: Arlington
- Time zone: UTC-5 (Eastern (EST))
  - Summer (DST): UTC-4 (EDT)
- ZIP codes: 22204
- Area code: 703/571

Arlington View, formerly known as Johnson's Hill, is a historically black neighborhood in Arlington County, Virginia. It is roughly bounded by Columbia Pike, Washington Boulevard, Interstate 395, 15th Street South, and South Rolfe Street.

Arlington View arose as an African American middle class settlement in the 1880s after the Johnston family, who originally operated a plantation on the site of the neighborhood with enslaved labor, began selling plots to black residents. Many were leaving the nearby Freedman's Village community, which the federal government and other parties in Alexandria County sought to close. Arlington View became the site of the Jefferson School (later renamed Hoffman-Boston), an Odd Fellows Hall, Mount Zion Baptist Church, and other African American social institutions, many of which originated in Freedman's Village in the years after the Civil War. Throughout the Jim Crow era, Arlington View was one of several racially segregated black enclaves where African Americans were permitted to live. Its population increased during the first half of the 20th century as Arlington's black population concentrated due to the growing area taken by whites-only suburban developments and the demolition of nearby black neighborhoods during the construction of the Pentagon.

Arlington View residents, in collaboration with Arlington's NAACP branch, filed a lawsuit in the late 1940s against the county government's policies of racial segregation in education and unequal facilities relative to white schools. This built legal momentum against Arlington's long-standing racially discriminatory environment during the civil rights movement, culminating in the integration of Arlington County schools in 1959 and ultimately relieving residents of the county's Jim Crow regime by the late 1960s. Arlington View has since experienced significant racial integration and gentrification, the latter of which has raised costs of living and caused a decline in the neighborhood's black population. Several historical sites in Arlington View are commemorated with markers, and the 1881 Harry W. Gray House, the oldest structure in the neighborhood, was listed on the National Register of Historic Places in 2004.

== History ==
=== Establishment and early development ===
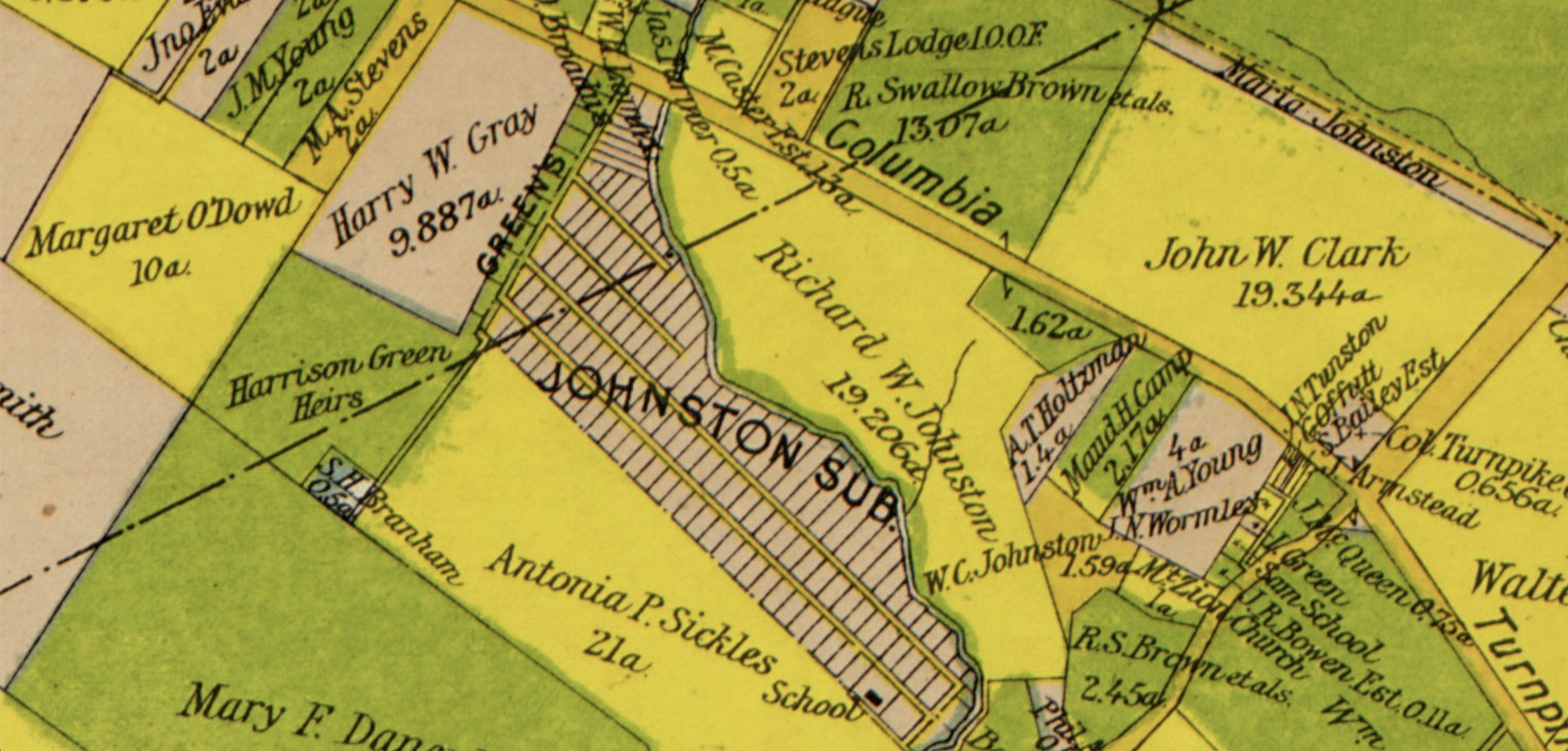
1900 map of Johnson's Hill and the surrounding area. The Gray property, Jefferson School, Odd Fellow's Lodge, and Mount Zion Baptist Church are visible

Before the Civil War, present-day Arlington View was part of an 100-acre plantation owned by John Robert Johnston, which he operated with 15 enslaved people. Johnston established the property in 1856 on land inherited by his wife Ellen, and grew a variety of crops. Following emancipation, Johnston employed some of his formerly enslaved farmhands as sharecroppers; his family continued running the farm into the 1880s.

Johnston, who served as a county official in several positions within Alexandria County's Jefferson District, established the Jefferson School in 1870 on the former premises of Fort Albany, which served as one of two schools for African American students in Alexandria County during the Reconstruction era. Despite his past status as a slave owner, Johnston supported rights for recently emancipated blacks, as well as their political participation in county politics. Johnston also donated parts of his land to Trinity Church, a black episcopal congregation that originated as a chapel for the enslaved on Arlington plantation, and Mount Zion Baptist Church, which had been founded in the nearby Freedman's Village community.

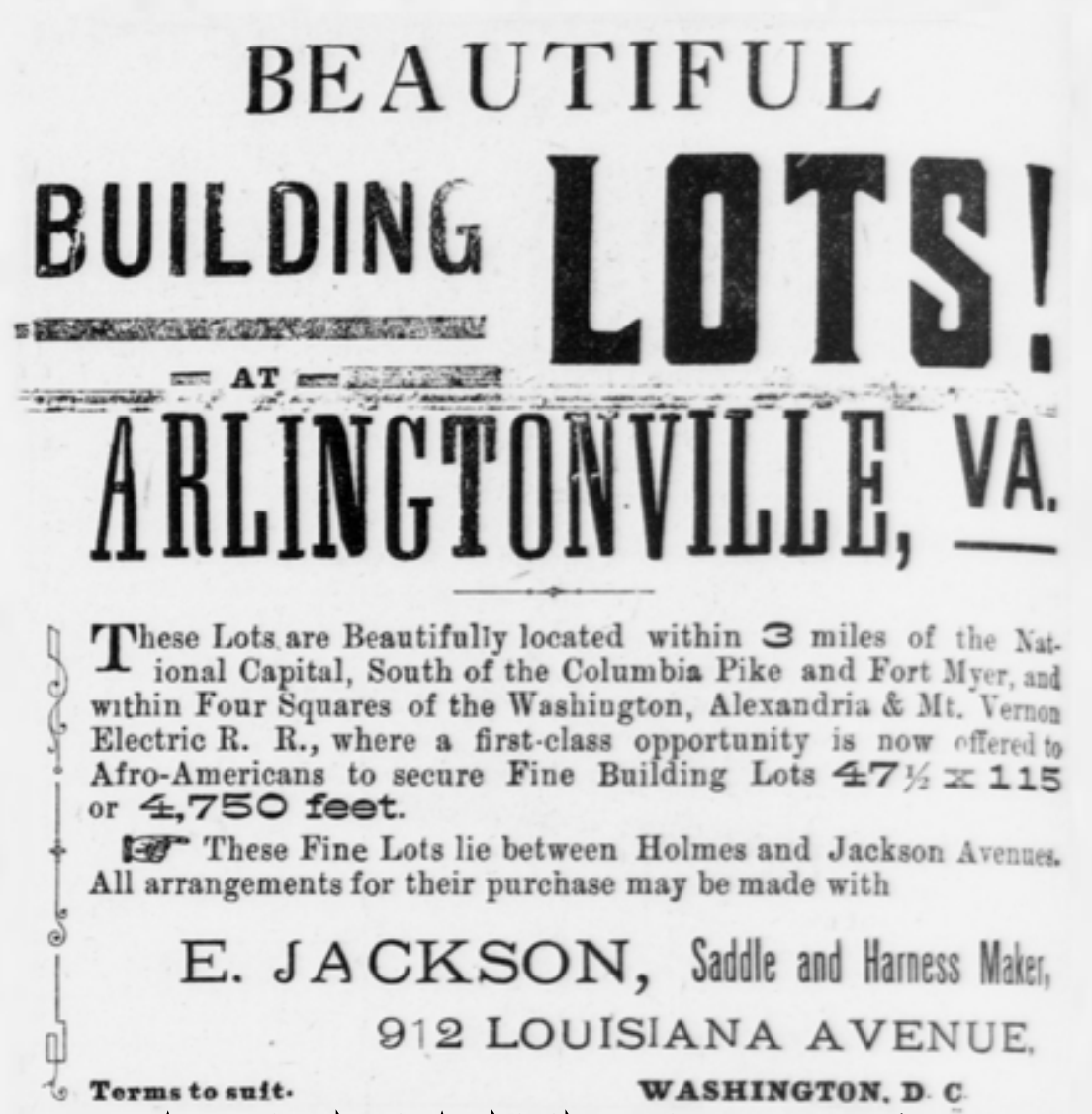
1896 ad featuring Arlingtonville in the Washington Bee

After his death in 1881, Johnston's sons Richard and William began to sell their inherited landholdings to black residents. Many were former inhabitants of Freedman's Village, which had faced increasing pressure to close from the federal government, Alexandria County's white residents, and land developers as Reconstruction faltered. Richard platted the Johnston subdivision 1888; part of this and adjacent parcels were sold to Emmanuel Jackson in 1889, who further expanded the bounds of the subdivision. Jackson advertised the community as "Arlingtonville" in publications such as the African American newspaper The Washington Bee, but it was later renamed Johnson's Hill.

While Johnson's Hill had relatively few amenities beyond the Jefferson School, which had moved to the neighborhood in 1889, it was the location of an Odd Fellow's Hall that became an important social institution for Alexandria County's growing African American middle class. Originally established in Freedman's Village in 1870, the hall organized community events, served as a credit union, and provided mutual aid. It also hosted other black community organizations, such as the Freemasons, before they established permanent locations

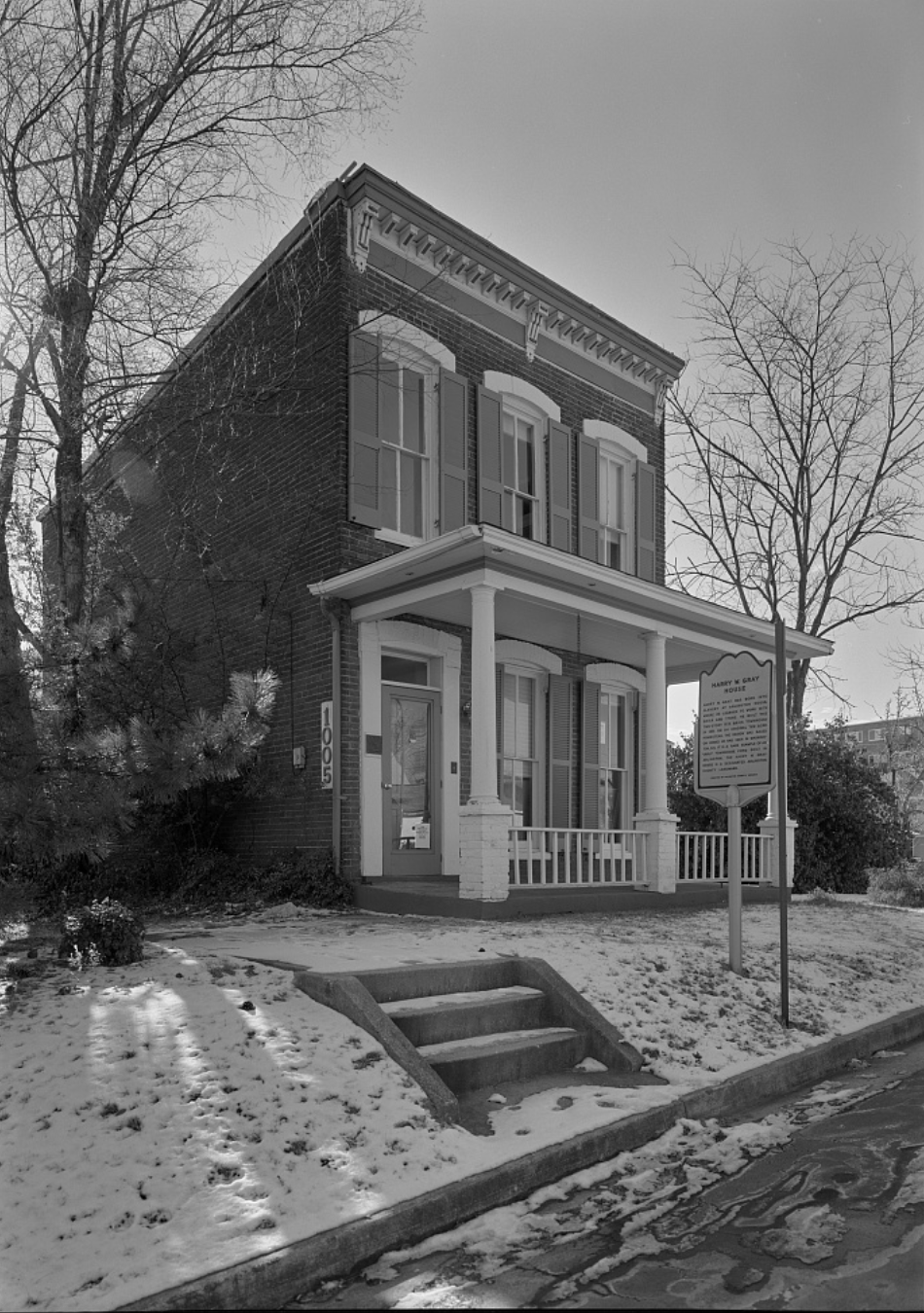
Harry W Gray House

By 1900, Johnson's Hill had around 400 residents, a music hall, and a Masonic Lodge. New subdivisions, including Arlington View and Southgate Vale, were plated within the vicinity of the neighborhood. Many residents found employment as domestic workers and laborers in the county's brickyards, which was at the time Arlington's largest industrial business and driven by the area's increasing suburbanization. Others worked as clerks for the federal government in Washington. Prominent early residents included the Gray family, whose patriarch, Harry, was originally enslaved on Arlington plantation and lived in Freedman's Village in the post-war period. Harry and his wife Martha, who were both employees at the Department of the Interior, built an Italianate-style home in Johnson's Hill in 1881. Designed after row houses in Washington's Foggy Bottom neighborhood, the structure was listed on the National Register of Historic Places in 2004.

=== Jim Crow era ===
The expansion of commuter rail service in Arlington from 1870 to 1900 stimulated suburban development throughout the county, which centered around stops along the growing trolley network. This occurred during the rise of Jim Crow laws in post-Reconstruction Arlington that instituted a wide range of restrictions on the economic mobility and freedom of Johnson's Hill's black residents.

Many of these policies were pushed by developers and boosters including Crandal Mackey and Frank Lyon, whose Southern Progressive agenda and Good Citizens League organization defined Arlington's politics around the turn of the century. League members conducted "clean up" raids on saloons and gambling halls, most infamously in the interracial neighborhood of Rosslyn in 1904, participated in the Virginia Constitutional Convention of 1901–02 that disenfranchised black voters through poll taxes, and developed white suburban subdivisions via racially restrictive housing covenants. The 1896 Plessy v. Ferguson U.S. Supreme Court decision that legalized "separate but equal" racial segregation enabled the Virginia Assembly to pass zoning ordinances in 1912 that created "segregation districts" throughout the state, which were adopted in Arlington. While these eventually struck down by the 1917 Buchanan v. Warley decision, county planners and developers restricted the growth of black neighborhoods in other ways, including through Arlington's 1930 zoning ordinance that prevented further construction of more affordable multifamily housing in black communities.

Like Arlington's other black enclaves, the impact of these Jim Crow policies on Johnson's Hill was smaller lots, increased density, and higher land values as the county's African American community had decreasing space on which they were permitted to live. This was reflected by the layout of Gray's Subdivision, whose original 4 lot arrangement was divided into 70 individual lots following Harry Gray's death in 1913. Johnson's Hill also did not receive the same level of services or improvement as Arlington's growing white subdivisions, and had unpaved roads into the 1960s. Despite this, Johnson's Hill continue to retain its reputation as a middle-class neighborhood, and attracted black residents from Washington and around the region. It also had a series of businesses, including a grocery store, that served its African American residents, who were mostly unwelcome in Arlington's white establishments.

The neighborhood's segregated Jefferson School, which had expanded into a 4-room schoolhouse in 1915, added an 8-room addition with support from the Rosenwald Fund in 1931; it was later renamed the Hoffman-Boston Junior Colored High School in 1932 after two former principals of Jefferson and Kemper Schools. In 1939, Hoffman-Boston instituted a K–12 curriculum. Prior to this, black students in Arlington that wanted to enter high school were required to attend segregated schools in Washington; non-residents were mostly refused enrollment in D.C. schools by 1949.

=== Wartime demolitions and public housing ===
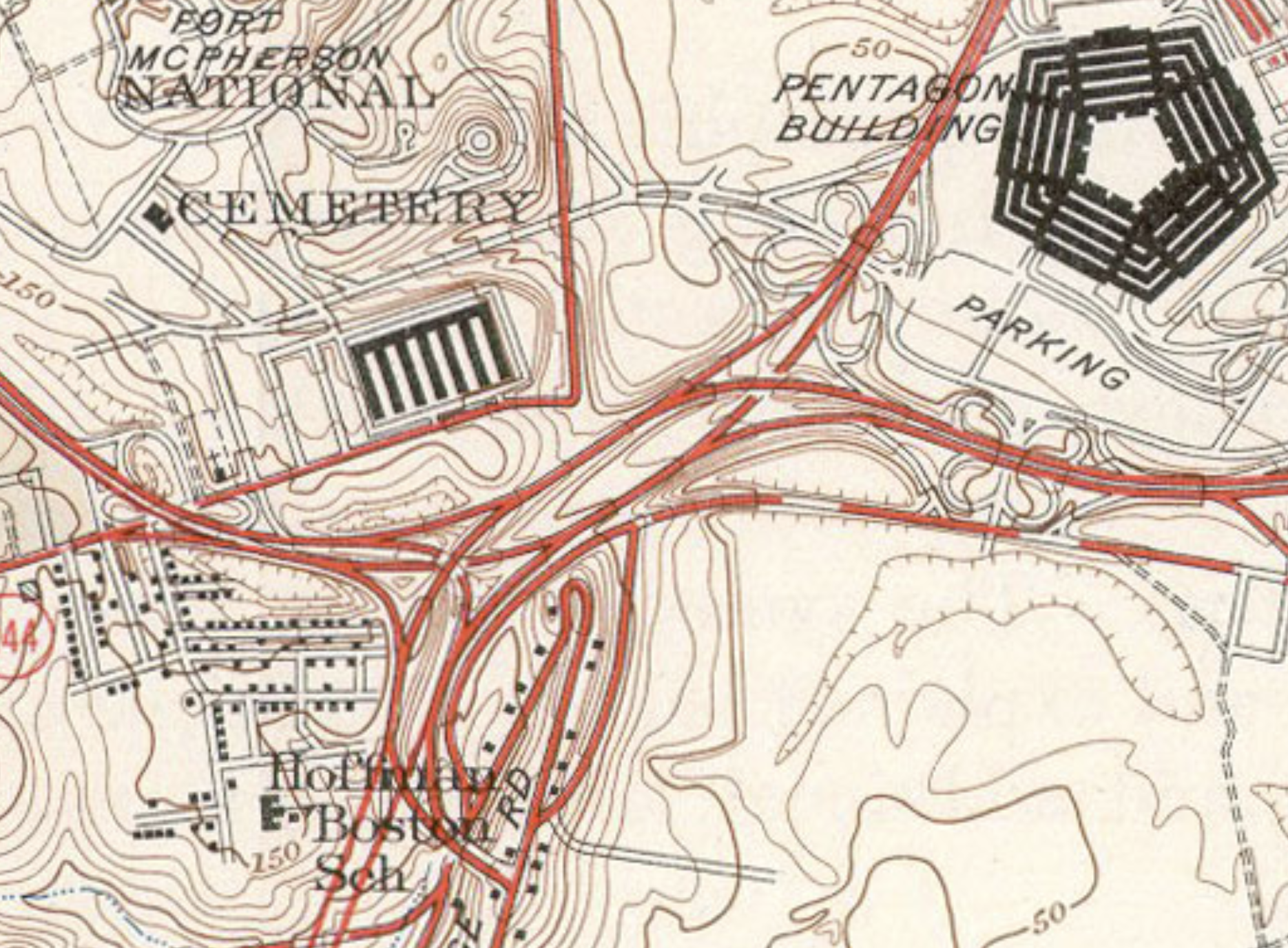
1945 map of Johnson's Hill, the Pentagon, the Navy Annex, and their respective highway networks

The expansion of government during World War II saw the demolition of the nearby black settlements of East Arlington and Queen City in the early 1940s, which were cleared by the government through eminent domain to make way for the Pentagon, Navy Annex, parking lots, and highways. In addition to displacing 810 residents, Mount Olive Baptist Church, which had been in Queen City since the late 19th century, was razed and relocated to Johnson's Hill. Refuse from the Pentagon's construction was dumped by the government in Johnson's Hill's ravines, which degraded the outward appearance and condition of the neighborhood.

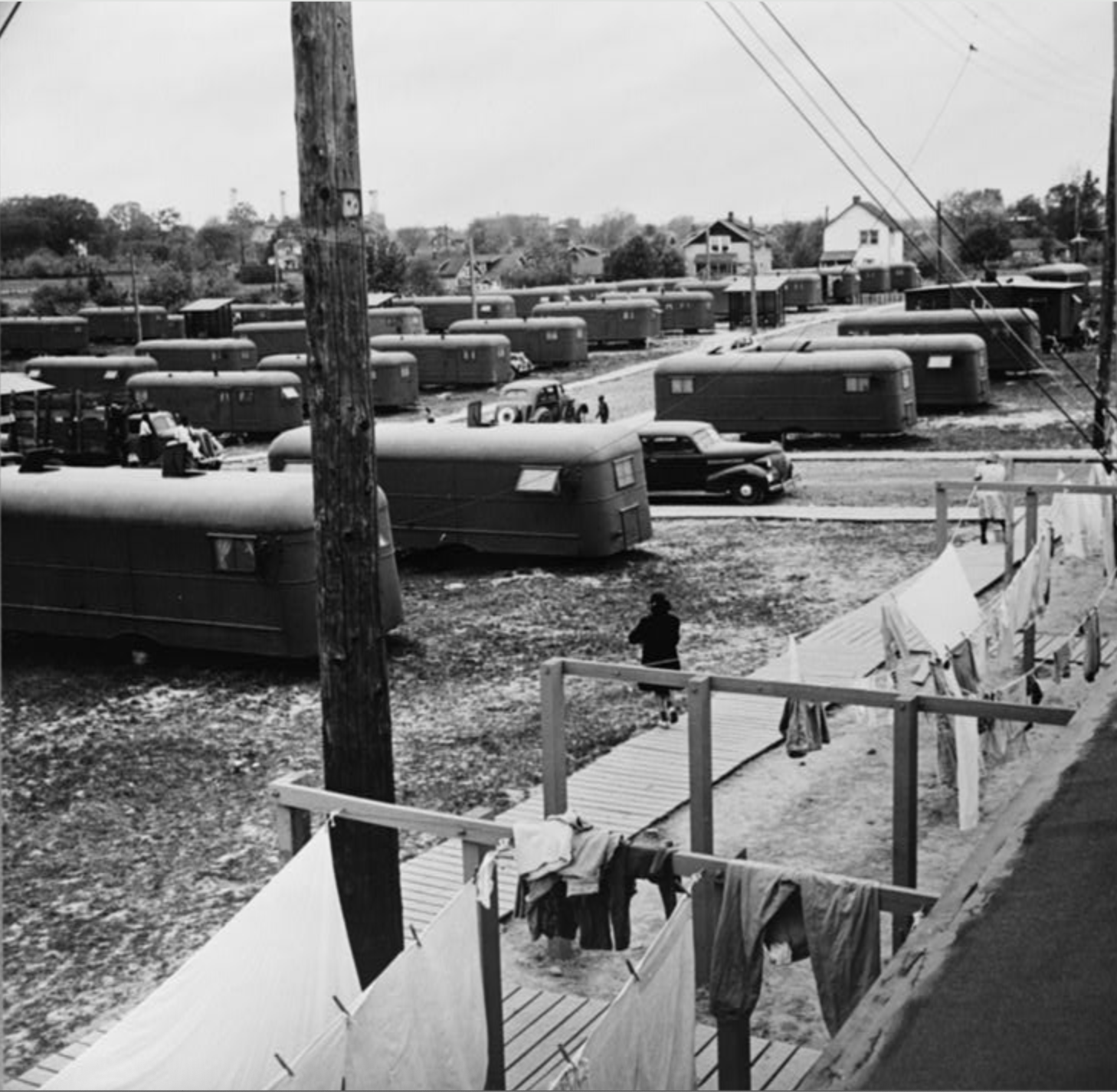
Arlington Trailer Camp in April 1942

Prevailing Jim Crow segregation in Arlington severely limited the housing options of the evicted communities, and those that were unable to find accommodations moved into two temporary trailer camps offered by the government to evicted residents. One of these, the 25-acre Arlington Trailer Camp, was located in Johnson's Hill. The camp was created by the U.S. Army after an intervention by First Lady Eleanor Roosevelt, who after receiving a letter from an attorney representing displaced residents, pressured the House Armed Services Committee to provide housing to those made homeless by the Pentagon's construction.

The Arlington Trailer Camp was partially abandoned by 1943 due to poor living conditions, and was fully closed in 1949. Meanwhile, the Federal Public Housing Authority (FPHA) built the segregated George Washington Carver Project adjacent to the camp in 1943; many leaving the camp moved into these homes. The community consistent of 100 temporary dwellings, but were too small for many of the families. By comparison, thousands of permanent and temporary public housing units were built for Arlington's white residents during this period; none were trailer camps. Johnson Hill residents decried the Carver site as an "eyesore" until the Public Housing Administration demolished them in 1954.

In 1944, First Lady Roosevelt toured Arlington's African American public housing sites, including those in Johnson's Hill, to heighten awareness of the black community's plight. Following this, the FPHA purchased over 3 3/4 acres of land in the neighborhood to build more public housing for Arlington's African American residents. The 44-unit George Washington Carver Homes were completed on the site in 1944. They were designed by Albert Cassell, a prominent black architect and head of architecture at Howard University whose portfolio included much of the university's Washington campus.

After the end of the war, the FPHA was directed by Congress, which under the 1949 Lanham Act prioritized the conversion of wartime public housing to affordable housing, to dispose of Carver Homes. Tenants organized to purchase the property after Arlington County declined to acquire it, as they feared an alternative owner would turn it into a whites-only community. The George Washington Carver Mutual Homes Association, which formed from this effort, successfully converted Carter Homes into one of the first black housing cooperatives in the United States. Carver Homes was ultimately demolished in 2016, and is commemorated with historical markers located in the George Washington Carver Mini-Park.

=== Civil rights era ===
The influx of federal workers into Arlington during the New Deal era and World War II drove rapid suburbanization throughout the county, and developers of whites-only neighborhoods sought the land occupied by black neighborhoods. This encroachment resulted in the loss of a majority of Arlington's black communities; by 1950, Johnson's Hill, Green Valley, and Hall's Hill were the only 3 remaining areas blacks could live in the county. Concentration of Arlington's black community into these enclaves caused overcrowding, and by 1962 Johnson's Hill had 311 homes that housed 1,116 people.

Population growth also fundamentally altered Arlington's politics. Its traditional Southern Democratic political establishment, which favored racial segregation and consisted of Southerners in the mold of Mackey and Lyon, was gradually replaced with more liberal, New Deal Democrats and white moderate figures. This coincided with a rising civil rights movement in Arlington, reflected in the establishment of its NAACP branch in 1940 and Green Valley resident Jessie Butler's legal challenge to Virginia's poll tax in 1949.

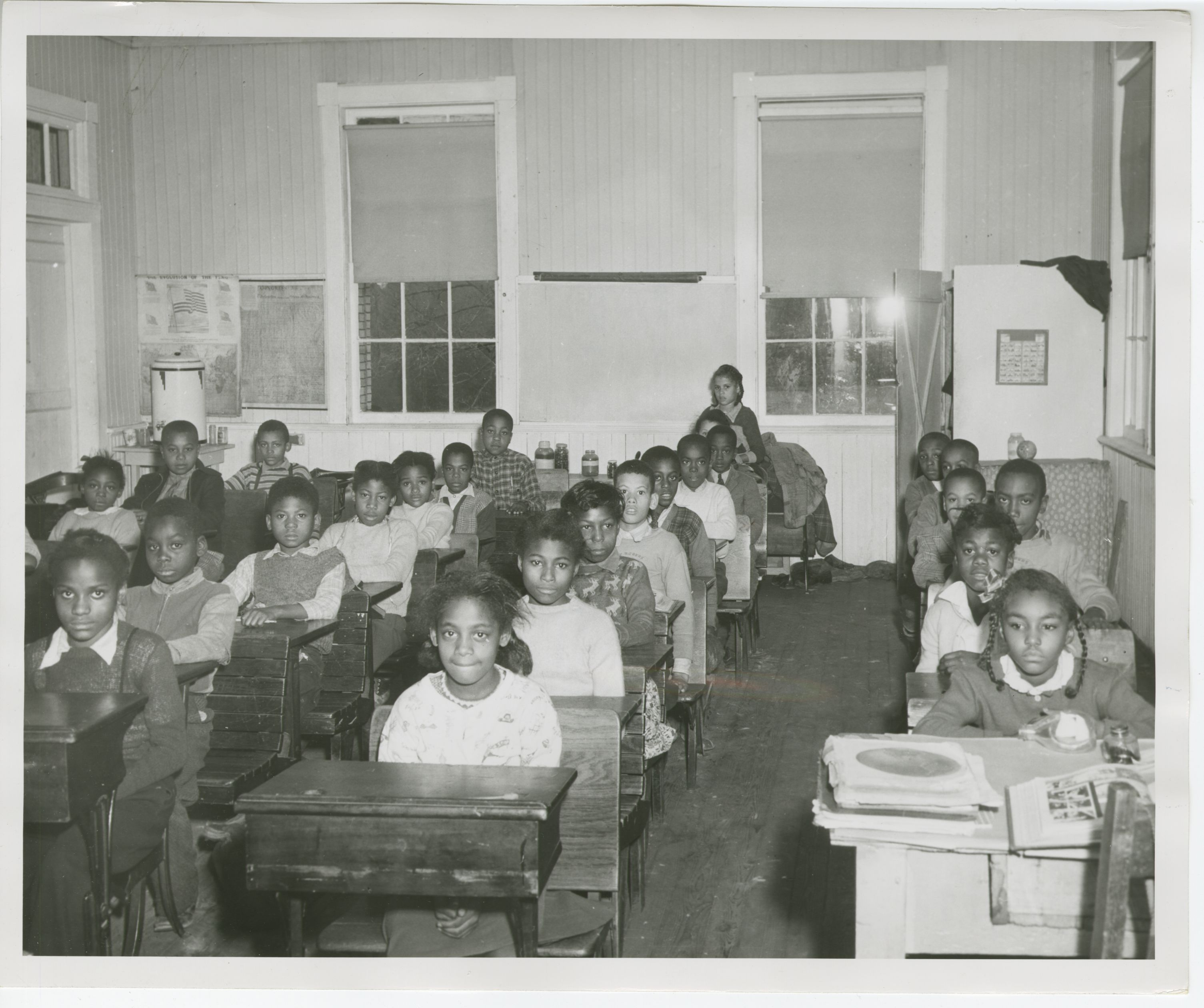
1947 image of the science room at Hoffman-Boston, which was used as an exhibit in Carter's lawsuit

Early civil rights activism in Johnson's Hill was focused on the quality of education at Hoffman-Boston. This was in part enabled by the rejection of black Arlington students from Washington public high schools in the late 1940s, which gave NAACP, Constance Carter, and several other students of Hoffman-Boston grounds to sue the Arlington County School Board in 1947 regarding the inferiority of Hoffman-Boston's facilities relative to the whites-only Washington-Lee High School. While the Fourth Circuit Court ultimately ruled in their favor, the case did not result in the integration of schools and instead forced the county to upgrade Hoffman-Boston; improvements included a separate elementary school, gymnasium, and a cafeteria built between 1951 and 1953.

The 1947 lawsuit motivated further challenges by NAACP and Arlington's black residents against racial segregation. This was in the face of Virginia's massive resistance program against racial integration of schools lead by Senator Harry F. Byrd after the 1954 Brown v. Board of Education U.S. Supreme Court ruling that struck down "separate but equal" policies nationwide. Racist hate groups, including George Lincoln Rockwell's American Nazi Party and the county's Ku Klux Klan, also rose in opposition to the dismantling of Arlington's racial segregation.

A 1956 lawsuit by NAACP and three residents from Hall's Hill against Arlington's segregation in schooling initiated an extended legal fight that lasted until February 2, 1959, when Stratford Junior High School in Cherrydale was racially integrated with the admission of four black students. The integration, while tense, occurred with relative peace and was dubbed "the day nothing happened" in the local press. Hoffman-Boston's senior high school was closed in 1964 to facilitate racial integration, and until 1971 the Hoffman-Boston building hosted integrated junior high school classes. In 1960, the Cherrydale sit-ins organized by the Nonviolent Action Group at Howard University resulted in the desegregation of Arlington businesses, and with the passing of the Civil Rights Act of 1968, de jure racial housing discrimination in Arlington was officially outlawed.

=== Neighborhood conservation and improvements ===
Arlington County adopted its first Master Plan in 1961 that called for urban renewal and revitalization of "old and obsolete areas." This especially threatened the county's black enclaves like Johnson's Hill that had long been denied government services, infrastructure, and improvements. Even as Johnson's Hill had mostly maintained its middle class composition and character, the neighborhood's age, lack of contractors willing to work with black homeowners, and the regulations introduced by the 1930s zoning ordinance meant that about 16% of its homes were in some state of disrepair or decay by this period. This enabled white county planners to categorize it as a "slum" in need of significant intervention. Part of Johnson's Hill was demolished during the 1960s expansion of Shirley Memorial Highway; this included Mount Zion Baptist Church, which moved to Green Valley.

The formation of Arlington's Neighborhood Conservation Plan in 1963, which had been established in light of anticipated highway construction as well as the eventual arrival of the Washington Metro, provided Johnson's Hill residents with an opportunity to lobby the county government for much needed infrastructure improvements. Prior to this, Johnson's Hill community members had initiated efforts in the 1950s to clean up the neighborhood. These efforts resulted in Johnson's Hill's inclusion in the first set of neighborhoods identified for conservation in February 1965. It was during this initiative that the government changed the name of Johnson's Hill to Arlington View, after the earlier subdivision platted nearby. As a part of the plan, Arlington View's remaining dirt roads were paved, sidewalks and gutters were installed, and culs-de-sacs were constructed on dead-end roads.

=== Racial integration and recent developments ===
The dismantling of Arlington's segregation following the successes of the Civil rights movement enabled greater racial integration and diversity, which increased substantially between the 1970s and 1980s; members of longstanding Arlington View black families were also able to move elsewhere in the county and beyond. As Arlington became increasingly wealthy with greater urbanization and the completion of its Metrorail line in 1979, Arlington View's black residents struggled to adjust to rising costs of living, with some either falling into poverty or moving away. Despite the Conservation Plan funds secured in the 1960s, Arlington View was also in need of further reinvestment and revitalization by the 1990s. Both of these factors rendered Arlington View relatively affordable compared to other areas of Arlington, which brought non-black residents looking for inexpensive housing. The completion of the Carrington Homes townhouse community in the 1980s, which attracted white, Asian, and Hispanic residents to the neighborhood, exemplified this change.

Like Arlington's other historically black neighborhoods, Arlington View had experienced gentrification in the 21st century, reflected by the replacement of Carver Homes with luxury townhouses in 2016. The community's black population has also declined, falling from 99% African American in 1970 to around 62% in 2010. According to the U.S. Census Bureau's American Community Survey results, this fell further to around 26% by 2023.

== Geography ==
Arlington View is generally bounded by Columbia Pike, Washington Boulevard, Interstate 395, 15th Street South, and South Rolfe Street. It is immediately adjacent to several highway interchanges along Interstate 395, as well as the Army Navy Country Club. Arlington View borders the neighborhoods of Foxcroft Heights, Arlington Ridge, Columbia Heights, and Penrose.

== Infrastructure ==
Major Arlington County thoroughfares, including Columbia Pike, Washington Boulevard, and Interstate 395, all border Arlington View. The Washington Boulevard Trail, a shared-use path that follows Washington Boulevard and links to the Arlington Boulevard Trail, is accessible on South Rolfe Street. It is served by the following Metrobus and Arlington Transit bus routes:

- Metrobus A40: Columbia Pike-National Landing
- Metrobus F44: Columbia Pike-Pentagon
- ART 42: Ballston-Pentagon

Route A40 provides service to the Pentagon City and Crystal City Metrorail Stations on the Blue and Yellow lines, while F44 provides service to Pentagon Station. ART 42 provides service between the Ballston and Pegaton Metrorail stations, the former of which is on the Orange and Silver lines.

== Parks and recreation ==
Arlington View Park, a small 0.1 acre park located on South Rolfe Street, contains benches, green space, and a public sculpture. George Washington Carver Park, which is similarly sized, features a fountain and historical markers detailing the history of the former Carver Homes that stood nearby until 2016. Hoffman-Boston Elementary School is located on South Queen Street and hosts the Carver Community Center, which has a six-acre park, a fitness room, and basketball and pickleball facilities. The Arlington View Civic Association also hosts an annual Neighborhood Day at the Carver Community Center that includes presentations on and celebrations of the community's history.

== Bibliography ==
- Bestebreurtje, Lindsey (2024). Built by the People Themselves: African American Community Development in Arlington, Virginia, from the Civil War through Civil Rights. Columbia: The University of South Carolina Press. ISBN 978-1-64336-498-8.
- Liebertz, John (2016). A Guide to the African American Heritage of Arlington, Virginia (PDF). Arlington County Department of Community Planning, Housing and Development, Historic Preservation Program.
- Perry, Nancy (2017). "How Eminent Domain Destroyed an Arlington Community" (PDF). Arlington Historical Magazine. 16 (1): 6–17.
- Perry, Nancy; Waters, Nigel (May 2013). "Southern Suburb/Northern City: Black Entrepreneurship in Segregated Arlington County, Virginia". Urban Geography. 33 (5): 655–674. doi:10.2747/0272-3638.33.5.655.

== See also ==
- High View Park
- Nauck, Virginia
- Freedman's Village
