= Nauck, Virginia =

Neighborhood in Arlington, Virginia

Coordinates: 38°50′55″N 77°05′18″W

Nauck (Green Valley), Arlington, Virginia
- Neighborhood
- Interactive map of Nauck (Green Valley), Arlington, Virginia
- Country: United States of America
- State: Virginia
- County: Arlington
- ZIP Code: 22204, 22206
- Area code: 703

Nauck is the former name of a neighborhood in the southern part of Arlington County, Virginia, now known as Green Valley. It is bordered by Four Mile Run and Shirlington to the south, Douglas Park to the west, I-395 to the east, and Columbia Heights and the Army-Navy Country Club to the north. The southeastern corner of the neighborhood borders the City of Alexandria.

The neighborhood acquired the name of "Nauck" when John D. Nauck, a former Confederate Army soldier who was serving the county as a Justice of the Peace and in other positions, purchased, subdivided and sold 46 acres of farmland from 1874 to 1900 in its area, thus laying the foundation for the neighborhood's development. In 2019, the Nauck Civic Association voted to change its name to the "Green Valley Civic Association" to remove the name of a Confederate from that of an organization which by that time represented what had become a historically black neighborhood. The association next asked the Arlington County Civic Federation to approve its proposed name change, which the Federation did later that year. Although the County government will change its relevant databases and maps to reflect the association's new name, the County Board has not voted to alter the name of the neighborhood itself.

== History ==
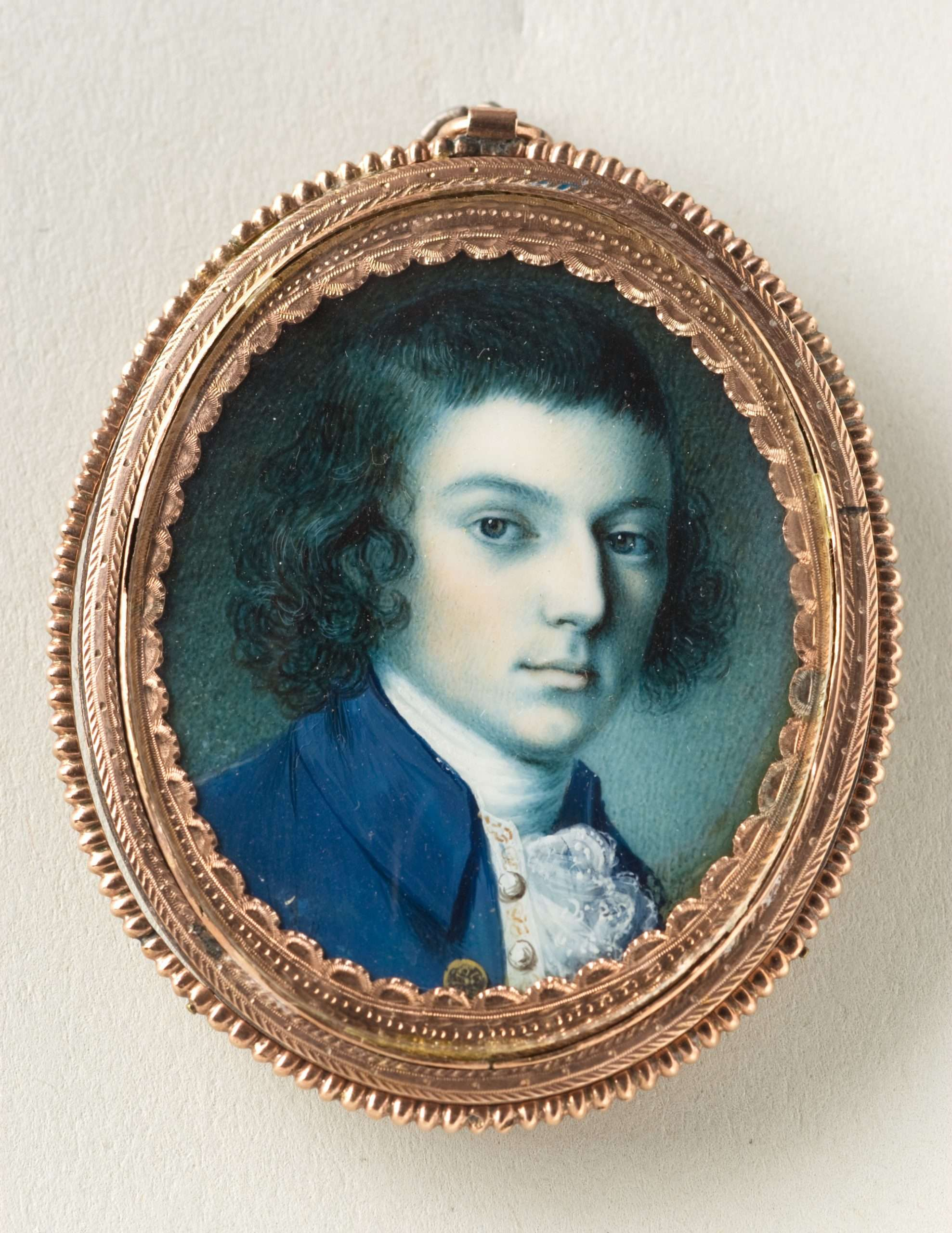
^{Mount Vernon Ladies' Association} Portrait of John Parke Custis by Charles Willson Peale, ca. 1774

In 1719, John Todd and Evan Thomas received a land grant within the area that is now the Nauck neighborhood. Robert Alexander later acquired the land. In 1778, Alexander sold his property to John Parke Custis, whereupon the land became part of Custis' Abingdon estate.

During the mid-1800s, Gustavus Brown Alexander owned much of the area that became Nauck, which at the time was called Green Valley African Americans began to purchase property and settle in the Nauck area during that period. Among the early African American property owners were Levi and Sarah Ann Jones.

In 1859, the Alexandria, Loudoun and Hampshire Railroad began operating to Vienna from a terminal in old town Alexandria. The rail line, which subsequently became branches of the Richmond and Danville Railroad, the Southern Railway, the Washington and Old Dominion Railway and the Washington and Old Dominion Railroad, eventually reached the town of Bluemont at the base of the Blue Ridge Mountains in 1900. The line, which traveled through the valley of Four Mile Run, had stations named Nauck and (later) Cowdon where it crossed Shirlington Road. Although the line carried freight until it closed in 1968, passenger service through Nauck ended in 1932 during the Great Depression.

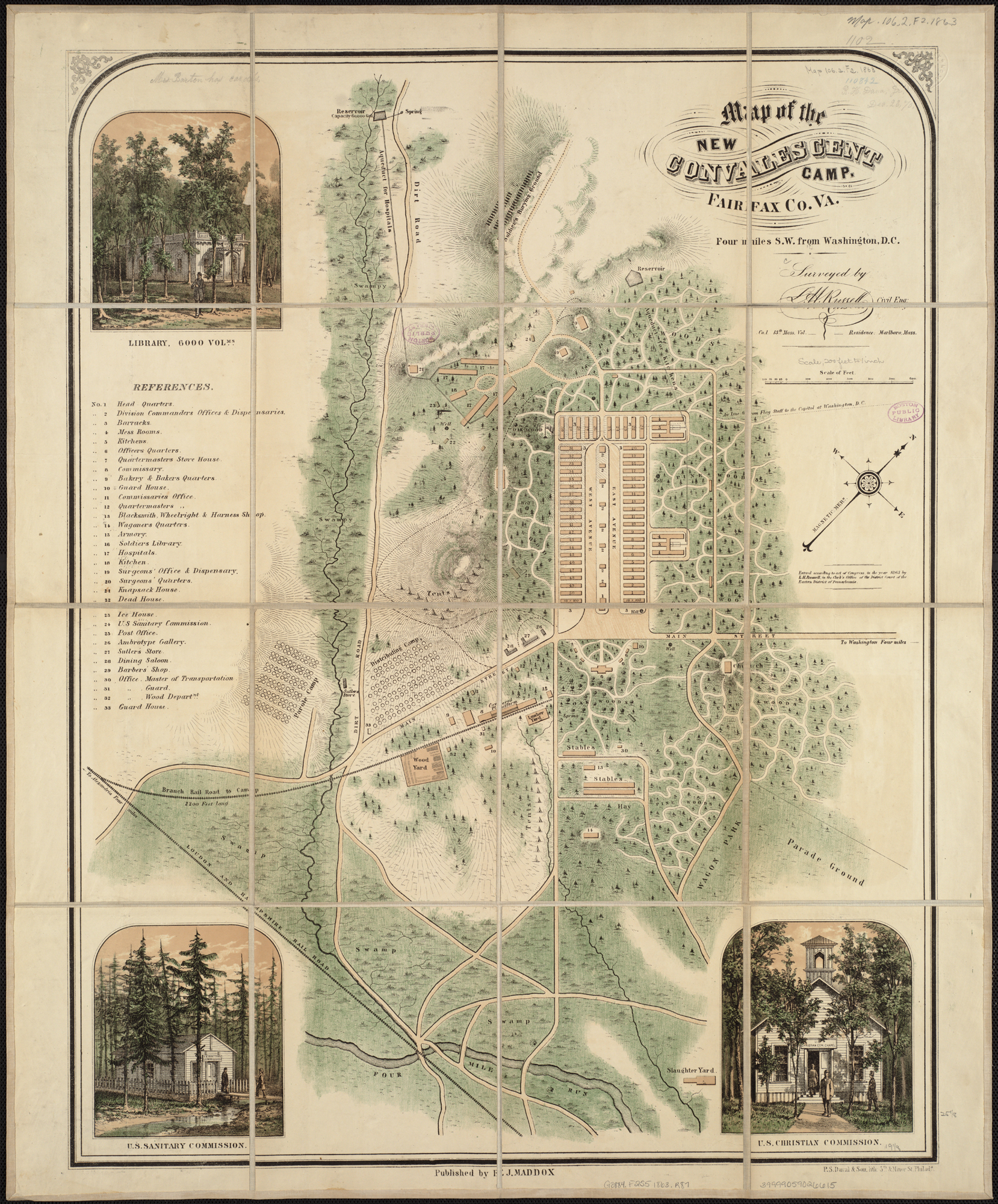
1863 map of Union Army convalescent camp in the area of the future Nauck neighborhood. The camp was north of Four Mile Run, a swamp, and the Alexandria, Loudoun and Hampshire Railroad.

During the American Civil War, the Union Army constructed Fort Barnard and other fortifications in the area. The army also established there a number of encampments for its troops, as well as a large convalescent camp bordered by a swamp. After the war ended in 1865, Thornton and Selina Gray, an African American couple that had earlier been slaves at Arlington House, purchased a small piece of property in the area in 1867.

During 1874–1875, John D. Nauck, a former Confederate Army soldier who had immigrated from Germany, purchased a 69 acres (28 ha) parcel of land in the area. Nauck, who held at least one political office in the area, lived on his property and subdivided and sold the remainder.

During the post-war period, the area attracted several African American families residing in Freedman's Village and other locations. In 1876, William Augustus Rowe, an African American who lived in Freedman's Village and was elected to a number of political positions, was among those who purchased property in the area during that period. In 1885, a "Map of the Town of Nauck, Alexandria County, Virginia" that resulted from an earlier land survey was recorded.

Nauck grew slowly during the late nineteenth century. In 1874, a congregation initially organized in Freedman's Village purchased land in the area on which to relocate a building containing an African Methodist Episcopal Zion Church, the Little Zion Church. The church's building housed a public school that was later known as the Kemper School. In 1885, the Alexandria County school board built a one-room school nearby. The board constructed a new two-story brick school in 1893 at South Lincoln Street. The board later replaced that building with a larger facility that now contains the Drew Model Elementary School.

In 1898, the Washington, Arlington & Falls Church Railway constructed a branch of its interurban electric trolley system that began in Rosslyn, connected with lines that traveled to downtown Washington, D.C. and other points, and terminated a short distance north of the Southern Railway's Nauck (Cowdon) station (see: Nauck line (Fort Myer line)). The line paralleled the present South Kenmore Street and stimulated the neighborhood's development. The trolley line's Nauck station was located south of Steuben Street (now 19th Street South).

However, the 1902 Virginia Constitution, which established racial segregation throughout the state and restricted the rights of African Americans, stopped the neighborhood's expansion. Property owners continued to subdivide their lands to accommodate more people, but Nauck's boundaries largely remained unchanged.

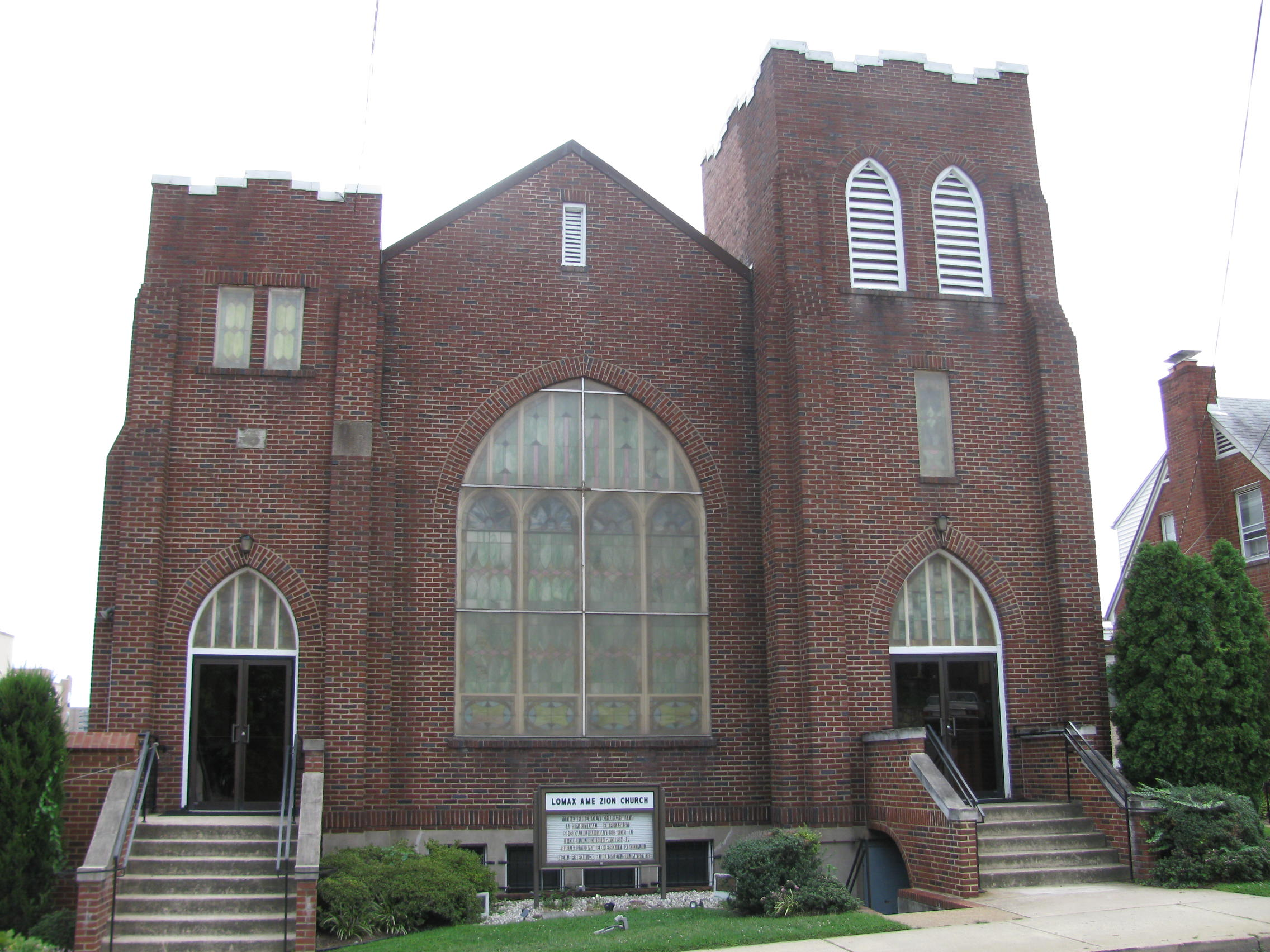
Lomax African Methodist Episcopal Zion Church (2012)

In 1922, the Lomax African Methodist Episcopal Zion Church was constructed on 24th Road South between South Glebe Road (Virginia State Route 120) to the east and Shirlington Road to the west. The church, which is a successor to the Little Zion Church, was added to the National Register of Historic Places in 2004.

During World War II, the federal government constructed Paul Dunbar Homes, an 11 acres (4 ha) segregated barracks-style wartime emergency low-income housing community for African Americans. The government built this affordable housing project on a parcel of land at Kemper Road and Shirlington Road that Levi Jones and his family had once owned.

Meanwhile, construction of The Pentagon and its surrounding roads during the war destroyed several older African American communities. Some of those communities' displaced residents relocated to Nauck, thus stimulating the neighborhood's development and increasing its African American population.

By 1952, few blocks in Nauck were still vacant. Others were built nearly to capacity. The neighborhood continued to develop during the remainder of the 20th century along the lines established many years earlier.

== Redevelopment ==
Gentrification is changing the character of the neighborhood. Developers have recently demolished many of Nauck's older houses and replaced them with larger homes because of increases in residential land values that the neighborhood experienced during the 2000s and 2010s. Recent residential redevelopment in the neighborhood has included the construction of the Townes of Shirlington, Shirlington Crest, and The Macedonian, an affordable housing project that tax exempt bonds from the Virginia Housing Development Authority and low-interest loans from the Arlington County government financed.

The land along Shirlington Road has been the target of major redevelopment in recent years. In 2004, the Arlington County Board adopted the Nauck Village Center Action Plan. The Action Plan covers the commercial core of Nauck, which is bounded by Glebe Road to the north, the bend in Shirlington Road to the south, and approximately one block east and west of Shirlington Road.

In 2011, Walmart expressed an interest in constructing a store near I-395 on Shirlington Road in Nauck. Walmart's plans fell through after the Arlington County Board amended the county's zoning ordinance to require County Board approval of such plans.

The Four Mile Run valley, within which the Washington and Old Dominion Railroad traveled through Nauck until 1968, is the last large area in Arlington County that still contains a concentration of properties zoned for industrial uses. In November 2018, the Arlington County Board adopted the Four Mile Run Valley Area Plan. The document addresses a number of planning issues that are intended to guide the future development of the area, including environmental sustainability, open space planning, building height, land use mix, urban design and transportation systems.

== Landmarks ==
In 2013, the Arlington County Board designated the Green Valley Pharmacy in Nauck as a local historic district. In 2014, the county's government held an unveiling ceremony for a historical marker that it had recently erected at the Pharmacy's site.

== Parks ==
Nauck Park, located at 2551 19th Street South, offers the neighborhood 0.32 acres (0.1 ha) of recreational space. The park contains restrooms, picnic tables and a school-age playground.

Drew Park is located at 2310 South Kenmore Street, adjacent to the Charles Drew Community Center. The park contains a playground, a basketball court, a baseball diamond and a sprayground.

Fort Barnard Park, located at 2101 South Pollard Street, occupies 5 acres (2.0 ha) of space near the Fort Barnard Community Garden. The park is across the street from the Fort Barnard Dog Park. The park has "fort"-themed play equipment, a mosaic and a hopscotch area. The park also contains a playground, picnic shelter, a baseball diamond and a basketball court. The park is located at the former site of Fort Barnard, a redoubt that the Union Army constructed during the autumn of 1861. The fortification, which was on the Arlington Line of forts, was an early component of the Civil War Defenses of Washington. Park landscaping has destroyed the last remnants of the fort.

Fort Barnard Heights Park, located at 2452 South Oakland Street, occupies 0.1 acres (0.040 ha). The park contains a picnic table, benches and open green space.

The Arlington County government has designated as "Four Mile Run Valley Park" an open space that contains Four Mile Run, the stream's riparian zones, and adjacent areas. The Valley Park straddles the southern border of the Nauck neighborhood. Two components of the Valley Park (Jennie Dean Park and the Shirlington Dog Park) are within Nauck. In September 2018, the Arlington County Board adopted a master plan and design guidelines for the Valley Park.

Nauck contains the trailhead of the 45-mile-long (72 km) Washington & Old Dominion Railroad Trail (W&OD Trail), which follows Four Mile Run through Arlington County as it travels northwest to the town of Purcellville in Loudoun County, Virginia. The trail is within NOVA Parks' Washington & Old Dominion Railroad Regional Park.

== Schools ==
Green Valley is home to Dr. Charles R. Drew Elementary School, which is part of Arlington Public Schools.

== Demographics ==
As of the 2010 Census, Green Valley's population was 35.9% non-Hispanic Black or African-American, 27.3% non-Hispanic White and 25.7% Hispanic or Latino.

== Neighborhood name ==
Around 1821, Anthony Frazer built on his 1,000 acres (405 ha) plantation a mansion named the "Green Valley Manor". The mansion was located at the present intersection of 23rd Street South and Arlington Ridge Road in Arlington County's Arlington Ridge neighborhood, east of I-395 and Nauck.

The neighborhood acquired the name of "Nauck" when John D. Nauck, a former Confederate Army soldier who was serving the county as a Justice of the Peace and in other positions, purchased, subdivided and sold 46 acres of farmland from 1874 to 1900, thus laying the foundation for its development. Nauck fled the area in 1891 when an African American in arrears to an installment payment for land that he had purchased from Nauck reportedly assaulted Nauck and threatened Nauck and his family when Nauck attempted to evict him from the land.

In February 2019, a neighborhood resident who had earlier headed the Arlington chapter of the National Association for the Advancement of Colored People (NAACP) circulated a letter that advocated a change in the Nauck Civic Association's name and area to Green Valley. The letter argued that the historically black neighborhood should no longer be named after a former Confederate soldier while stating that the writer had found no record or evidence linking Nauck to efforts to improve the quality of life for its residents. The letter further claimed that "the area was referred to as Green Valley from its inception in the 1700s to the 1970s".

The Civic Association then voted to change its name to the "Green Valley Civic Association". The association next asked the Arlington County Civic Federation to approve its proposed name change, which the Federation did during May 2019. Although the County government will change its relevant databases and maps to reflect the association's new name, the County Board has not voted to alter the name of the neighborhood itself.
