= Lomax African Methodist Episcopal Zion Church =

Historic church in Virginia, United States

- U.S. National Register of Historic Places
- Virginia Landmarks Register
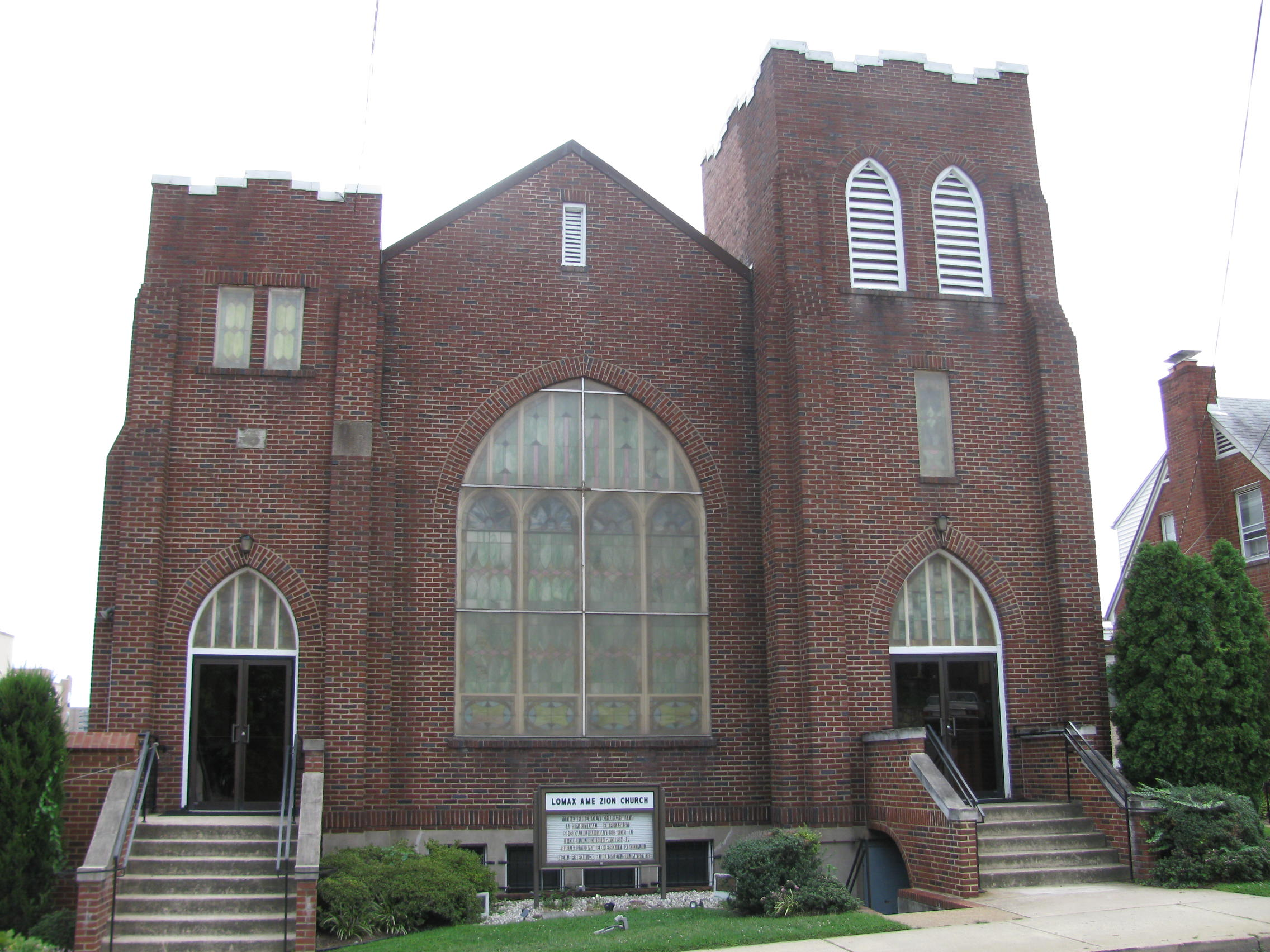
- Lomax African Methodist Episcopal Zion Church, September 2012

- Location within District of Columbia Location within Virginia Location within the United States
- Location: 2704 24th Rd. S, Arlington, Virginia
- Coordinates: 38°50′51″N 77°4′57″W
- Area: 1.8 acres (0.73 ha)
- Built: 1894, 1922
- Architect: West, Thomas; Gray, Leonard, et al.
- Architectural style: Late Gothic Revival
- NRHP reference No.: 04000038
- VLR No.: 000-1148

Significant dates
- Added to NRHP: February 11, 2004
- Designated VLR: December 3, 2003

Lomax African Methodist Episcopal Zion Church is an historic African Methodist Episcopal Zion church located at 2704 24th Rd. South in Arlington, Virginia. It was built in 1922, and is a one-story, three bay by six bay, brick church building on a parged concrete foundation. It features two unequal-sized crenellated towers and brick buttresses along the facade and side elevations in the Late Gothic Revival style. Also on the property are two contributing resources, including a cemetery dating from circa 1894, and a parsonage built in 1951. The cemetery contains approximately 107 interments.

It was listed on the National Register of Historic Places in 2004.
