= Cherrydale sit-ins =

1960 nonviolent protests in Arlington, Virginia

- Part of the Sit-in movement in the Civil Rights Movement
- George Lincoln Rockwell, other Nazi Party members, and hecklers confront Dion Diamond at Cherrydale Drug Fair on June 10. Reprinted with permission of the DC Public Library, Star Collection © Washington Post
- Date: June 9 – June 10 and June 18 – June 21, 1960
- Location: Cherrydale, Arlington County, Virginia
- Caused by: Racial segregation in public accommodations
- Result: Desegregation of lunch counters and businesses in Arlington County, Fairfax County, and Alexandria

Parties
Students and academics from: Howard University; Georgetown University; Cherrydale Drug Fair employee; Organizations involved: Nonviolent Action Group	Lunch counters at: Peoples Drug; Drug Fair; Howard Johnson's; Lansburgh's; F. W. Woolworth Company; Organizations involved: American Nazi Party

Lead figures
Nonviolent Action Group: Laurence Henry; Paul Dietrich	American Nazi Party: George Lincoln Rockwell

The Cherrydale sit-ins were non-violent protests that took place in Cherrydale, a neighborhood in Arlington County, Virginia, from June 9 to June 10, 1960. They were organized in opposition to Arlington County's racial segregation of African Americans, which existed in its businesses and residential communities during the Jim Crow era.

The sit-ins were planned by the Nonviolent Action Group (NAG), a student-run affiliate activist group of the Student Nonviolent Coordinating Committee (SNCC) at Howard University, and occurred primarily at the Peoples Drug and Cherrydale Drug Fair lunch counters. Participants were harassed during the two days by local high school students, agitators from across Northern Virginia, and members of the Arlington-based American Nazi Party, including their leader, George Lincoln Rockwell. Two protestors were arrested on June 10 for trespassing, and a car chase took place on the night of June 9 between six white high school students and two black men.

Arlington's business community eventually opened their services to black customers after more sit-ins between June 18 and June 21, making Arlington the first county in Virginia to desegregate their lunch counters, and the first county in the South where a chain restaurant served black customers. This then spread to Fairfax County and Alexandria, where business owners also chose to end their policies of segregation.

== History ==
=== Background and planning ===
As a municipality in the Southern United States, Arlington County had longstanding Jim Crow laws and policies that oppressed and segregated its African American community. These included racially restrictive housing covenants that prevented blacks and other minorities from purchasing properties in Arlington's suburbs that had boomed since the early 20th century, the demolition of historical black areas considered "slums" by county planners, and zoning ordinances that prohibited the construction of more affordable multi-family homes in black neighborhoods. Consequently, most black people in the county were concentrated in several segregated neighborhoods established between the 1840s and 1900, including Johnson's Hill, Halls Hill, and Green Valley. Halls Hill itself had been deliberately separated from white neighborhoods with a seven-foot cinderblock wall built by white residents during the 1930s.

Civil rights activism against these practices had increased substantially since the 1940s with the formation of Arlington's NAACP chapter and the rise in the county's federal worker population, many of whom were highly educated professionals with more liberal politics than the county's traditional white community. Racist hate groups such as the American Nazi Party, founded in Arlington by George Lincoln Rockwell in 1958, and Arlington's Ku Klux Klan, which had declined since its peak in the 1920s, emerged in opposition to Arlington's increasing liberalism. Arlington also had a chapter of the Defenders of State Sovereignty and Individual Liberties to stop the racial integration of county schools following the 1954 Brown v. Board of Education ruling, which was part of former Virginia governor and Senator Harry F. Byrd and Representative James M. Thomson's segregationist massive resistance campaign. Despite aggressive pushback from these groups, the eventual racial integration of Stratford Junior High School on February 2, 1959, although tense, occurred without violent resistance and was deemed "the day nothing happened" by the Anti-Defamation League.

Meanwhile, the sit-in movement, which started on February 1, 1960, with the initiation of protests at the Woolworth's lunch counter in Greensboro, North Carolina, had inspired students and activists across the United States to stage similar demonstrations. The recently formed Nonviolent Action Group (NAG), a Student Nonviolent Coordinating Committee (SNCC)-affiliated civil rights organization at Howard University, sought to lead their own sit-in protest to push for desegregation in the Washington region.

On June 7, 1960, NAG leaders Laurence Henry and Paul Dietrich, along with fellow activists Dion Diamond and Joan Trumpauer Mulholland, held a meeting to plan the sit-in with 20 other students in a dorm room on the Howard University campus. Over half were enrolled at Howard, while several others, including white students, came from other regional universities. Arlington was chosen as an ideal target for the protest given its increasingly liberal political tendencies, which NAG believed would make Arlington's desegregation more feasible. The relative peace associated with Stratford Junior High School's racial integration in 1959 further supported this perspective.

=== June 9 ===
At 1:15 pm, a multiracial group of 13 sit-in participants began their protest at the Peoples Drug lunch counter on 4709 Lee Highway, including Henry, Dietrich, Diamond, and Trumpauer. They were refused service by store manager Wayne Howard, who proceeded to close the lunch counter while not pressing any charges. This prevented the Arlington County police, who arrived shortly after the sit-in began, from making any arrests, as Virginia law, while requiring separation of races at public gatherings, did not specifically prevent racially integrated groups from sharing meals. Others joined after hearing about the protest on local radio.

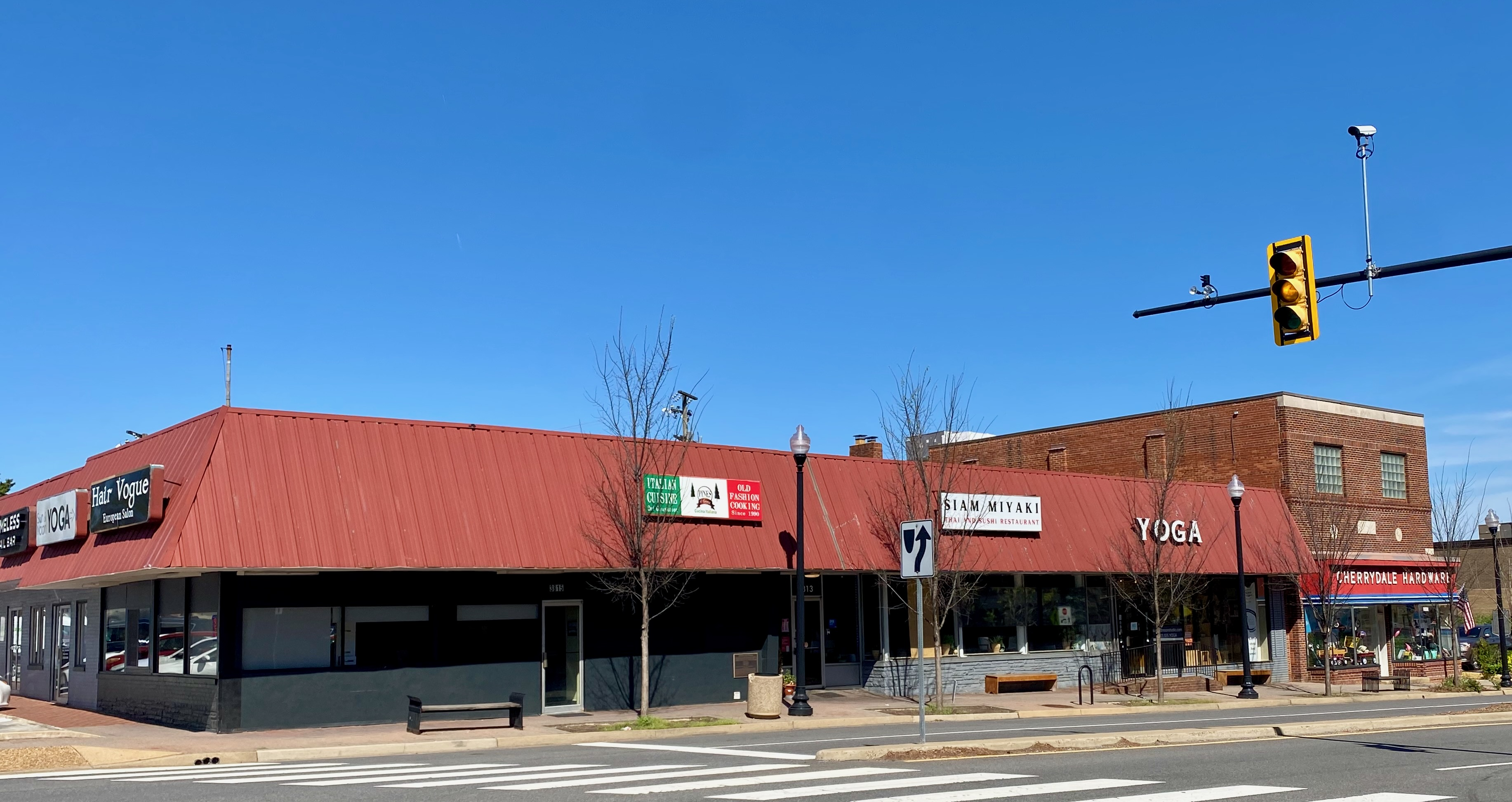
Cherrydale Drug Fair building where the sit-ins took place

Six protesters, including Henry, Diamond, Trumpauer, and David Hartsough, split off from the Peoples Drug sit-in at 2:15 pm and walked to Cherrydale Drug Fair further down Lee Highway. Arlington County police were stationed outside the Drug Fair in full riot gear, likely indicating they had received a tip in advance about the sit-in. The Drug Fair store manager also closed the lunch counter after the activists arrived, but like at Peoples Drug, did not press any charges.

I've heard that term, 'nigger', so much in the last few days—more than I've ever heard it before. But I kept thinking that if I struck back, I'd be defeating my purpose. I'm just trying to be a Christian and to use the teachings of Christ as an example.

— Dion Diamond, The Washington Post

A crowd of white onlookers began forming at Cherrydale Drug Fair, including Nazi Party members, who held signs with racist caricatures that were in favor of racial segregation and white supremacy. Local high school students, who had heard about the sit-in from Nazi Party members handing out flyers near school campuses, joined the crowd after the end of the school day at 3 pm. Many were angry at the closure of the lunch counter, which was frequented often after school hours, while others were more supportive of the Civil Rights cause or hostile to the Nazi counter-protesters. The protesters sat quietly at the lunch counter throughout, reading from the Bible and other literature while answering questions from the crowd and journalists. Joseph Wooten, a black porter at the Drug Fair, joined the sit-in around 3:30 pm.

Hostility towards the sit-ins increased later in the afternoon and evening as white agitators from throughout Northern Virginia began arriving to harass the protesters. Sit-in participants endured verbal abuse and violence, particularly at the Cherrydale Drug Fair, where they were punched, jabbed, and taunted with racial slurs by the crowd. American Nazi Party leader George Lincoln Rockwell stopped at Peoples Drug at 7:30 pm, where he made racist and antisemitic insults towards the protesters. He and several associates then moved to the Cherrydale Drug Fair at 9:30 pm, where they further verbally and physically abused protesters and lunch counter staff. After 10 minutes, police cleared the Drug Fair of everyone but the sit-in participants and threatened Rockwell with arrest if he entered the store again.

Around eight protesters at Peoples Drug moved to the Cherrydale Drug Fair at 9:30 pm, where an angry mob of 300 white people had gathered. A local pastor from Halls Hill, James Eugene Browne Sr., had earlier promised to safely transport the activists back to Washington after the Drug Fair closed at 10 pm, and he threatened the crowd with violence if any of them were harmed. Police then escorted all the protesters, who were surrounded by journalists and photographers, out of the store. Browne and his compatriots were parked nearby in the Drug Fair parking lot. They were followed on their drive back to Washington; several black men chased and fired shots at one car down North 26th Street, which was full of white teenagers that had been at the Drug Fair earlier in the evening.

=== June 10 ===
NAG resumed the sit-ins at 12:05 pm on June 10, and expanded the protest to another Drug Fair near North Harrison Street and a Howard Johnson's restaurant. Activists moved between the four sit-in locations throughout the day. While bystanders at Peoples Drug and the North Harrison Street Drug Fair were more encouraging of the sit-ins, hostilities from white hecklers and students continued at the Cherrydale Drug Fair. Rockwell returned with Nazi Party members in the afternoon to again harass the protesters, who, along with the rest of the agitators, were cleared out of the store by police around 3:30 pm. Henry and Diamond were arrested at the Howard Johnson's later in the afternoon.

After meeting in the evening to discuss next steps, the protesters decided to pause the sit-ins and demand a mediated session about ending segregation with the county board, business owners, and community members. County Board Chairman Herbert L. Brown Jr. argued that the county government had no legal standing to force businesses to desegregate. He nonetheless believed that "stores which already serve Negroes at their other counters should certainly consider desegregating their eating facilities", as chains like Peoples and Drug Fair already served black customers in Washington and Maryland.

=== Resumed protests and desegregation ===
The sit-ins continued starting on June 18 at the Woolworth's and Lansburgh's lunch counters in Shirlington. Business owners relented with the threat of further demonstrations, and began desegregating on June 22. Subsequently, most chain stores in Arlington, Fairfax County, and Alexandria desegregated their lunch counters. This included Hot Shoppes, which represented the first racial integration of a restaurant more formal than a lunch counter. As a result, Arlington County became the first county in the South to desegregate its lunch counters, and the first county where a restaurant chain served black customers.

== Legacy and commemoration ==
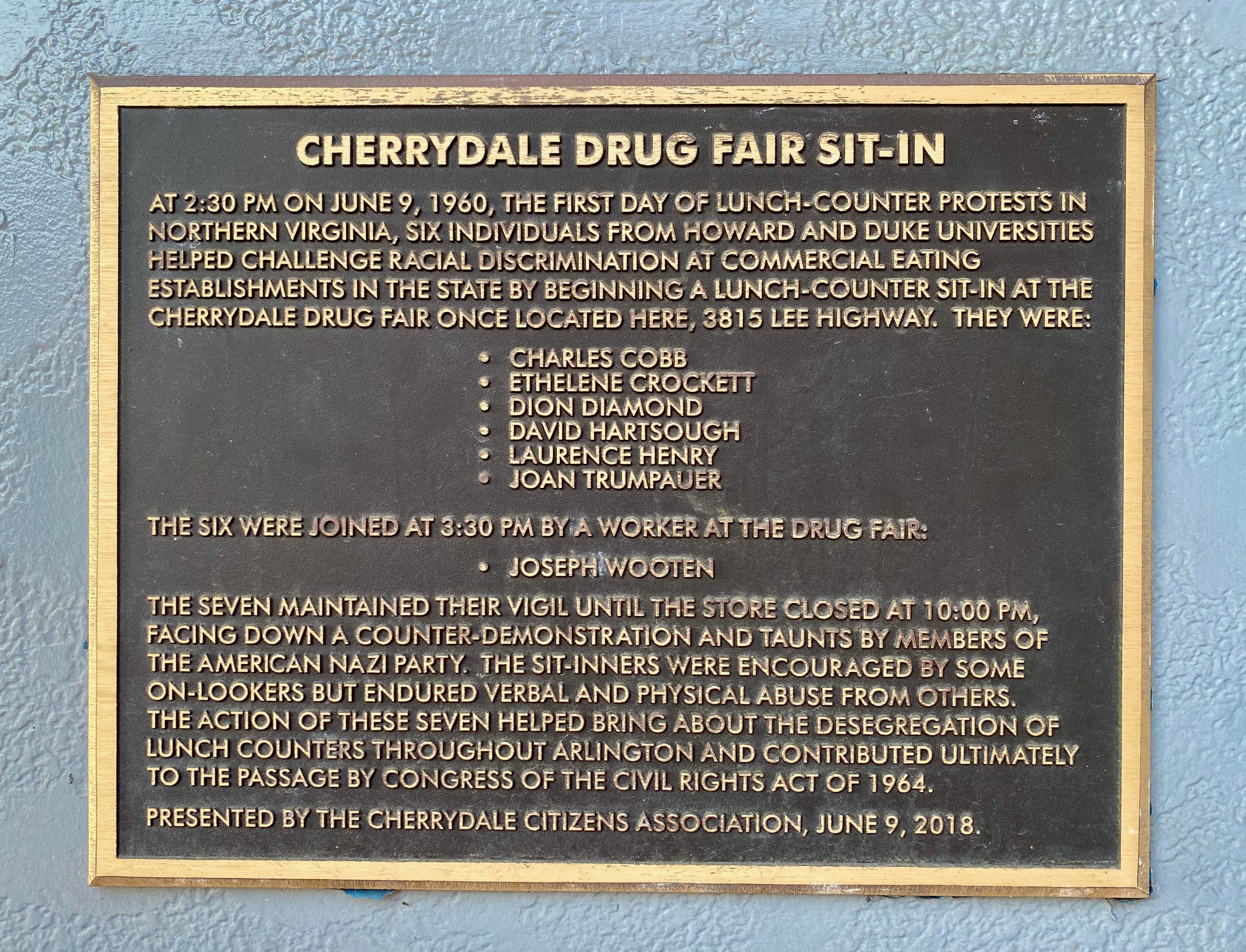
Commemorative plaque at former Drug Fair location

Heavy media coverage of the Cherrydale sit-ins by newspapers, including the Washington Post and the Washington Star, greatly contributed to the protest's effectiveness through the heightened contrast depicted between the non-violent, calm activists and aggressive, crude segregationists and Nazi Party members. This coverage, as well as those of protests throughout the country that were part of the larger sit-in movement, were critical in influencing political leaders to prioritize racial integration and civil rights, culminating in the passing of the Civil Rights Act of 1964.

The NAG itself, after their victory in Arlington, continued leading civil rights activism in the Washington metropolitan area during the early 1960s, some of which saw further encounters with Rockwell and his American Nazi Party. This included months-long demonstrations at the then-whites only Glen Echo Park, which they successfully pressured into opening to all races in March 1961 after an intervention by US Attorney General Robert F. Kennedy.

To honor the Cherrydale sit-ins and their significance in Arlington County history, the Cherrydale Citizens Association commissioned a bronze commemorative plaque to be installed at the former location of the Cherrydale Drug Fair. It was dedicated in a ceremony on July 28, 2018, that included Dion Diamond, Ethelene Crockett Jones, and Joan Trumpauer Mulholland, who were among the six protesters that started the sit-in at the Drug Fair on June 9, 1960.

== See also ==
- Alexandria Library sit-in
- Sit-in movement

== Bibliography ==
- Bestebreurtje, Lindsey (2024). Built by the People Themselves: African American Community Development in Arlington, Virginia, from the Civil War through Civil Rights. Columbia: The University of South Carolina Press. ISBN 978-1-64336-498-8.
- Embree, Gregory J. (2022). "The Cherrydale Drug Fair Sit-In, 9–10 June 1960: An Arlington Neighborhood's Brush with History". The Virginia Magazine of History and Biography. 130 (2): 124–150.
