= High View Park =

Hall's Hill-High View Park, Arlington, Virginia
- Neighborhood
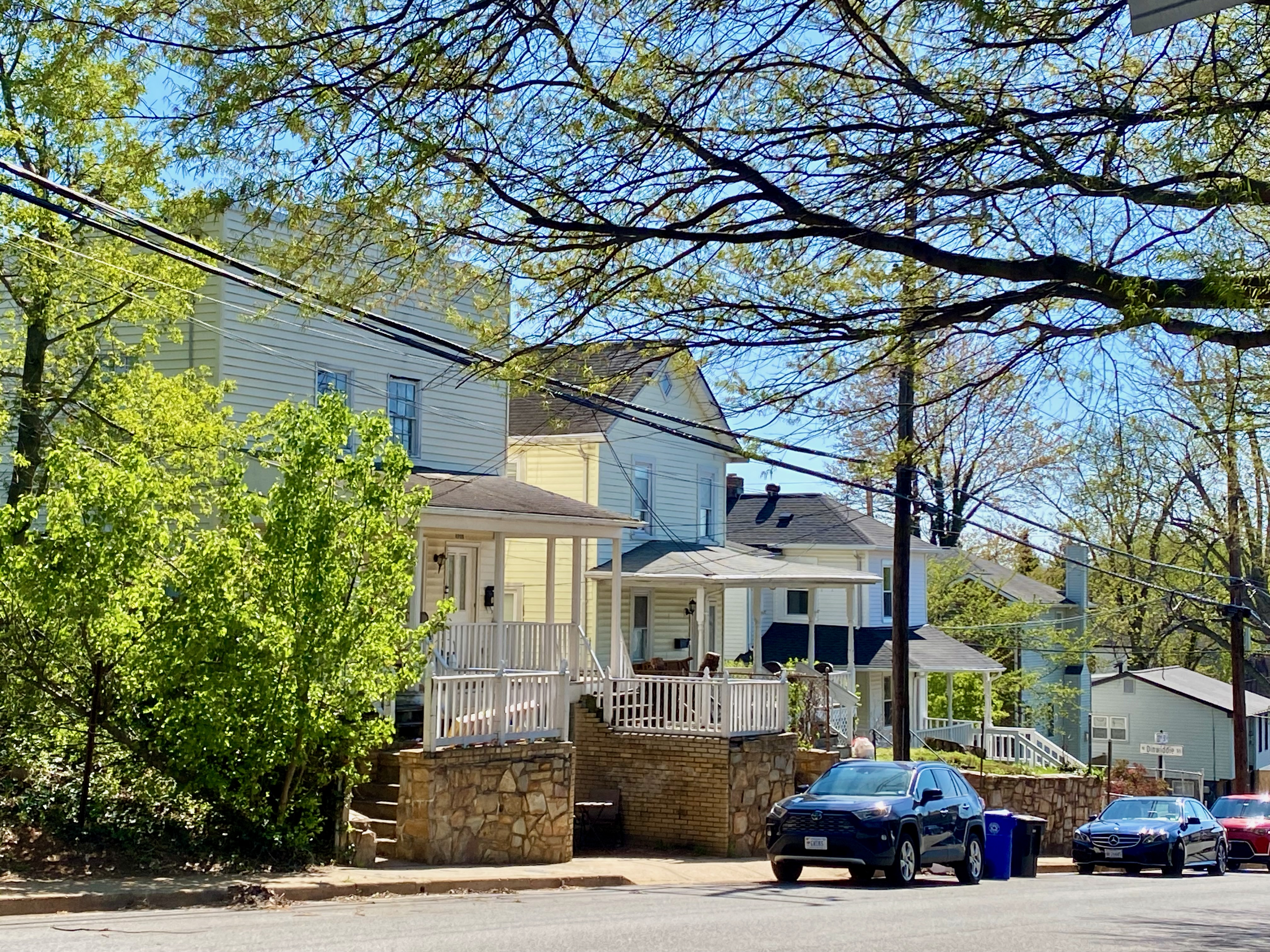
- Houses along 22nd Street
- Interactive map of Hall's Hill-High View Park, Arlington, Virginia
- Coordinates: 38°53′13″N 77°8′22″W
- Country: United States of America
- State: Virginia
- County: Arlington
- Time zone: UTC-5 (Eastern (EST))
  - Summer (DST): UTC-4 (EDT)
- ZIP codes: 22207
- Area code: 703/571

Hall's Hill, also known as High View Park, is a historically black neighborhood in northern Arlington, Virginia. It is roughly bounded by North George Mason Drive, 16th Street North, North Edison Street, 17th Road North, North Culpeper Street, and North Dinwiddie Street.

Hall's Hill originated shortly after the Civil War, when local farmer Bazil Hall began selling plots of his former plantation to recently emancipated enslaved people from around the region. By the turn of the 20th century, Hall's Hill had developed into a small suburb of Washington along the Washington & Old Dominion Railroad (W&OD) commuter trolley line. Throughout the Jim Crow era, Hall's Hill was one of several racially segregated African American settlements in Arlington County where blacks were permitted to live. A wall was built by adjacent white neighborhoods that surrounded Hall's Hill during the 1930s to further enforce its racial segregation.

The Civil rights movement, which many Hall's Hill residents participated in, relieved Hall's Hill and Arlington's other black enclaves of this Jim Crow regime, giving way to greater racial integration and diversity. Since the late 20th century, Hall's Hill has undergone gentrification as developers have replaced the neighborhood's smaller historic structures with larger, more expensive single-family homes, causing a decline in its historical black population as property values and cost of living have risen. Several historic sites, including the old 1930s wall and the late 19th century Calloway Cemetery, have been commemorated with historic markers and designated as local historic districts by Arlington County.

== History ==
=== Bazil Hall's farm ===
On December 13, 1850, Bazil Hall, a former whaler born in Washington, purchased a 327-acre farm from Richard Smith in what was then Alexandria County. The land itself was part of the estate of former Washington mayor John Peter Van Ness, which Smith was managing following Van Ness's death in 1846. Hall named the land the "Hall Homestead Tract" and settled there with his wife Elizabeth, originally from New York, and their two sons. He later built the family home on a 400-foot high hill on the property that he named "Hall's Hill". Hall cultivated a variety of produce with enslaved labor on about 125 acres of his land; the rest was forested.

Hall and his family were notorious among their contemporaries for being cruel to their enslaved servants and laborers; at one point, Hall had allegedly shot one in "bravado". Enslaved workers were recorded by the Washington Star as having intentionally burned some of Hall's farm buildings. Hall's wife Elizabeth was murdered by enslaved woman Jenny Farr on December 14, 1857, after which he attempted to shoot the accused murderer before she was sent to jail.

=== Civil War ===
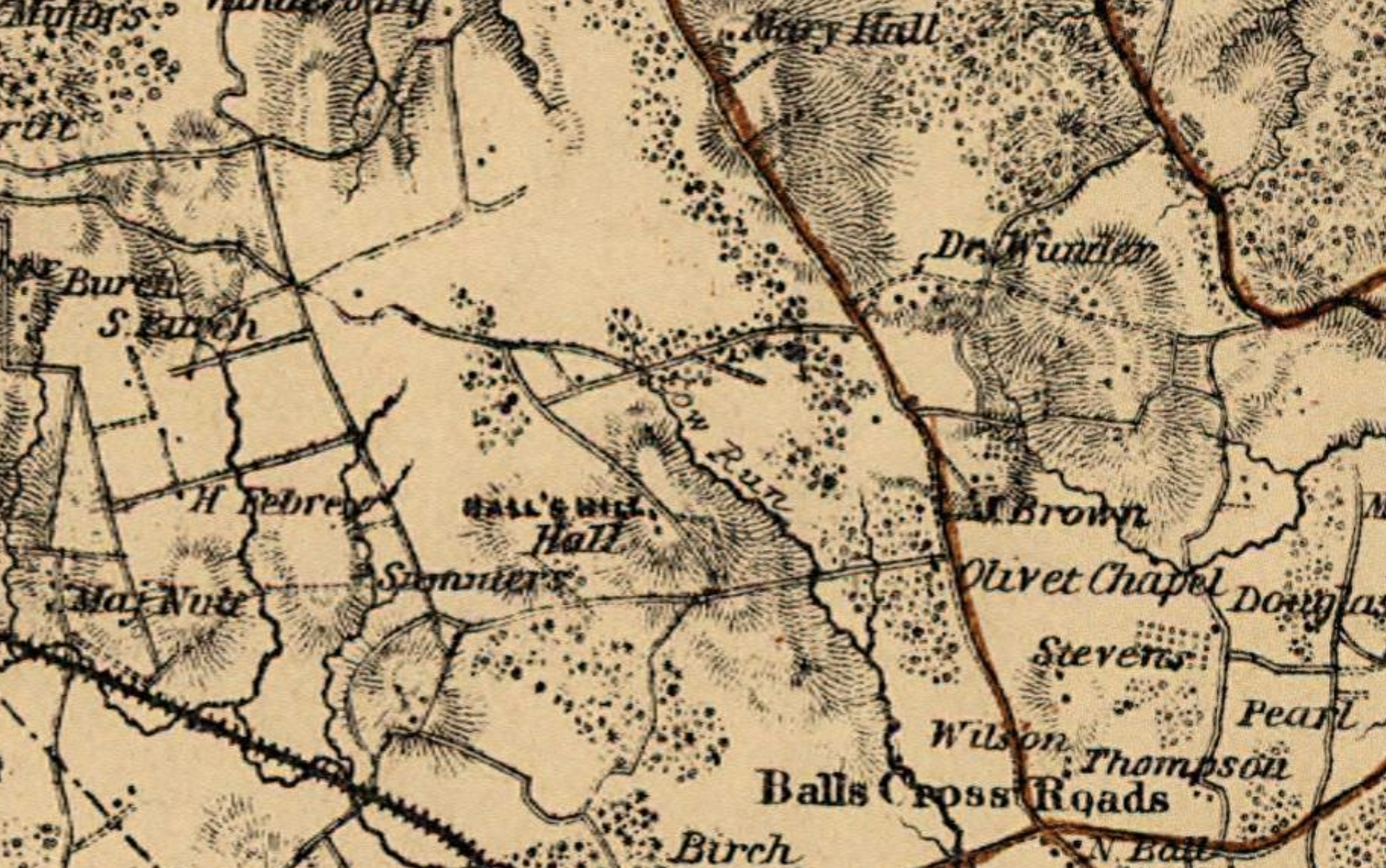
Hall's Hill and surrounding area in 1865. Mary Hall's estate is located to the northeast. Ball's Crossroads, today known as Ballston, is to the southeast

During the Civil War, Hall was a supporter of the Union, and one of the few in Alexandria County to vote against Virginia's secession in 1861. Despite this, Hall was a steadfast believer in the institution of slavery, proclaiming to Union soldiers that "any man of common sense will say that slavery is the very best thing for the South." Hall's property saw some action in August 1861, when skirmishes between Union forces and the Confederate contingent at nearby Munson's Hill clashed. Confederates on Upton's Hill in Fairfax County shelled Hall's Hill and later burned his house and barn; Hall and his family were driven from the property during the battle. Union cavalry successfully pushed back the Confederate force. Following this engagement, Union forces encamped on Hall's Hill during the winter of 1861-1862, clearing existing trees to improve their visibility of Upton's Hill and using nearby Lubber Run for fresh water. For the rest of the war, Hall stayed in his sister Mary's summer residence on North Glebe Road, working as a logger under the Union army to chop wood in Arlington Heights.

=== Foundation of neighborhood ===
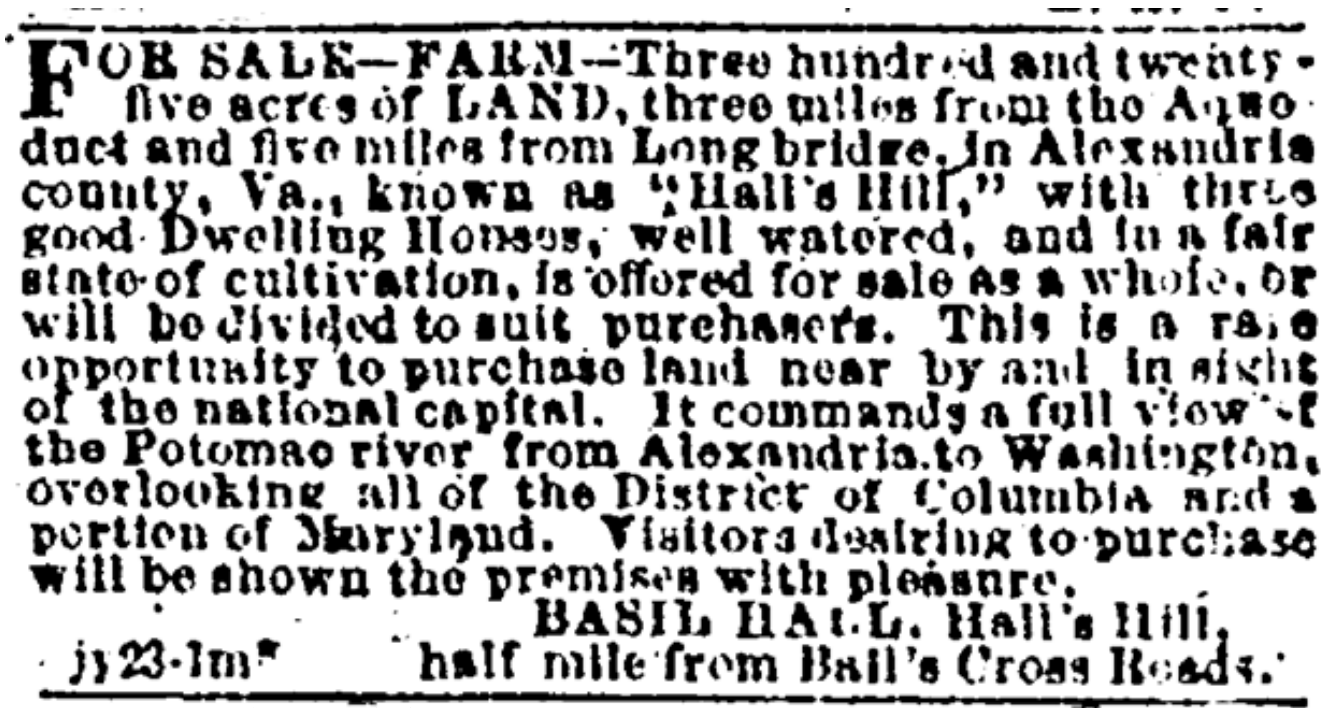
Ad from the Evening Star featuring Hall's Hill, 1872

By the end of the war, Hall's farm had been largely destroyed after years of Union occupation. He applied for compensation through the Southern Claims Commission, for which he received $10,729.68 on June 15, 1872; he had originally sought 4 times that amount. Financially ruined, Hall started selling parcels of his farm at a loss to former slaves from rural Virginia and Maryland. These early residents found work in nearby farms, as well as in Washington as domestic servants and laborers, which was made possible by the W&OD Railway stop located nearby that offered commuter trolley services. This community took on the name of Hall's Hill after the elevation Bazil had named over a decade earlier, and became Arlington's second African American neighborhood established after Freedman's Village.

The character of early Hall's Hill was semi-rural, with many owning larger lots where they engaged in farming and animal husbandry to supplant their income. By 1868, the community's first church and a one-room schoolhouse had been established. Hall's Hill was isolated from other black settlements in Arlington, such as Green Valley and Freedman's Village in Arlington's southern half. Beyond Langston Boulevard, then known as Georgetown and Fairfax Road and Hall's Hill's main thoroughfare, the neighborhood's dirt roads did not connect well with the broader Arlington road network, which may have been to intentionally insulate the community from white farmers in the surrounding region.

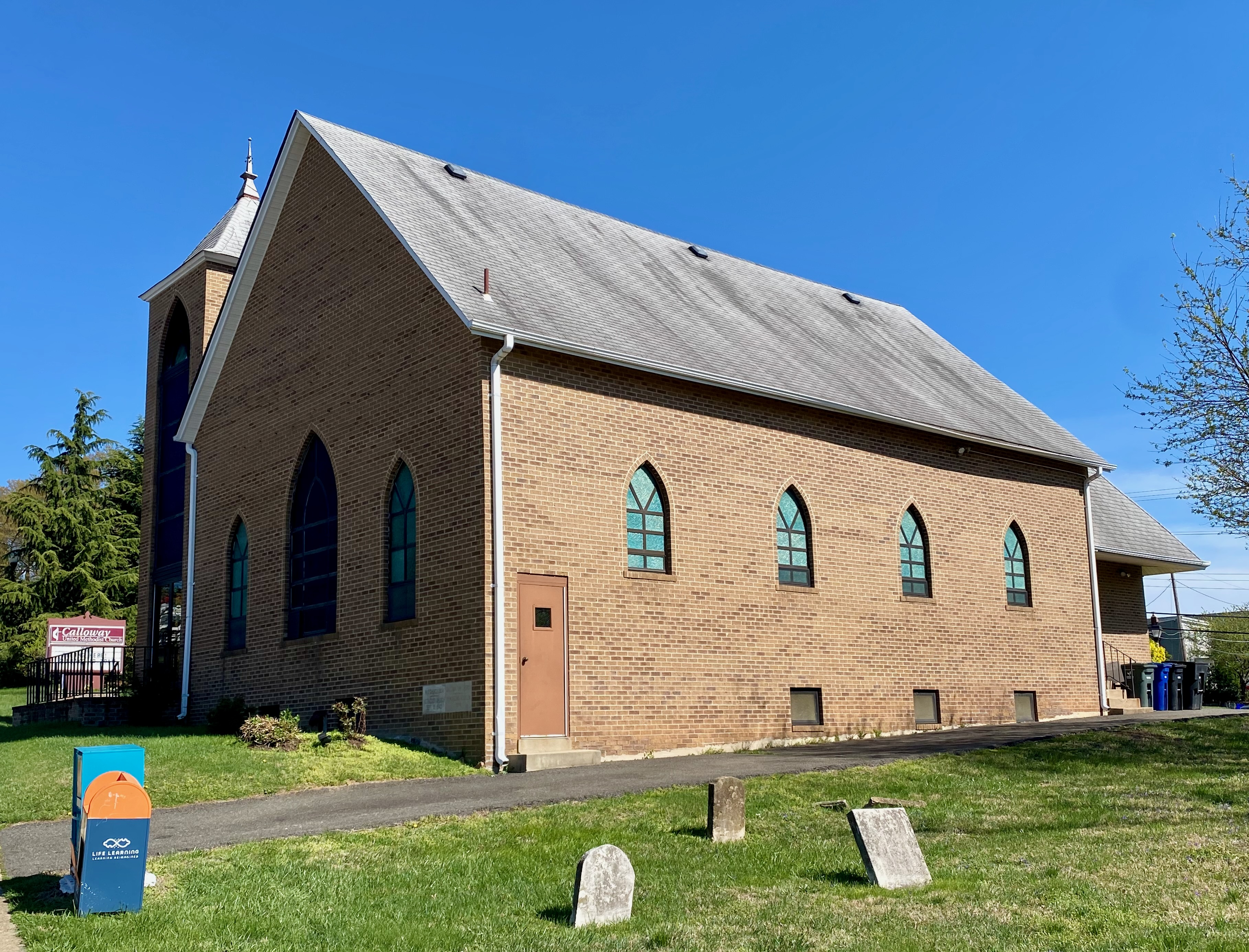
Calloway Church and cemetery. The present church building was constructed in 1904 and renovated several times between 1940 and 1979.

Throughout the rest of the 19th century, more black migrants settled in Hall's Hill, and a greater level of density was enabled by the division of larger lots into smaller landholdings. The 49-acre High View Park subdivision was platted to the south of Hall's Hill in 1892, by which time the neighborhood had 2 churches, an Odd Fellows hall, and 2 stores. Calloway Cemetery, which dates from this period and is the oldest known church-affiliated African American graveyard in Arlington County, was listed as a local historic district in 2012.

=== Jim Crow era ===
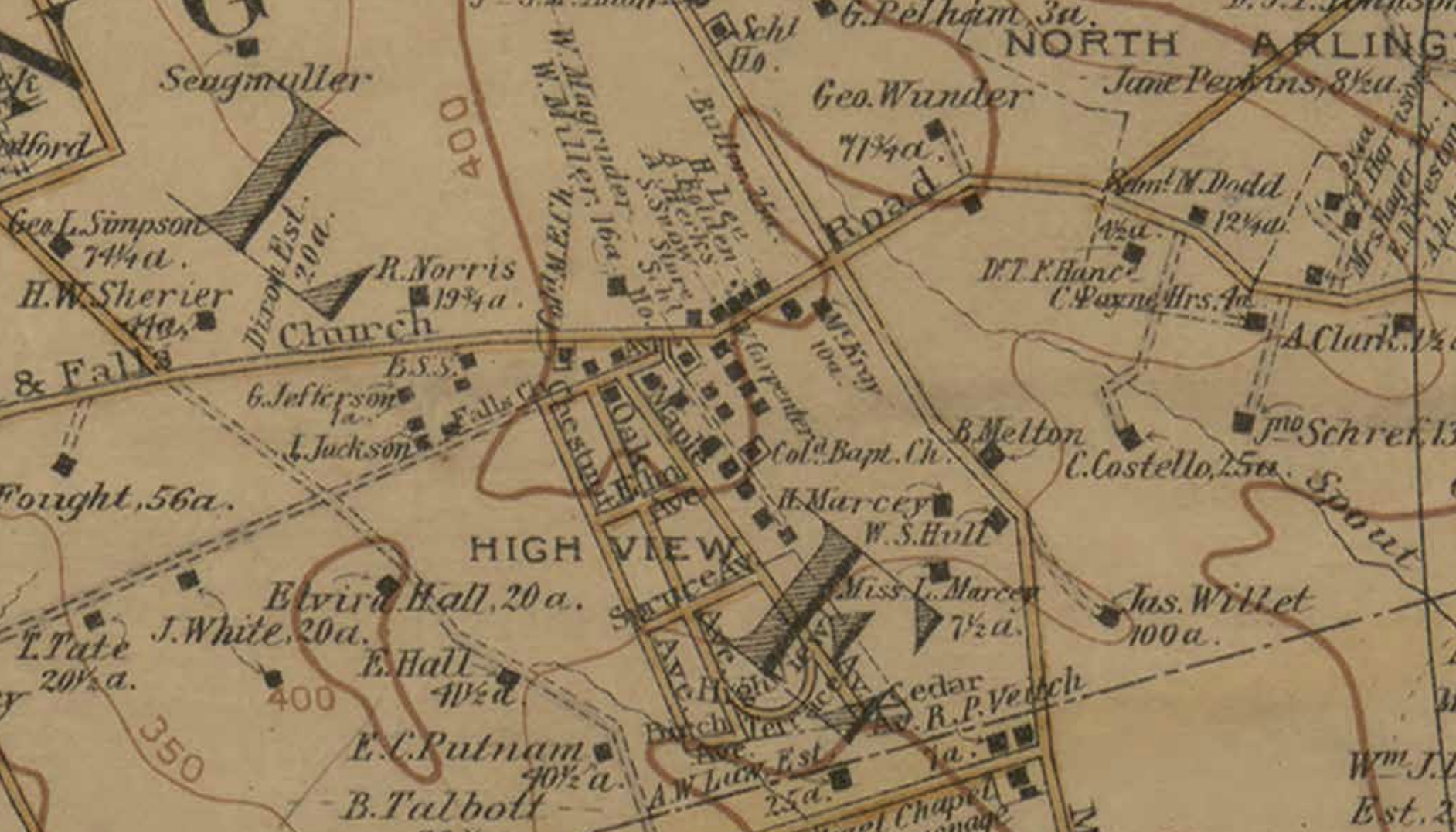
Map of Hall's Hill in 1894. Squares represent buildings

The expansion of commuter rail service in Arlington from 1870 to 1900 stimulated suburban development throughout the county, which centered around stops along the growing trolley network. This occurred during the rise of Jim Crow laws in post-Reconstruction Arlington that instituted a wide range of restrictions on the economic mobility and freedom of Hall's Hill's black residents.

Many of these policies were pushed by developers and boosters including Crandal Mackey and Frank Lyon, whose Southern Progressive agenda and Good Citizens League organization defined Arlington's politics around the turn of the century. League members conducted "clean up" raids on saloons and gambling halls, most infamously in the interracial neighborhood of Rosslyn in 1904, participated in the Virginia Constitutional Convention of 1901–02 that disenfranchised black voters through poll taxes, and developed white suburban subdivisions via racially restrictive housing covenants. The 1896 Plessy v. Ferguson U.S. Supreme Court decision that legalized "separate but equal" racial segregation enabled the Virginia Assembly to pass zoning ordinances in 1912 that created "segregation districts" throughout the state, which were adopted in Arlington. While these eventually struck down by the 1917 Buchanan v. Warley decision, county planners and developers restricted the growth of black neighborhoods in other ways, including through Arlington's 1930 zoning ordinance that prevented further construction of more affordable multifamily housing in black communities.

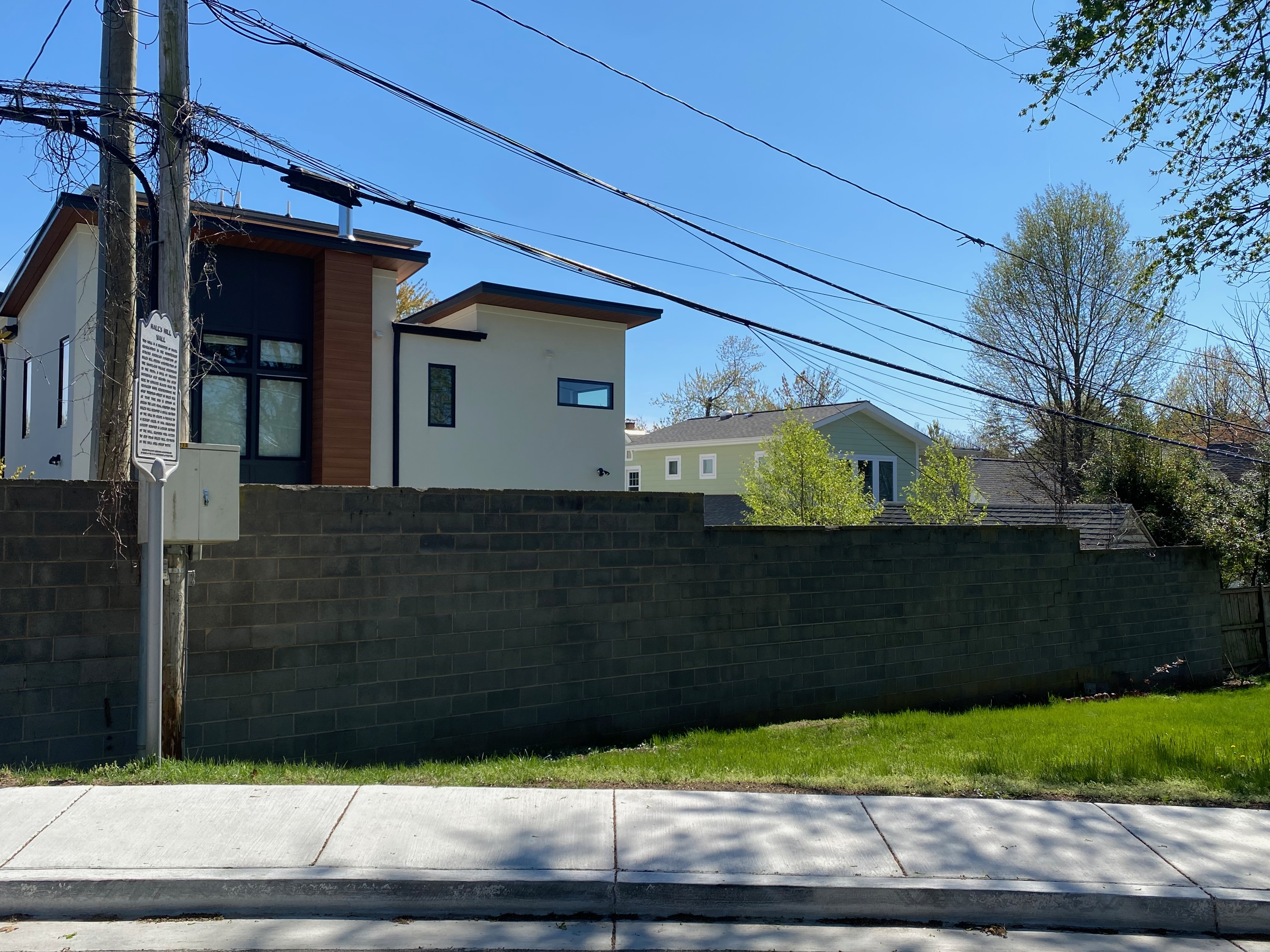
Preserved section of the 1930 wall separating Hall's Hill from surrounding whites-only neighborhoods

The effect of these Jim Crow-era policies on Hall's Hill was an increase in land values, as African Americans from across the county concentrated within the few areas they were permitted to live. New arrivals in the 1920s began building more affordable shotgun shack homes that were better adapted to increasingly smaller lot sizes. The county government also did not provide Hall's Hill with the same level of services and infrastructure improvements as white neighborhoods; roads remained unpaved and without street lamps. Furthermore, the 1930 zoning law allowed Arlington homeowners to build high walls in their backyards, which the adjacent white neighborhoods of Fostoria and Waycroft used to physically segregate themselves from Hall's Hill through the construction of a 7-foot tall cinderblock wall that enveloped the entire Hall's Hill community. Arlington's Ku Klux Klan (KKK) members were known to intimidate Hall's Hill residents during this period through marches, cross burnings, and car convoys to drive down black turnout during county elections.

Despite these burdens and inequalities, the Hall's Hill community organized their own services and supportive infrastructure, including Arlington's first dedicated fire station, homemade street lanterns, and a black-owned bus line during the 1920s and 1930s which provided safer travel than Arlington's segregated, racially hostile public buses. Black fraternal organizations including the Improved Benevolent and Protective Order of Elks of the World, Grand United Order of Odd Fellows in America, and Freemasons enabled Hall's Hill residents to campaign for Arlington political offices before Arlington's 1930 change to an at-large voting system, which intentionally diluted black voting power and favored expanding white suburbs. Hall's Hill's neighborhood association, the John M. Langston Citizens Association, was established in 1924 to keep residents informed about any threats presented by county zoning and planning policies.

=== Civil Rights era ===
The New Deal period and World War II brought a large influx of Federal workers to Arlington and spurred rapid development of existing neighborhoods. This further increased land values in Hall's Hill and Arlington's other black communities, attracting real estate speculators and developers that sought to replace them with white neighborhoods. Pelham Town, a black subdivision close to Hall's Hill that was platted in 1890, was completely bought up by developers during the 1930s and 1940s; many former Pelham Town residents moved to Hall's Hill, which by 1950 was overcrowded. This was worsened by the expansion of adjacent white suburbs, which had decreased the land available to black residents by three-fifths since the 1860s.

Population growth also fundamentally altered Arlington's politics. Its traditional Southern Democratic political establishment, which favored racial segregation and consisted of Southerners in the mold of Mackey and Lyon, was gradually replaced with more liberal, New Deal Democrats and white moderate figures. This coincided with rising Civil Rights activism in Arlington, reflected in the establishment of its NAACP branch in 1940 and Green Valley resident Jessie Butler's legal challenge to Virginia's poll tax in 1949.

Challenges to the country's broader racial segregation, most notably in the 1954 Brown v. Board of Education U.S. Supreme Court ruling that struck down "separate but equal" segregation under Plessy v. Ferguson, instigated Virginia's massive resistance program against racial integration in schooling under Senator Harry F. Byrd. Racist hate groups, including George Lincoln Rockwell's American Nazi Party and the county's KKK, also rose in opposition to the dismantling of Arlington's racial segregation.

The NAACP and three Hall's Hill residents' 1956 suit against Arlington's segregation in schooling initiated an extended legal fight that lasted until February 2, 1959, when Stratford Junior High School in Cherrydale was racially integrated with the admission of four black Hall's Hill students. The integration, while tense, occurred with relative peace and was dubbed "The Day Nothing Happened" in the local press. In 1960, the Cherrydale sit-ins organized by the Nonviolent Action Group at Howard University resulted in the desegregation of Arlington businesses, and with the passing of the Civil Rights Act of 1968, de jure racial housing discrimination in Arlington was officially outlawed.

=== Post-Civil Rights era to present ===
Community activism and engagement with Arlington County planners saw off several attempts to replace Hall's Hill with high-rise apartments and healthcare facilities during the 1960s. Further pressure on the county government resulted in Hall's Hill being included in Arlington's first Neighborhood Conservation Plan in 1965, providing Hall's Hill which public services and infrastructure improvements that it had been previously denied. During Hall's Hill's incorporation into the plan, county planners changed the name of the neighborhood to High View Park after the 1892 subdivision. Despite this, many residents continue to refer to it as Hall's Hill.

The dismantling of Arlington's segregation following the successes of the Civil Rights movement enabled greater racial integration and diversity, which increased substantially between the 1970s and 1980s; members of longstanding Hall's Hill black families were also able to move elsewhere in the county and beyond. Issues with drugs and violent crime also arose during this time, and increasing cost of living in Arlington caused some in Hall's Hill to fall into poverty. As a result, Hall's Hill remained relatively affordable compared to other areas of Arlington that, following the arrival of the Washington Metro in 1979, were urbanizing and becoming more affluent.

Through the 1990s and into the 21st century, Hall's Hill has attracted developers that have gradually replaced many of its historic buildings with high-end single family homes, contributing to increasing property values and a decline in its black community, which fell from 90% of Hall's Hill's population in 1990 to 22% in 2021. Many former black residents have sold historical landholdings to developers or have been pushed out by rising property taxes and cost of living.

== Geography ==
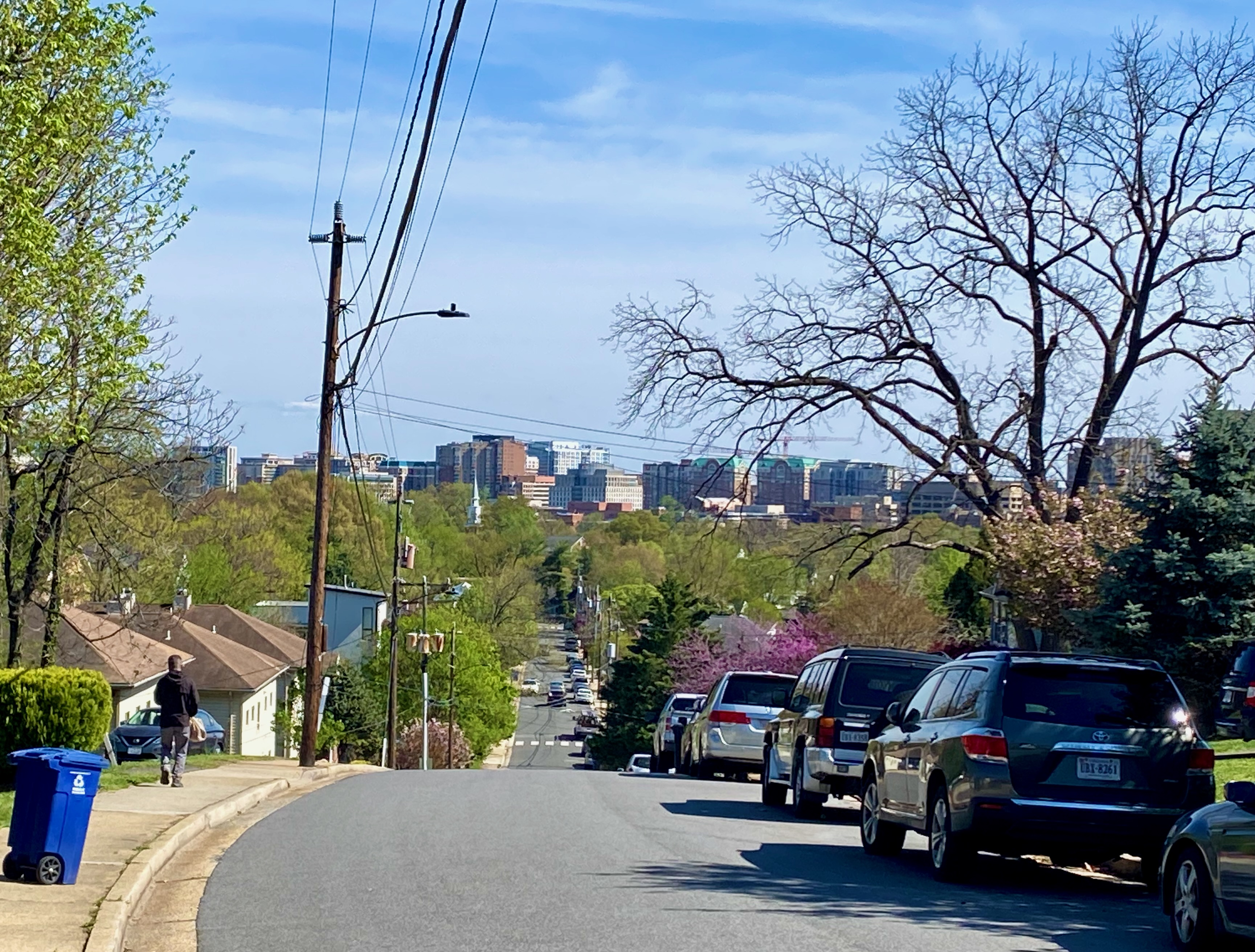
View towards Ballston on Culpeper Street

Hall's Hill is located on the highest elevation in Arlington County, and is generally bounded by North George Mason Drive, 16th Street North, North Edison Street, 17th Road North, North Culpeper Street, and North Dinwiddie Street. It is surrounded by the neighborhoods of Leeway-Overlee, Tara-Leeway Heights, Waycroft-Woodlawn, Glebewood, Old Dominion, and Yorktown.

== Infrastructure ==
Two arterial roads run through or near Hall's Hill. Langston Boulevard, which is a component highway of U.S. Route 29, passes through the north of the neighborhood. North Glebe Road, which is part of Virginia State Route 120, intersects with Langston Boulevard just to the east of Hall's Hill. It is served by the following Metrobus and Arlington Transit bus routes:

- Metrobus 3Y: E Falls Church-McPherson Sq
- ART 55: Rosslyn-East Falls Church

== Neighborhood amenities ==
High View Park, a 3-acre park that includes a playground, a baseball diamond, basketball courts, and a soccer field, is located near the center of the neighborhood on 1945 North Dinwiddie Street. Gateway Park, a small park with public art, is located at the intersection of Langston Boulevard and North Cameron Street The Langston-Brown Community Center, which includes sports facilities, a fitness center, an outdoor playground, and community history archive, is located on 2121 North Culpeper Street.

Hall's Hill hosts a variety of annual community events, including a Juneteenth celebration to commemorate the abolition of slavery in the United States following the Civil War, and a Turkey Bowl every Thanksgiving that has taken place since the late 1940s. The John M. Langston Citizens Association has also periodically organized walking tours covering Hall's Hill history and historical sites.

== Bibliography ==
- Bestebreurtje, Lindsey (2024). Built by the People Themselves: African American Community Development in Arlington, Virginia, from the Civil War through Civil Rights. Columbia: The University of South Carolina Press. ISBN 978-1-64336-498-8.
- Liebertz, John (2016). A Guide to the African American Heritage of Arlington, Virginia (PDF). Arlington County Department of Community Planning, Housing and Development, Historic Preservation Program.
- Rose, Jr., C. B. (1976). Arlington County, Virginia: A History. Baltimore: Port City Press.
- Wise, Donald A. (October 1979). "Bazil Hall of Hall's Hill" (PDF). Arlington Historical Magazine. 6 (3): 20–31.

== See also ==
- Arlington View
- Freedman's Village
- Nauck, Virginia
