= Overlee =

Overlee may refer to:

- Overlee Playing Fields, a park in Stamperland, Clarkston, East Renfrewshire
- Highland Park–Overlee Knolls, a historic district in Maryland

== See also ==
- Overlea, Maryland
