= Dion Diamond =

American civil rights activist (born 1941)

- 1961 mugshot of Diamond
- Born: Dion Tyrone Diamond; February 7, 1941 (age 85)
- Education: Howard University, University of Wisconsin, Harvard University

Dion Tyrone Diamond (born February 7, 1941) is an American civil rights activist.

== Early life ==
Dion Diamond was born February 7, 1941, in Petersburg, Virginia, where he spent the first 18 years of his life before attending Howard University in Washington D.C. Segregation was common in Petersburg and something Dion Diamond encountered frequently while he was growing up. In Petersburg, Diamond began to oppose segregation by going to white only restaurants, bathrooms, water fountains and other white only areas to annoy people. He said he would go to white only areas, and when he was instructed to leave, he would not listen until the police were called. Diamond describes these events as the beginning of his activism. He was president of his high school class and member of their student council.

=== College life ===
Diamond was the president of the Howard freshman class. While at Howard University, Dion Diamond noticed how segregation was prominent when crossing into Maryland or Virginia, but not very segregated in Washington D.C. Diamond and others at Howard organized a group called the Nonviolent Action Group. This group attended sit-ins in Virginia and North Carolina to come up with methods to oppose segregation. Sit-ins included going to white only areas with a group of black people to try to desegregate that area. The group desegregated an entire area in Alexandria, Virginia, in two weeks. They also had a run-in with American Nazi party leader, George Lincoln Rockwell. During this sit in, other American Nazi members came in and surrounded Diamond and the Non Violent Action Group.

In 1963, he transferred to the University of Wisconsin, where he majored in history and sociology. He noted that while attending the University of Wisconsin there were approximately 50 black students out of 18,000 students. After the University of Wisconsin, Diamond attended Harvard University in Cambridge, Massachusetts, where he got involved with race relations and sociology. Similar to Wisconsin, he was typically the only black student in his classes at Harvard, where students and professors would always defer to him when talking about race relations. Diamond said at times he felt uncomfortable by this role, but he came to embrace it because he was able to influence others. he says he regrets not forming many relationships at Wisconsin or Harvard.

== Activism ==
Diamond claims he believes in nonviolence as a tactic but not as a philosophy. As a tactic, he believed nonviolence was a smart approach because this would refrain him or his group from being involved with police. However, he says he does not believe this as a philosophy because this is how people could physically take advantage of them when authorities were not around. In the summer of 1960, Diamond and the Nonviolent Action group picketed and protested Glen Echo Park in Maryland. His most notable form of activism was the Freedom Rides, which started in March 1961. Although Diamond was not one of the original 13 freedom riders, he ended up being part of the group. The Freedom Ride almost ended after the burning of the bus in Anniston, Alabama, but several of Diamond and his constituents at Howard insisted on continuing the freedom rides. They ventured to Montgomery, Alabama and continued the ride to Jackson, Mississippi. They were escorted by state police and the National Guard. A deal had been made between Bobby Kennedy and the governor of Mississippi. The deal was cut to ensure the Freedom Riders would not be beaten, but would be arrested immediately if they did not move on. The charges were considered a "breach of peace." Diamond said as long as the newspapers followed and covered them, their activism would be heard around the United States. Although it was the National Guard's job to ensure the safety of the freedom riders, Diamond noted that the members of the national guard were often the same people who opposed their Civil Rights movements. Dion Diamond believed it was a bad idea to start a fight or resist in Jackson during the freedom rides.

1961 mugshot of Diamond

After stopping in Jackson, Diamond and others were arrested and sent to the county jail in Mississippi. Although they were arrested early because Diamond was in one of the first buses that arrived in Jackson, he was pleased to hear that many others followed their lead and continued the bus rides into Jackson. Diamond was selected to attend a month long seminar for civil rights activists. Diamond has exclaimed he could not possibly imagine going through his life by just turning his cheek, and is proud he was able to influence and help others. Diamond believes young people's lack of knowledge of the civil rights movement is dangerous because this may revert to racism and segregation again. Diamond said when he first got involved in activism he wanted to get involved to make a difference and break segregation barriers, without any long range plan. Diamond explained how he was fearful after getting out of jail in Mississippi. While living in Mississippi, there was a shotgun blast that came through his window. He noted that his small waist size saved him from getting hit by the bullet. When this window was shot, he said he became more aware of the danger he and other black people faced. He also worked with younger people on voter registration in Baton Rouge.

Diamond says he has been arrested roughly 30 times, which all were connected to civil rights movements. In 1963, Diamond and others were trying to raise funds for voter registration activities. Diamond was sent to Columbus, Ohio to attend the annual congress of the National Student Association. At this conference, he realized many kids he knew from Howard University were graduating and getting decent jobs. He mentioned to someone that he thought it was time to get back into school. When saying this, Diamond was standing next to the president of the student government of the University of Wisconsin, who asked him to consider attending Wisconsin. He immediately had his transcript sent to Wisconsin and enrolled in September. Diamond claims he thinks schooling in America in the 21st century is not personal enough, and that when he was a student, teachers knew students' personal lives on deeper levels. Diamond believes it is unfortunate that the best black athletes do not attend Historically black colleges and universities due to the lack of funding these colleges have.

=== Freedom Riders ===
The Freedom Riders were a group of American Civil Rights Activists who protested segregated bus terminals. The Freedom Riders protested by completing bus rides throughout the South. On these bus trips, freedom riders would often stop at different bus stops and attempt to use the white only restrooms or lunch counters as a way of opposing segregation in the south. The riders experienced horrific police brutality and other violent acts by white counter protestors.

Diamond was a part of the freedom ride in Anniston, Alabama on May 14, 1961. An angry mob of approximately 200 white people waited upon the arrival of the freedom riders. The tires of the bus blew out and when this happened, one of the white protesters threw a bomb onto the bus, and the bus exploded as the Freedom Riders were just able to escape. After they escaped, many were beaten by the white mob members. This called for the attorney general Bobby Kennedy to talk with governors of Mississippi and Alabama, so the freedom riders would have police escorts during their next ride from Montgomery to Jackson. Just ten days later, on May 24, 1961, the Freedom Riders began their ride from Montgomery to Jackson with the national guard and police escorting them. These freedom rides called for nationwide attention and created much support from the Freedom Riders. The Freedom Riders influenced many black people to attempt to use white only areas. Diamond has mentioned how the state penitentiary ran out of space because of the mass amounts of Freedom Riders who were arrested.

== Personal life ==
Diamond started his own consulting firm. He worked for a company called HEW and helped design an instrument that helped determine fraud in the Medicare and Medicaid program. This exposed doctors and pharmacies who were getting away with theft. He also worked as a consultant for different government agencies, where he worked in race relations. While working for government agencies, his job consisted of discerning segregated powers and influencing companies to have a more diverse clientele. Diamond retired around age 60, and has now been retired for around 20 years. Diamond mentioned how if he was not involved with civil rights, he would not have attended Wisconsin, Harvard or been able to have his own consulting firm, in which he worked with companies in race relations. Diamond currently lives in Washington, D.C.

=== Comments on Black Lives Matter ===
When asked about the Black Lives Matter protests, which have been common within the 2010s and 2020s, Diamond said he sees it as a continuation of his work and others of the 1960s civil rights movement. Diamond also acknowledges the people who came before him in the post World War II generation. Diamond believes they largely influenced his generation to be strong enough to start the Civil Rights movement. Diamond also mentions the importance of generational activism. He explains how he has not been as active with protesting or educating the youth in his older age, but stresses the importance of how activism needs to be passed down through generations. He mentioned the similarities between Trump rallies and Ku Klux Klan rallies. He notes that the United States has come a long way, but still does not believe they are close to having a total integrated society. Diamond said that what came before these newer generations is important to note because your past defines your future.

Diamond is proud to see the amount of elected black governmental officials in the 21st century, which he notes is a large progression from when he was growing up. The Civil Rights Act of 1964 and the election of president Barack Obama are the highlights of his life because he never expected to see the amount of black elected officials that are in office today. Diamond has mentioned that he does not regret anything he has done, but instead regrets not doing more in his older age. He says it is important for younger people to educate him, and feels he can learn more from them, than they can from him.
