= Drug Fair =

Discontinued American drug store chain

- Type: Private
- Industry: Drugstore
- Founded: 1954; 72 years ago
- Defunct: 2009; 17 years ago
- Fate: Bankruptcy
- Successor: Walgreens
- Headquarters: Somerset, New Jersey
- Key people: Tim LeBeau, CEO
- Number of employees: 1700
- Parent: Sun Capital Partners
- Subsidiaries: Cost Cutters

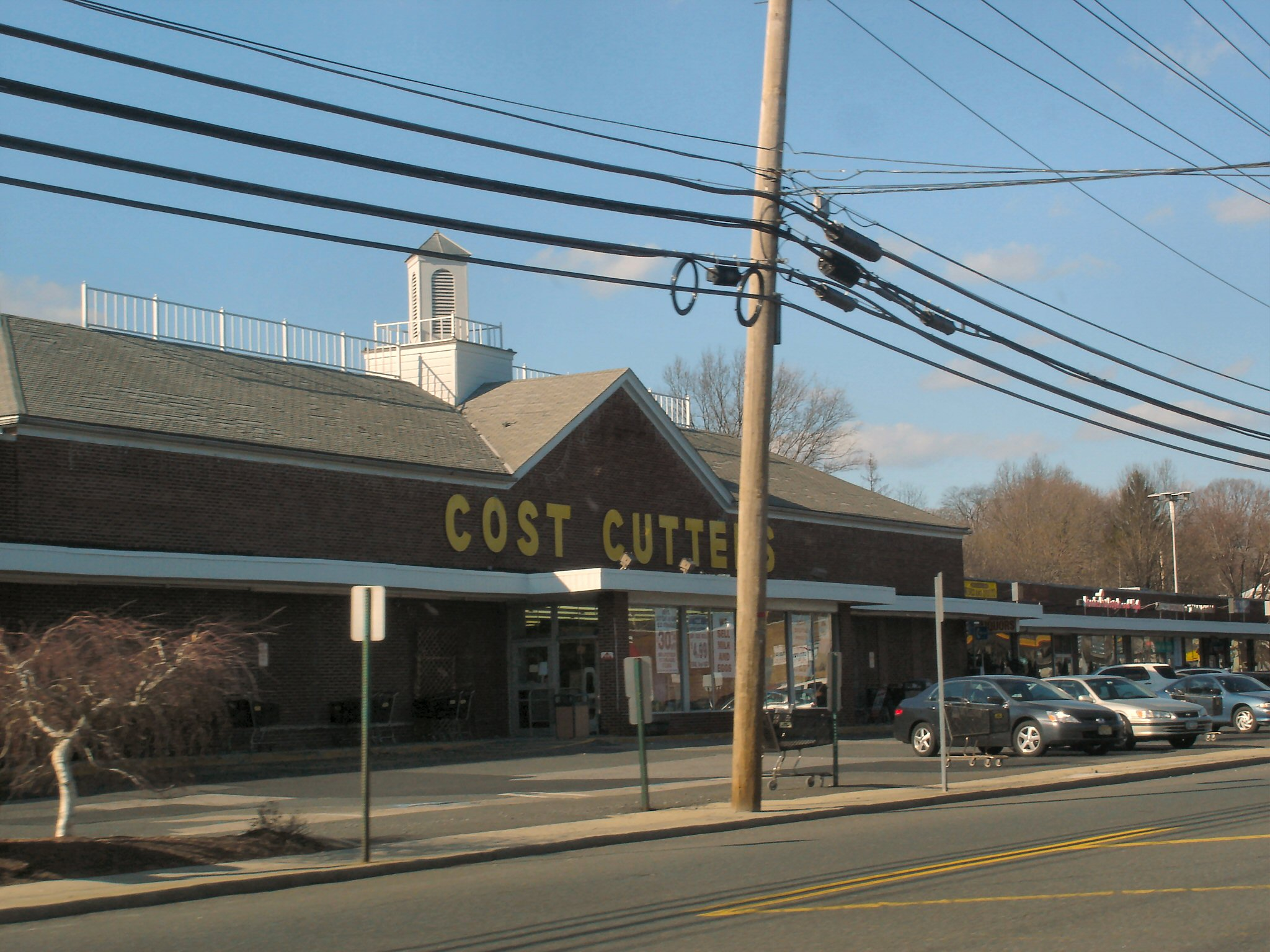
In addition to its namesake division, Drug Fair operated the Cost Cutters chain of stores. This store was located in a former Centennial design A&P store in Norwood, New Jersey.

Drug Fair was a chain of drugstores based in New Jersey.

== History ==
Drug Fair was founded in 1954, and headquartered in Somerset, New Jersey. In addition to its drugstore chain Drug Fair also owned and operated Cost Cutters, a discount drug and general merchandise chain.

In 2005, Drug Fair was acquired by Sun Capital Partners, a private equity firm.

By mid-2008 Drug Fair operated 50 locations and Cost Cutters, had another eleven locations.

In March 2009, two Drug Fair locations in Raritan and Rockaway, New Jersey closed abruptly. Shortly after the two stores closed, Drug Fair announced it was filing for Chapter 11 bankruptcy protection. Just prior to the filing for bankruptcy, Drug Fair announced it was selling thirty-two drugstores to Walgreens, who also purchased prescription lists from several other Drug Fair locations. After the purchase, Drug Fair announced that their stores in Bridgewater, North Arlington, and East Rutherford, New Jersey would be quickly liquidated and closed along with one of their two locations in Clifton, New Jersey. Shortly thereafter, another ten Drug Fair locations and nine Cost Cutters stores were marked for closure. These stores began liquidating immediately afterward and were shuttered in May 2009; many of the stores' leases were purchased by Dollar General and reopened under that banner.

On May 16, 2009, the sale was finalized and the Drug Fair stores still in the chain became Walgreens.

Private investment company Oak Point Partners acquired the remnant assets, consisting of any known and unknown assets that weren't previously administered, from the Drug Fair Group, Inc., et al., Bankruptcy Estates on March 18, 2013.

== Original Drug Fair locations ==
- Easton, Maryland
- Manassas Park, Virginia
- Plainfield, New Jersey
- Westfield, New Jersey
- Hillside, New Jersey
