= Highland Park–Overlee Knolls =

Historic house in Virginia, United States

- U.S. National Register of Historic Places
- U.S. Historic district
- Virginia Landmarks Register
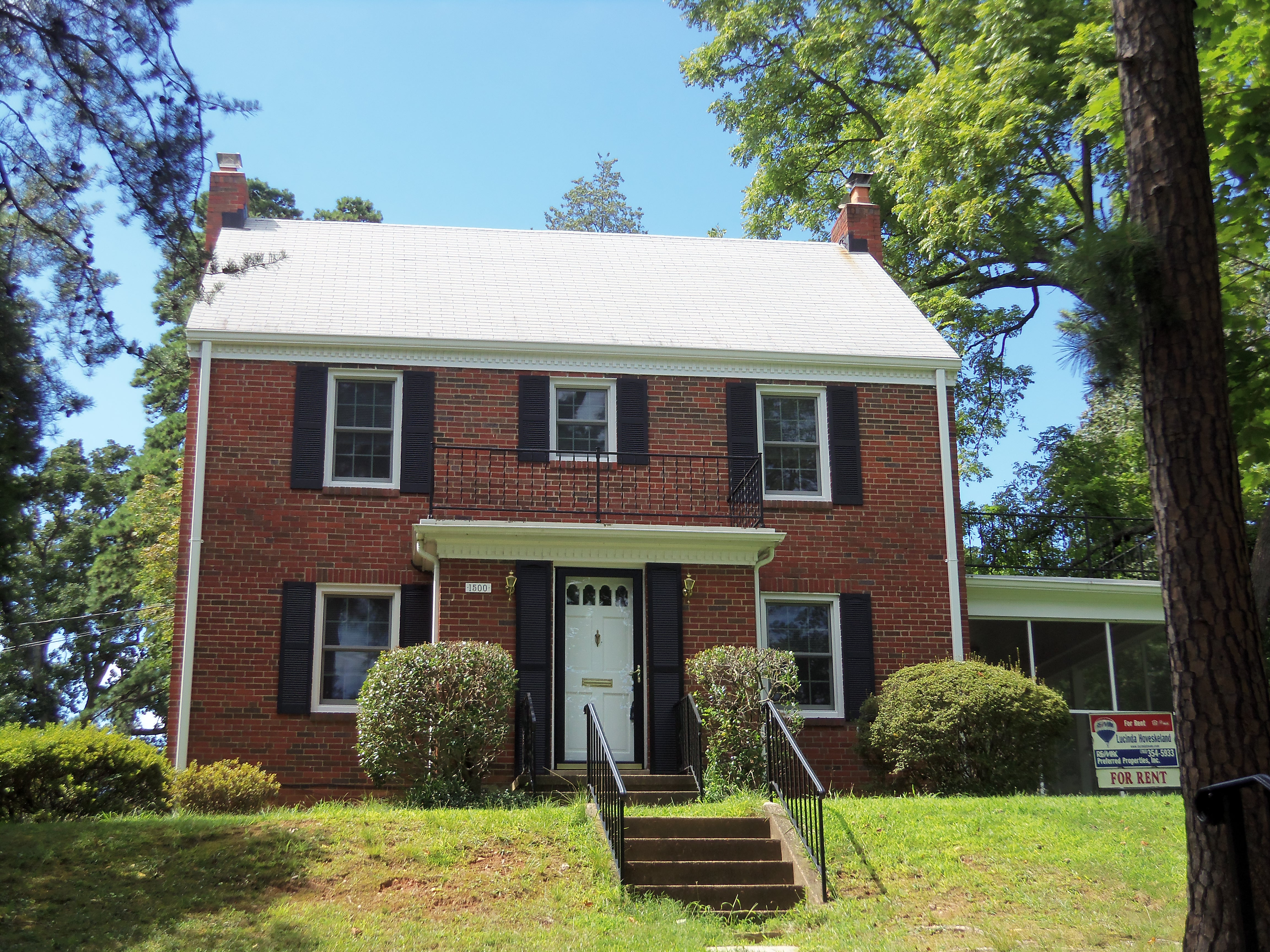

- Location within Northern Virginia Location within Virginia Location within the United States
- Location: Roughly bounded by 22nd St. N., N. Lexington St., 16th St. N., N. Longfellow St., McKinley Rd., I-66 & N. Quantico St., Arlington, Virginia
- Coordinates: 38°53′12″N 77°08′49″W
- Area: 180.7 acres (73.1 ha)
- Built: 1890-c. 1960
- Architectural style: Queen Anne, Italianate, Colonial Revival, Craftsman, Tudor Revival, and Modern Movement
- MPS: Historic Residential Suburbs in the United States, 1830-1960 MPS
- NRHP reference No.: 11000548
- VLR No.: 000-9703

Significant dates
- Added to NRHP: August 18, 2011
- Designated VLR: June 16, 2011

Highland Park–Overlee Knolls, also known as Fostoria, is a national historic district located in Arlington County, Virginia. It is directly east of the Virginia Heights Historic District. It contains 681 contributing buildings, 3 contributing sites, and 1 contributing structure in a residential neighborhood in North Arlington. The first subdivision was platted in 1890 and known as Fostoria.

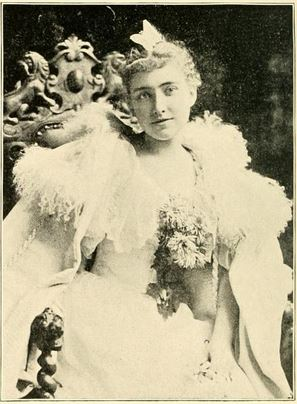
Miriam Nina C. Ballinger

The company, which was seen in advertisements as Fostoria Land and Improvement Company, was incorporated in November 1890. William E. Abbott served as president, with James M. Hoge as secretary, and Madison A. Ballinger acting as the real estate broker. Madison A. Ballinger was active in Washington, D.C., society. His house was decorated in red, white and blue, in honor of the Daughters of the American Revolution, of which his wife was the President of the Continental Chapter.

Later subdivisions of Fostoria were platted including Over-Lee Knolls (1926), Section Two Over-Lee Knolls (1927), Richmond Hill Section Three (1946), Richmond Hill Section Four (1947) and Highland Park Village (1947). It primarily consists of single family dwellings in a number of popular architectural styles including Queen Anne, Italianate, Colonial Revival, Craftsman, Tudor Revival, and Modern-style. Also located in the district is Parkhurst Park (1939). The houses were built by multiple developers and speculative builders.

It was listed on the National Register of Historic Places in 2011.
