= Stratford Junior High School =

Historic school building in Virginia, US

- U.S. National Register of Historic Places
- Virginia Landmarks Register
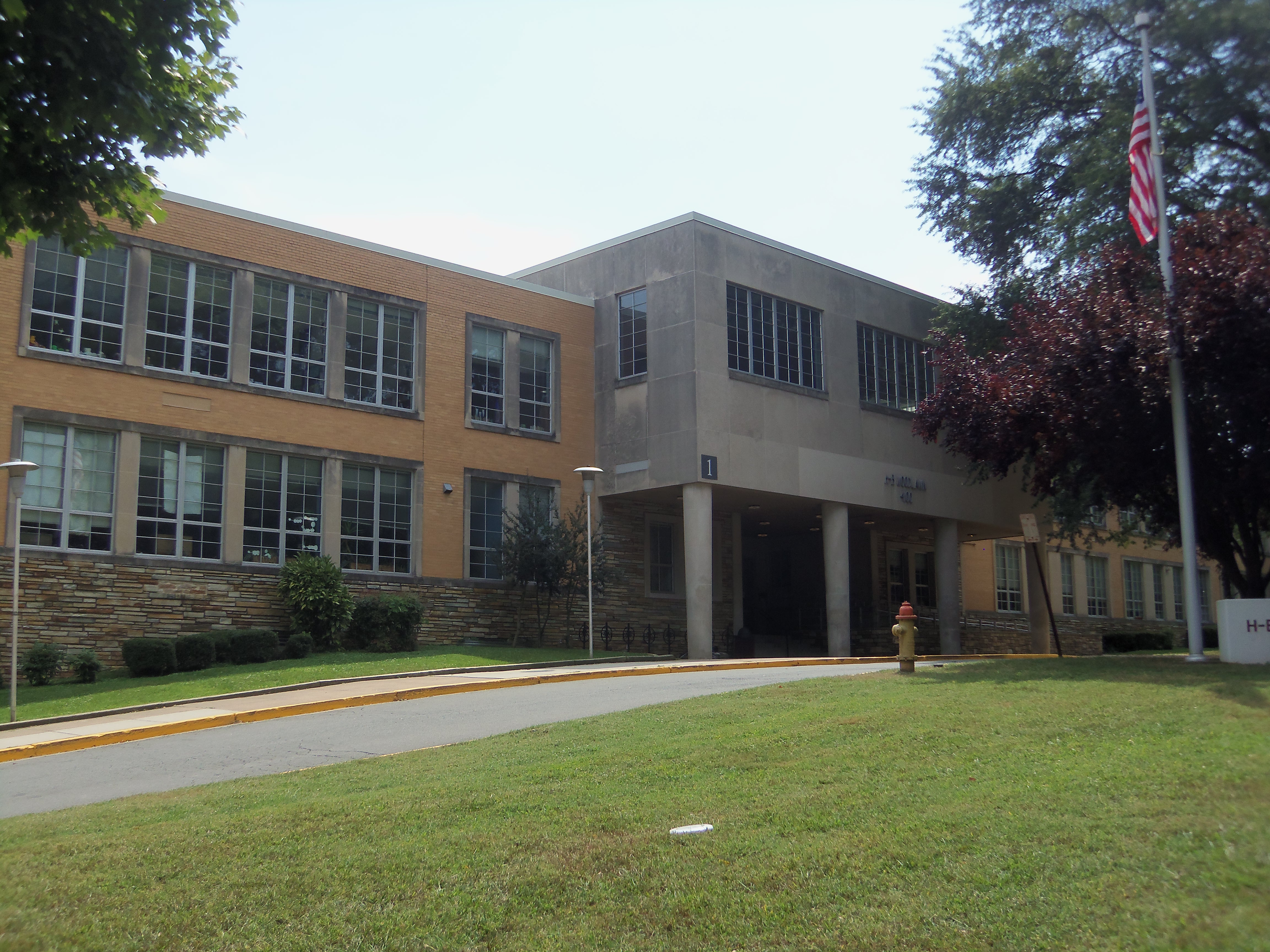

- Location within District of Columbia Location within Virginia Location within the United States
- Location: 4100 Vacation Ln., Arlington, Virginia
- Coordinates: 38°54′0″N 77°6′44″W
- Area: 8.8 acres (3.6 ha)
- Built: 1950
- Built by: Wise Contracting Co.
- Architect: Burket, Rhees Evans Sr.
- Architectural style: International Style
- NRHP reference No.: 04000110
- VLR No.: 000-9412

Significant dates
- Added to NRHP: February 26, 2004
- Designated VLR: December 3, 2003

Stratford Junior High School is a historic junior high school building located in the Cherrydale neighborhood of Arlington, Virginia. It was designed in 1949 and built in 1950. An addition was built in 1995. It is a two- to three-story, concrete post-and-beam building clad primarily in buff brick and sandstone veneer. The building is in a high style International Style architecture. It features a two-story, three bay projecting portico of exposed concrete on four tapered concrete columns. Other features include a flat parapet roof, decorative minimalism, and the strong horizontal qualities of the building emphasized by the use of finishing materials and banded windows.

In 1959, Stratford Junior High School became the first public secondary school in the Commonwealth of Virginia to desegregate with the admission of four African American students. From 1978 to 2019, it housed the H-B Woodlawn Secondary Program. It is now the site of Dorothy Hamm Middle School, with a new addition started in 2019, and finished in 2021. In 2023, the current student attendance is 851 students including 15 ESL.

The building was listed on the Virginia Landmarks Register in 2003. It was listed on the National Register of Historic Places in 2004. It was designated as a local Historic District by the Arlington County Board in 2016.
