= Nonviolent Action Group =

Student organization campaigning for civil rights

The Nonviolent Action Group (NAG) was a student-run campus organization at Howard University that campaigned against racial segregation and other civil rights causes in the areas of Virginia, Maryland and Washington D.C. during the 1960s

Civil Rights Movement activist Stokely Carmichael was a member of NAG while a student at Howard.
