= Rosslyn Mountain Boys =

Musical band

Rosslyn Mountain Boys was a band that backed up a number of nationally known singers, and released three albums of their own.

Joe Triplet was a member of the Washington D.C. counterculture band Claude Jones with Happy Acosta and Jay Sprague. Joe and Happy began performing as an acoustic duo calling themselves the Rosslyn Mountain Boys (RMB). The RMB made a decision to go electric and invited Peter Bonta of The Nighthawks join as bass player, along with Bob Berberich from Grin on drums. Tommy Hannum on pedal-steel guitar, who had been working with Emmylou Harris, rounded out the band When Jay Sprague also came aboard from Claude Jones, Peter was able to move over to keyboards and guitar.

The Rosslyn Mountain Boys opened for and backed up stars such as Emmylou Harris, Conway Twitty, Tammy Wynette, Vassar Clements, Bill Anderson, Jerry Lee Lewis, Loretta Lynn and Buck Owens. The band released two albums. The first album on the Adelphi label sold very well due in main part to heavy radio play by WHFS and the band playing steady gigs at clubs like the Birchmere, Desperados and the County Line.

The RMB called it quits in 1979 and the members went in various directions. Peter was a member of Artful Dodger before opening Wally Cleaver's Recordings in Fredericksburg, Virginia, Tommy Hannum relocated to Nashville and has been Ricky Van Shelton's band leader and an in-demand session player for some years while Peter Bonta and Rico Petrocelli, the last RMB bassist, went on to record and tour with Mary Chapin Carpenter.

The cover of the Rosslyn Mountain Boys album showed the band in a glade, with the 1970s skyline of Rosslyn, Virginia in Arlington County, directly opposite Georgetown, D.C. on the Potomac River, behind them. This neighborhood of coal yards, pawn shops, a brewery, and trolley connections, had suddenly been developed upwards in the 1960s when Washington building codes restricting the height of structures in the district, forced developers of office towers to hop across the river to the Old Dominion.

The band saw heavy play on WHFS when the station was broadcasting from Bethesda, Maryland broadcasting at 102.3.

== Discography ==
- The Rosslyn Mt. Boys, Adelphi label, 1977
- Lone Outsider, Schizophonic Records, 1981
- Different Skyline, Sosumi Records, 2006.
