= Rosslyn, Virginia =

Neighborhood in Virginia, US

Coordinates: 38°53′48″N 77°04′21″W

Rosslyn
- Unincorporated area
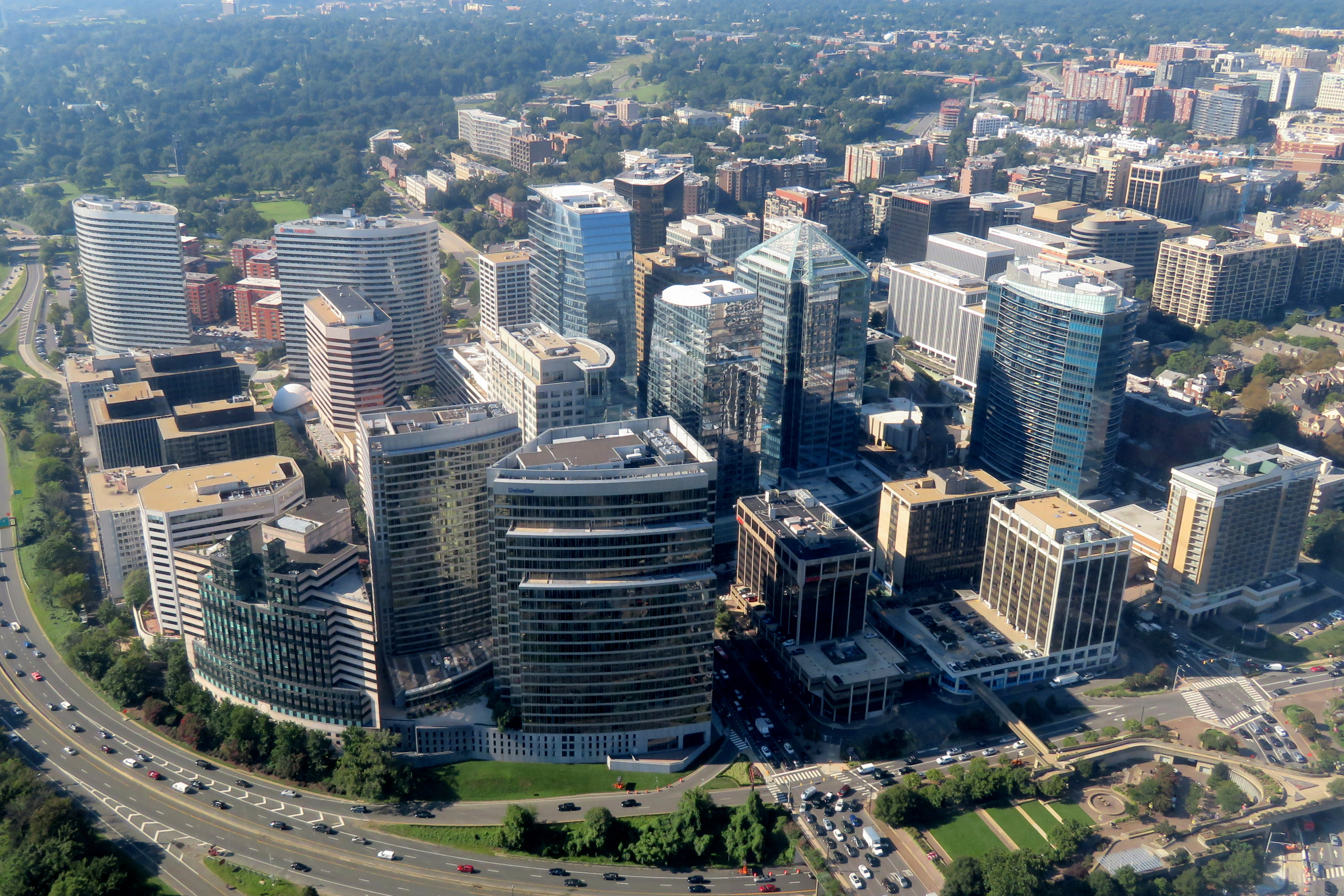
- An aerial view of Rosslyn in September 2018
- Interactive map of Rosslyn
- Country: United States of America
- State: Virginia
- County: Arlington

Population (2010)
  - Total: 12,314
- Time zone: UTC-5 (EST)
  - Summer (DST): UTC-4 (EDT)
- ZIP Codes: 22209
- Area code: 703
- Website: www.rosslynva.org

Rosslyn (/ˈrɒzlɪn/ ROZ-lin) is a heavily urbanized neighborhood in northeastern Arlington County, Virginia, United States. It is in Northern Virginia, north of Arlington National Cemetery and directly across the Potomac River from Georgetown and Foggy Bottom in Washington, D.C.

Rosslyn encompasses the Arlington neighborhoods of North Rosslyn and Radnor/Ft. Myer Heights, and is located east of Court House, another urbanized Arlington neighborhood. Characterized as one of several "urban villages" by the county, the numerous skyscrapers in the dense business section of Rosslyn make its appearance in some ways more urban than nearby Washington. Rosslyn residents have an average household income of $105,000 and 81% are college graduates.

Establishments in the neighborhood include Sinclair Broadcast Group-owned ABC affiliate WJLA located in the Rosslyn Twin Towers, and Marriott International's longest operating hotel, the former Key Bridge Marriott. Notable structures include the United States Marine Corps War Memorial, and the Netherlands Carillon and Freedom Park offer views of the Washington Monument and other Washington landmarks.

== History ==
=== Colonial era and early history ===
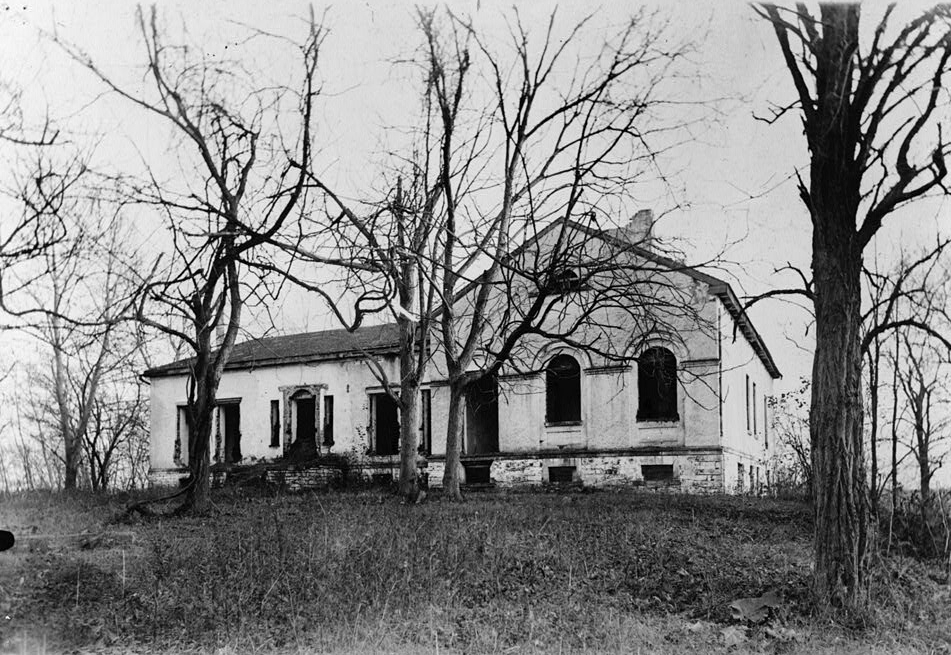
John Mason's summer home c. 1880-1890

Part of the Lords Fairfax's Northern Neck Proprietary during the colonial era, much of present-day Rosslyn was included Thomas Owsley's 640-acre land grant in the 1690s. Landowner Francis Awbrey purchased land along the Potomac River shoreline near Theodore Roosevelt Island, then known by various names including Analostan Island, in 1733 and established a ferry that provided service to the mouth of Rock Creek after 1738; he also operated a tavern nearby. Awbrey's descendants eventually sold the property to George Mason in 1767, who also ran a ferry between Georgetown and Analostan Island. Mason bequeathed this land to his son John in 1792, who thereafter built a summer residence on Analostan Island and attempted to establish a town named South Haven where Rosslyn now stands; this venture was ultimately unsuccessful and only a few homes were built near the Mason's ferry.

John Mason eventually lost his properties in the 1830s after a series of business failures. His creditor, the Bank of the United States, took possession of Mason's holdings in the Rosslyn area and began selling them off starting in 1836. By 1860, several families, including the Dawsons, Birches, and Rosses, had farms in the area, which they operated with enslaved labor. The Ross farm, which William H Ross established on August 1, 1860 after being gifted land following his marriage to his wife Carolyn, was called "Ross Lynn"; this was eventually shortened to "Rosslyn".

=== Civil War and early development ===
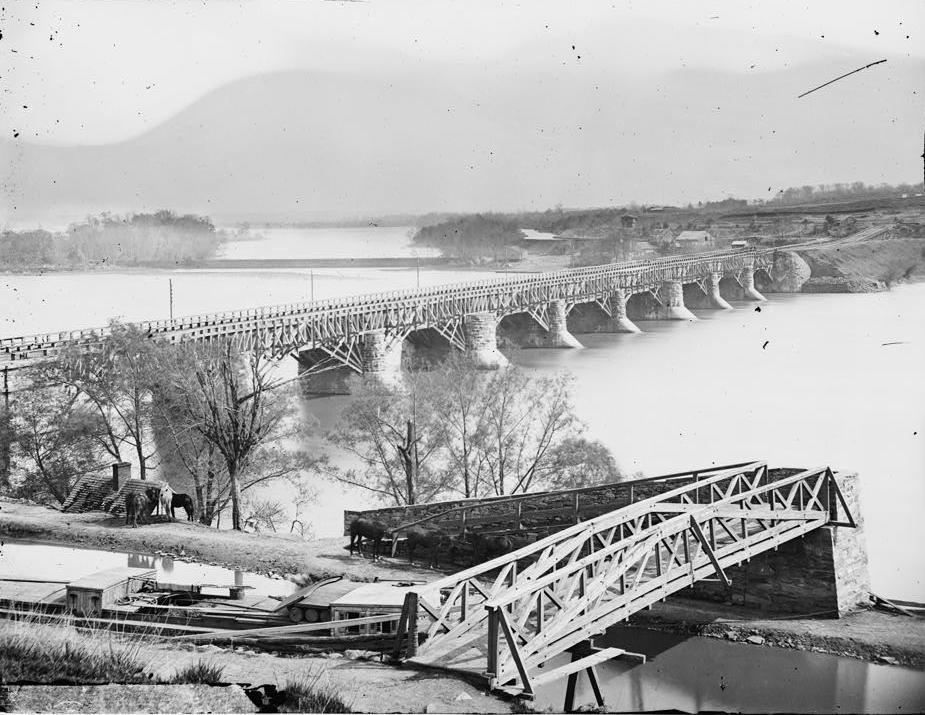
Image of Aqueduct Bridge taken from Georgetown, c. 1860-1865

The Alexandria Canal, which connected Alexandria with Georgetown's Chesapeake and Ohio Canal via the Aqueduct Bridge completed in 1843, ran through present-day Rosslyn along the Potomac River. The Rosslyn area's location at the foot of the bridge rendered it a strategically important bridgehead during the Civil War, which was crossed by Major Wood and his unit in May 1861 as a part of the Union army's occupation of Alexandria County. Several forts, including Fort Corcoran, Fort Bennett, and Fort Haggarty, were constructed near the Aqueduct Bridge as a part of the Union's Arlington Line of defenses. The bridge itself was drained during the course of the war and used as a roadway for troops and supplies. Additionally, Analostan Island was the site of the Union's Camp Greene, where the 1st U.S. Colored Infantry Regiment were first mustered in May 1863; after troops left the camp in April 1864, the installation served as a contraband camp for hundreds of formerly enslaved refugees from the South. The area was first designated as "Rosslyn", after the Ross's farm, in an 1865 map of the Union's defenses of Washington.

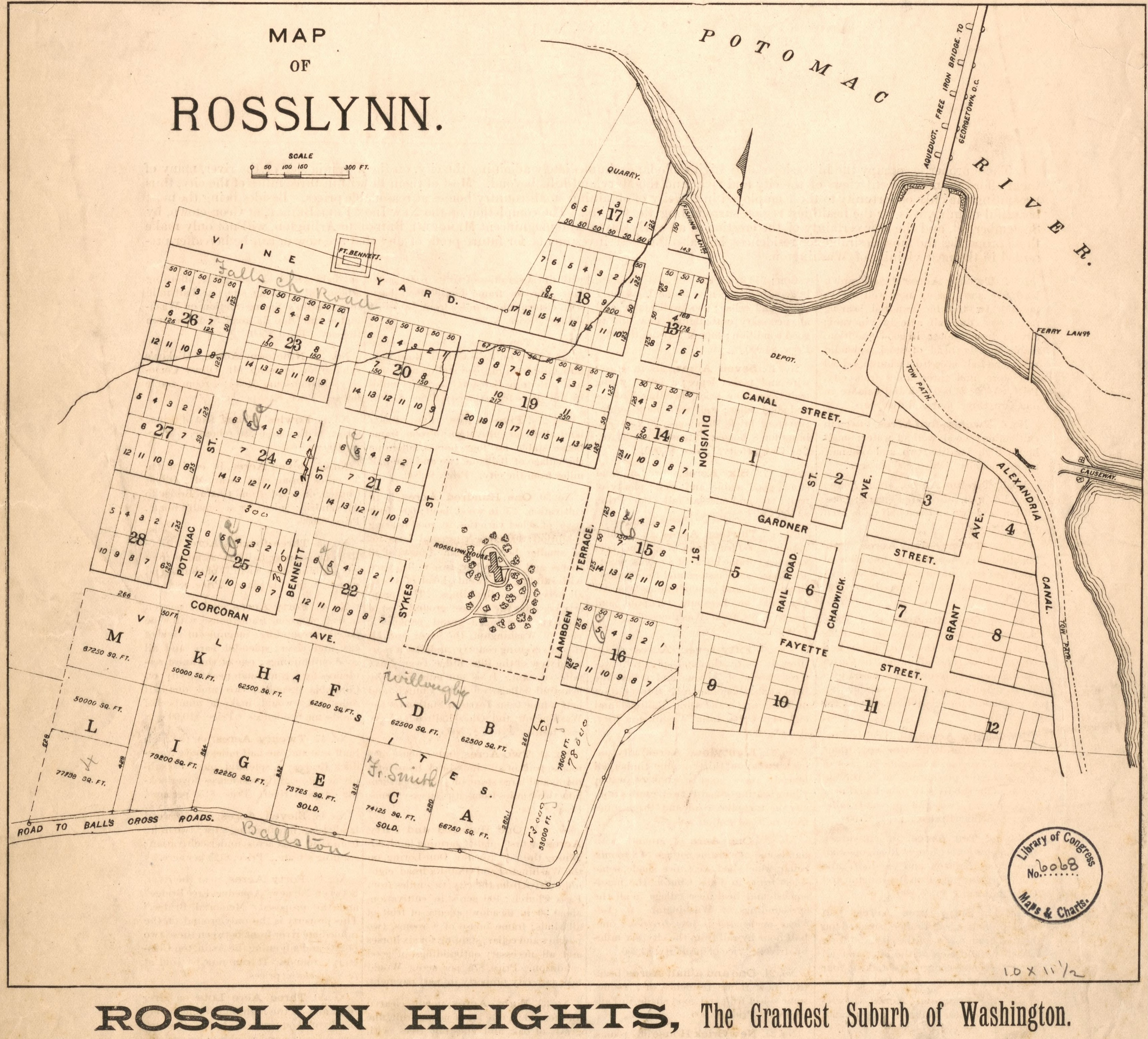
1888 map of Rosslyn by T.H. Sypherd & Co. The Rosslyn farm is visible in the middle of the street grid.

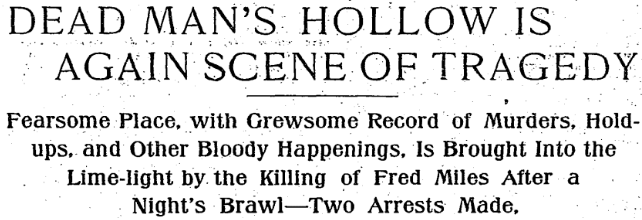
Headline from the July 25, 1906 edition of the Washington Post detailing a murder in Dead Man's Hollow

In 1869, a group of investors acquired the Rosslyn farm and other properties and attempted to develop the "Town of Rosslyn". While this ultimately failed like John Mason's earlier attempt, the continued presence of soldiers at Fort Whipple, later renamed Fort Myer in 1881, in the immediate aftermath of the Civil War as well as Rosslyn's proximity to the Aqueduct Bridge, which was converted to a two-tier bridge in 1868 that supported both canal and foot traffic, enabled the development of gambling houses, saloons, and brothels by the 1870s. The Consumer Brewery, which was established 1896 and housed in a plant designed by architect Albert Goenner, supplied these establishments with local beer. A ravine near the community nicknamed Dead Man's Hollow became the focus of media attention throughout the rest of the 19th and into the early 20th centuries as the location of assaults, murders, and other crimes. Rosslyn also became home to a black enclave during this period and was notable for being an interracial neighborhood in Arlington at a time when the county became increasingly racially segregated in the post-Reconstruction era.

=== 1900 through 1950 ===
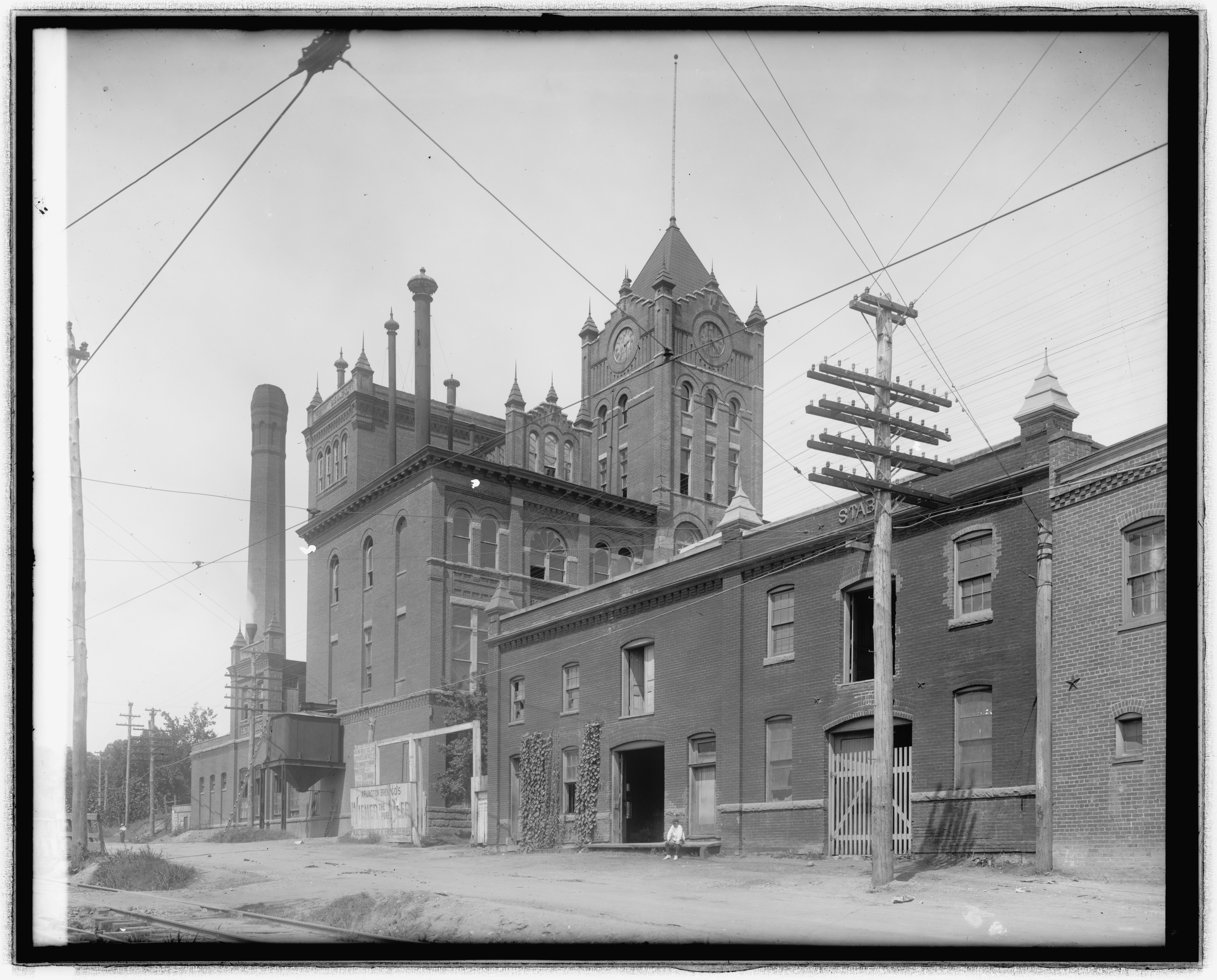
Arlington Brewing Company plant and stables, c. 1910-1926

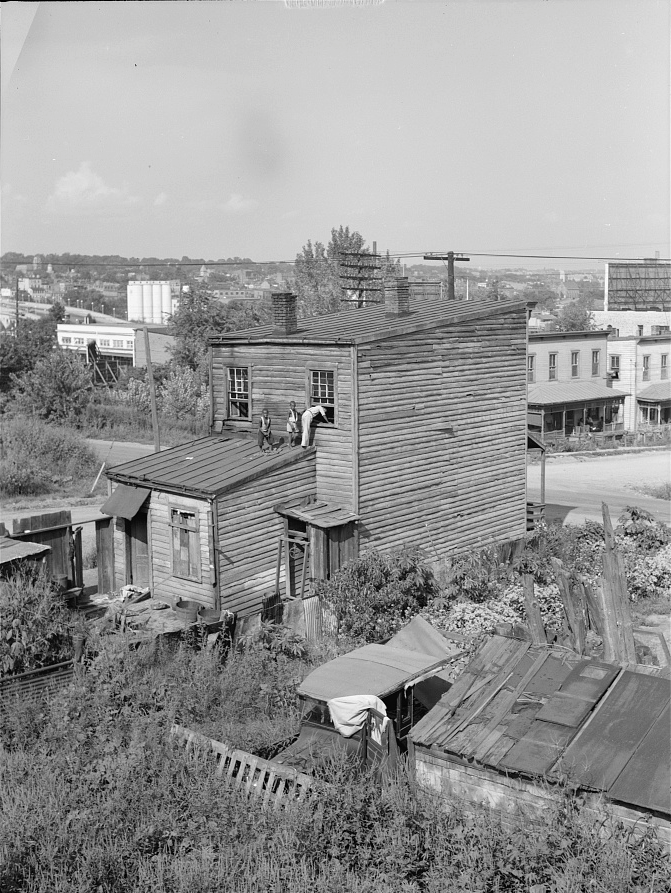
House in Rosslyn's black enclave, John Vachon (1937)

Rosslyn's criminal activity, nightlife, and status as an interracial neighborhood made it the focus of Arlington's Southern Progressive reformers by the early 20th century. These figures, who included attorney Crandal Mackey and developer Frank Lyon, had organized the Good Citizen's League in the 1890s to eradicate Arlington's "areas of vice" in order to facilitate Arlington's growing suburbanization driven by its expanding interurban trolley network. Consistent with Southern Progressive objectives, the League sought to achieve this while maintaining Arlington's racial hierarchy and segregation of its black residents. This culminated in the violent raiding of several saloons and gambling halls by Mackey and other League members on May 30, 1904. Rosslyn's casinos and brothels continued to operate into the 1920s, with some located on floating barges underneath the Key Bridge and along Rosslyn's waterfront; these business were later cleared during the construction of the George Washington Memorial Parkway. Prohibition led to the conversion of Rosslyn's Consumer Brewery, which had earlier been renamed Arlington Brewery, into a Cherry Smash soda bottling plant in 1920.

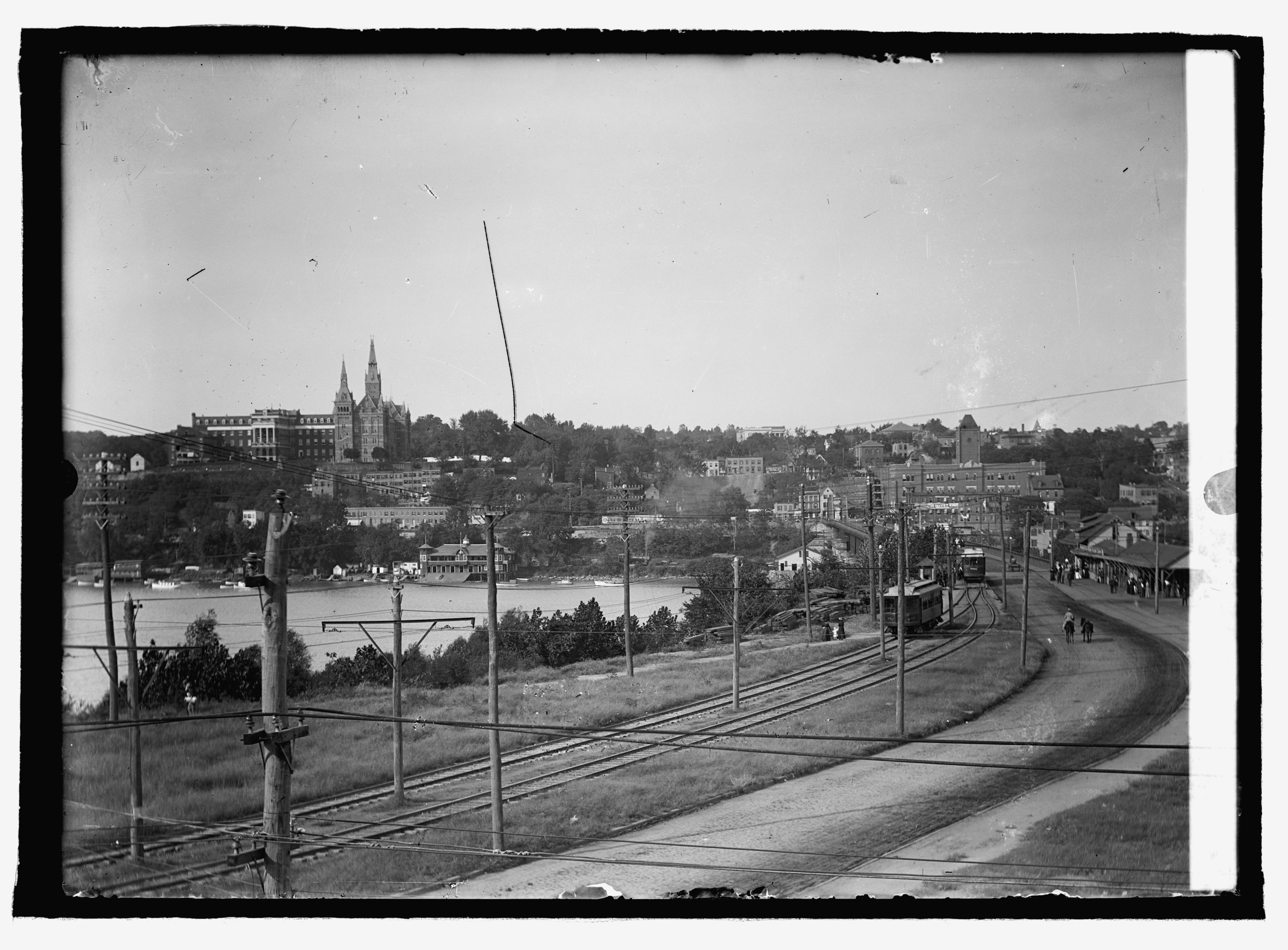
Trolley lines along the Aqueduct Bridge, c. 1909-1920. The original Rosslyn Station can be seen on the far right

From the late 19th century, Rosslyn was a central node in Arlington's electric trolley system, with the Great Falls & Old Dominion Railway providing service between Rosslyn and Great Falls beginning in 1906 and the Washington, Arlington, and Falls Church Railway (W-V) providing service out to Green Valley, Fairfax Court House, and Arlington Junction; service continued to expand after the formation of the Washington & Old Dominion Railway (W&OD) in 1912. After the Aqueduct Bridge was demolished and replaced by the Key Bridge in 1923, the Capital Traction Company was able to displace W&OD service to Washington, which the W&OD connected to with a new Rosslyn Terminal station. Financial difficulties experienced by the railroad companies during the Great Depression, rising car ownership, and highway construction caused the end of passenger rail service in Rosslyn and elsewhere in Arlington by the 1930s. The subsequent conversion of Arlington's passenger railways into freight services resulted in Rosslyn becoming the location for rail yards and industrial storage facilities.

=== 1960s redevelopment through present ===
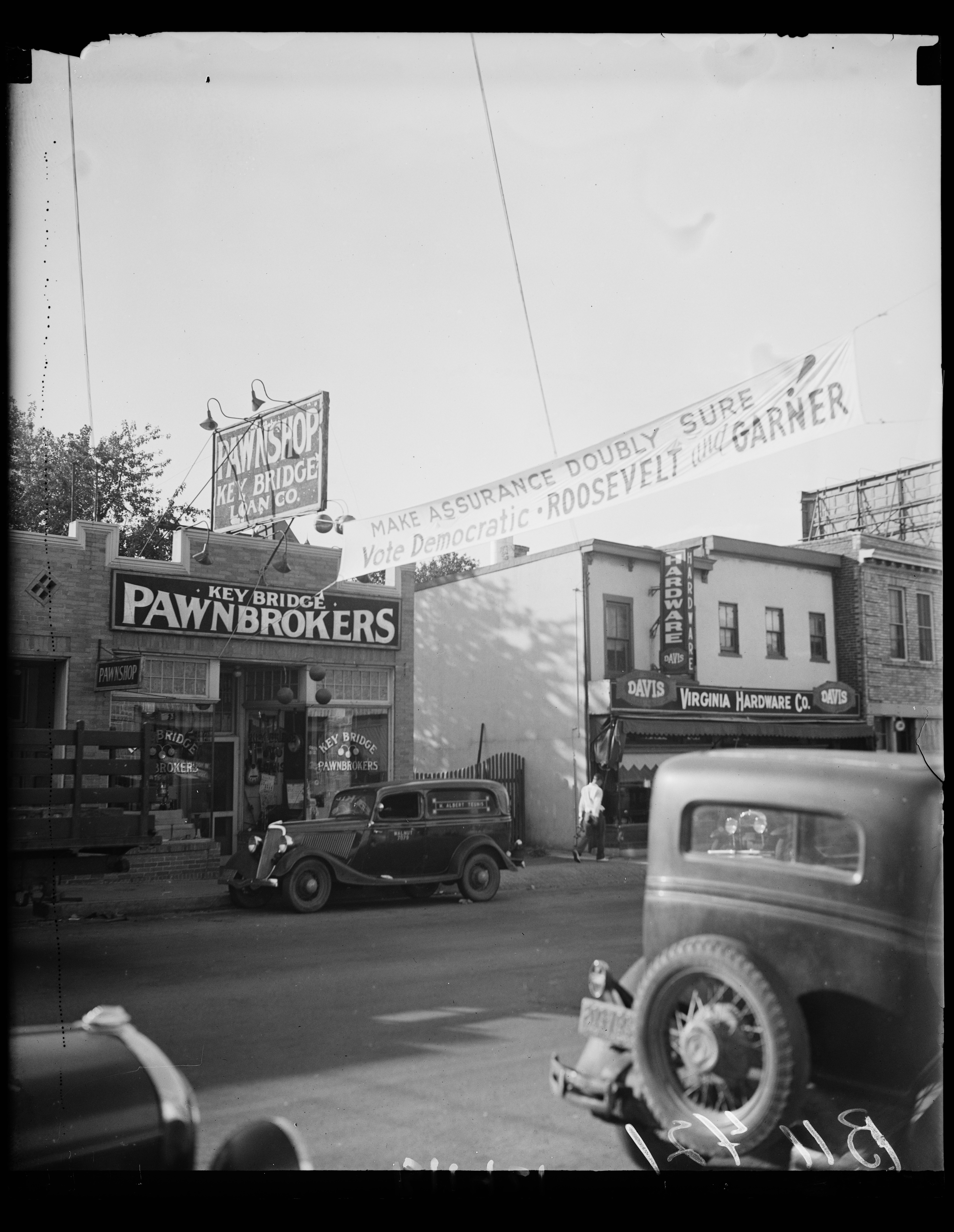
1936 image of pawnshop and Roosevelt presidential campaign banner

By the mid 20th century, Rosslyn was characterized by industrial infrastructure, pawnshops, and vacant lots. Described by Arlington's planning board as having a "general appearance [that] brings no credit whatsoever to the county" in 1957, Arlington's county government sought to transform Rosslyn into a high-rise district to attract more commercial businesses and reduce its economic reliance on the federal government, for which it had been dependent on for much of its tax revenue since World War II. The General Land Use Plan (GLUP) adopted by Arlington in 1961 rezoned Rosslyn for commercial use, which, guided by the county's Rosslyn Plan, enabled developers to rapidly erect skyscrapers; 19 of these were built between 1962 and 1967. Former landmarks, including the Arlington Brewery in 1958, were cleared over the next few decades to make way for office, hotel, and highway construction. Government agencies and contractors became one of the largest share of office tenants as Rosslyn emerged as a central business district.

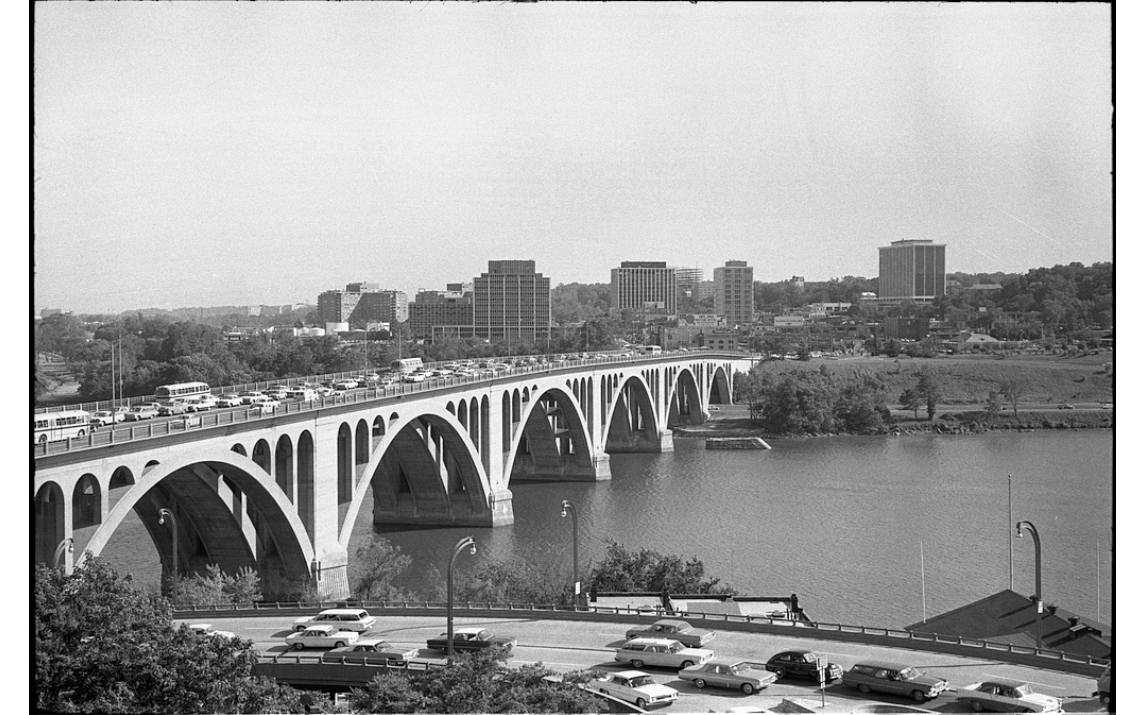
Rosslyn skyline from Georgetown in 1964

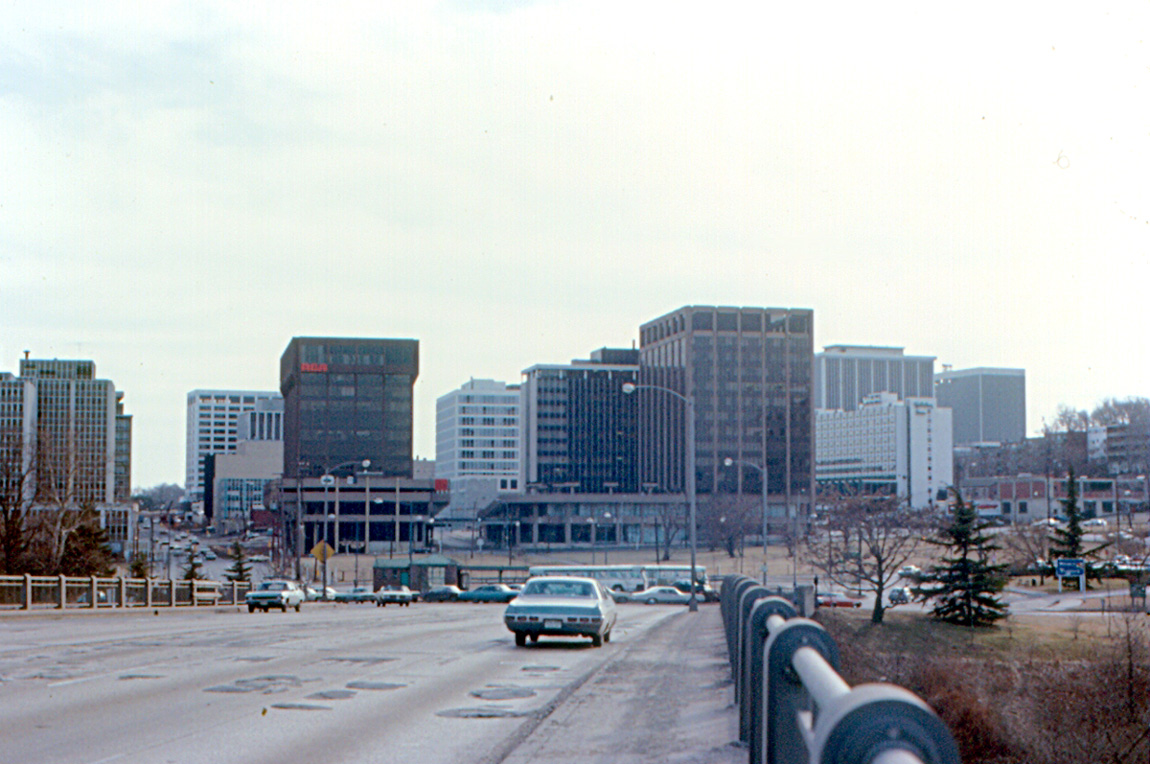
Rosslyn viewed from the Key Bridge in 1970, illustrating increasing densification

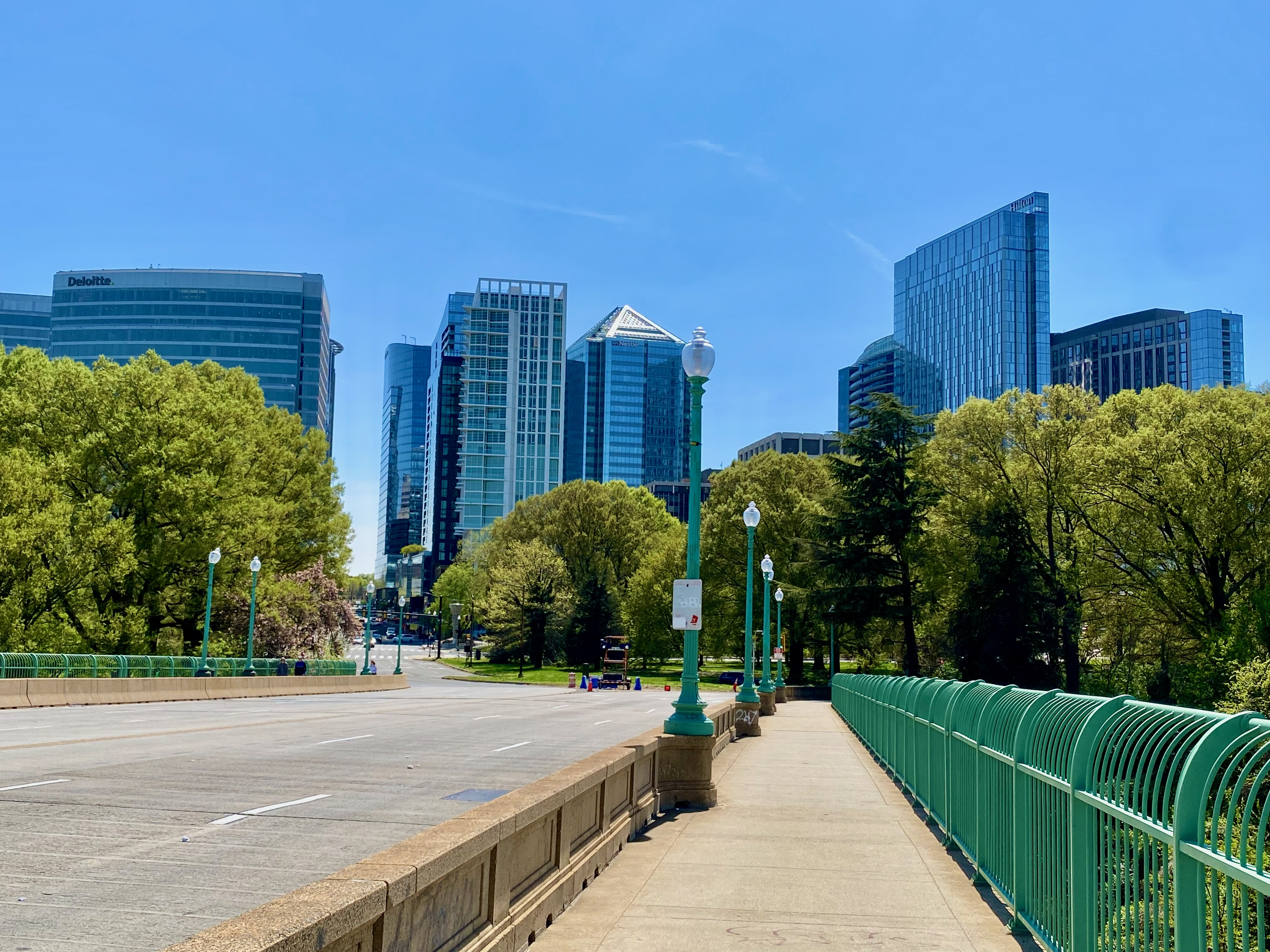
A similar view in 2026, with further commercial development

Following the Arlington county board's success in securing the placement of the anticipated Washington Metro Orange Line from Rosslyn to Ballston, Rosslyn and its adjacent neighborhoods were arranged as urban villages with distinct identities as a part of its "Bull's Eye" planning model, where high-density development would be restricted within a specific radius from Metro stations. Rosslyn was designated as a business district within this vision. Rosslyn's Metro station, which opened in 1979, was designed as a junction between the Orange and Blue lines, the latter of which opened in 1977 with service towards the Pentagon and Alexandria.

Between October 1972 and November 1973, Washington Post journalist Bob Woodward met with Deputy Director of the Federal Bureau of Investigation and whistleblower Mark Felt, at the time code-named "Deep Throat", in a Rosslyn parking garage to exchange classified information about the June 1972 break-in of the Democratic Party's offices at the Watergate complex in Washington. Woodward and fellow reporter Carl Bernstein's subsequent investigation and reporting eventually led to the Watergate Scandal and President Richard Nixon's resignation in 1974. Since 2011, this has been commemorated with a historic plaque on North Nash Street.

The concentration of Rosslyn's initial development efforts on commercial properties eventually concerned county planners, as the neighborhood was often described as a "ghost town" outside of business hours given the lack of apartments. Successive urban plans of Rosslyn from the 1970s envisioned a greater number of residential buildings, a gradual replacement of the area's first generation of skyscrapers with more attractive architecture, and increased green space. This reorientation of Rosslyn towards mixed-use development has continued into the 21st century, which has seen many of its original skyscrapers replaced with newer office buildings, apartments, condos, and hotels. Rosslyn's skywalks, which were installed in the 1960s and were originally intended to separate pedestrians from vehicular traffic, have gradually been demolished as a part of this redevelopment to encourage greater walkability. This period has seen several multinational corporations, including Nestlé in 2017 and CoStar Group in 2024, establishing corporate headquarters in Rosslyn's business district.

== Geography ==
Rosslyn is positioned on the western shore of the Potomac River, and is directly across from the Washington neighborhoods of Georgetown and Foggy Bottom. Theodore Roosevelt Island, Little Island, and the Three Sisters are all adjacent or close to Rosslyn's shoreline. Rosslyn is part of the urbanized Rosslyn-Ballston corridor that follows the Orange and Silver Metro lines, and is of the most densely developed neighborhoods in Arlington County. Rosslyn's boundaries are not officially defined; its Metro Station area is described as being within Interstate 66, North Rhodes Street, 12th Street North, North Meades Street, Arlington Boulevard, and North Arlington Ridge Road. This area encompasses parts of the surrounding neighborhoods of Colonial Village and Radnor/Fort Myer Heights. Joint Base Myer–Henderson Hall and Arlington National Cemetery are located directly to Rosslyn's south.

== Economy ==
Rosslyn is one of Arlington County's main business districts, and hosts over 25,000 employees, most of whom work within professional services, retail, and hospitality. Government agencies and contractors that were historically Rosslyn's primary office tenants have taken up a smaller share of its commercial space since reform efforts such as the U.S. Department of Defense Base Realignment and Closure activities. This has diversified Rosslyn's economy, which in recent years has become home to several corporate headquarters, including those of Costar, Nestle, Deloitte, and Solidcore. In the last several decades, Rosslyn has transitioned into becoming a more mixed-use neighborhood, and is home to over 16,000 residents. This is projected to continue per Rosslyn's 2015 sector plan with 3,000 new housing units planned by 2040. Tourism is also an important component of Rosslyn's economy, which attracts over 1 million annual visitors and is the location of several hotels.

== Arts and culture ==
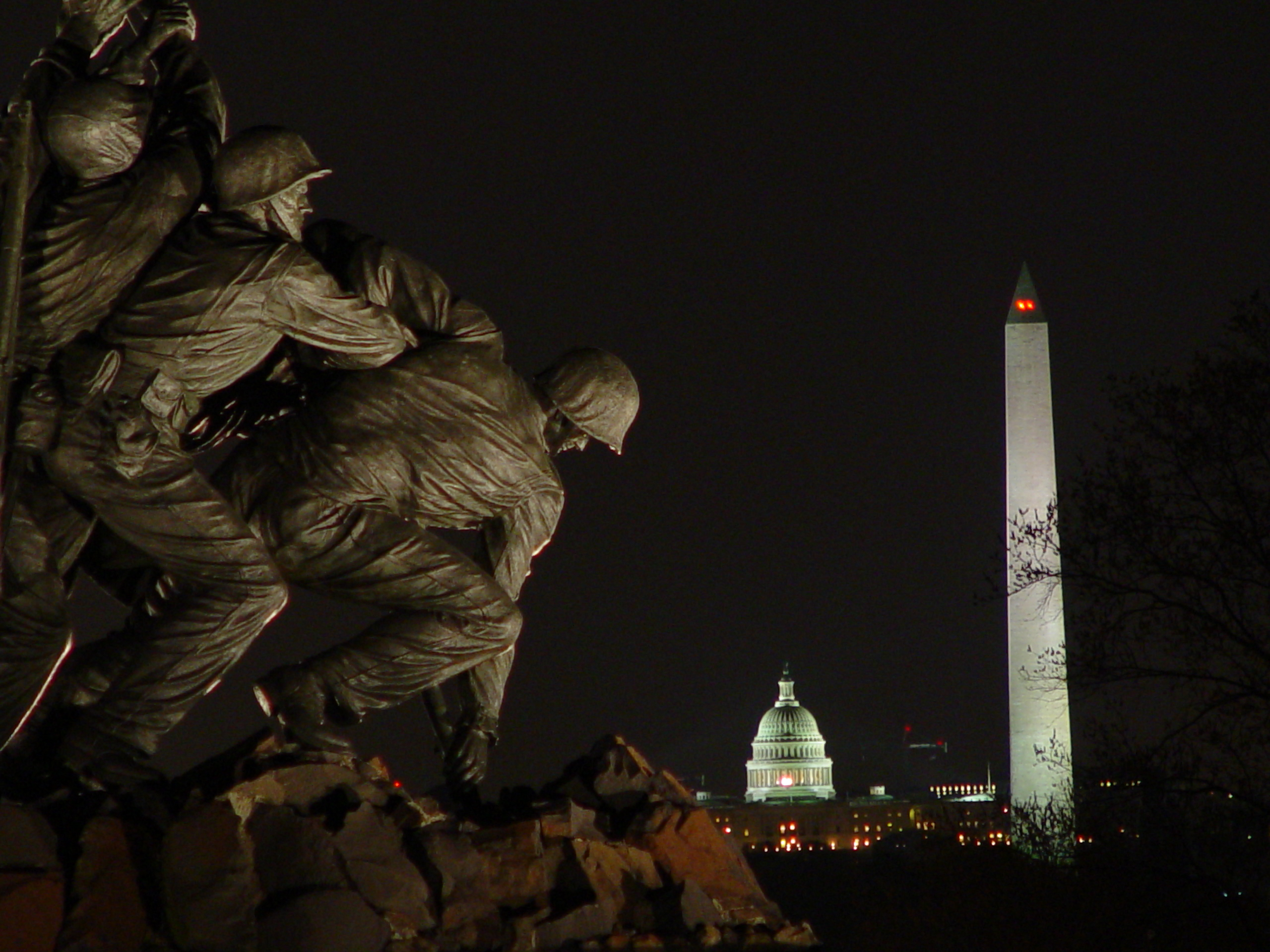
The Marine Corps War Memorial, with the Washington Monument and Washington, D.C. in the background

=== Annual cultural events ===
The Arlington County Government operates the 367-seat Rosslyn Spectrum Theater. Five annual film festivals are held in Rosslyn. The Washington D.C. Independent Film Festival runs for nearly two weeks in March showing independent films from around the world in various locations in and around Washington, DC. In 2011 Rosslyn hosted over 30 film screenings as well as classes, seminars and workshops led by industry professionals.

The Annual NoVa International Jewish Film Festival is held each spring in Rosslyn and other Virginia locations. The Rosslyn Outdoor Film Festival runs in the spring and summer months showing popular films for free in Gateway Park Friday evenings at dusk. Slapsticon is a four-day film festival in July that features silent films, occasionally accompanied by live musicians, as well as early films with audio tracks. The Rosebud Film & Video Festival is an all day event in November that features original works by regional film and video makers. The Rosslyn Jazz Festival, started in 1991, attracted 10,000 attendees in 2006. The annual US FreedomWalk Festival, started in 2000, draws walkers from around the world each Fall for a weekend of walks in Rosslyn and nearby areas.

=== Education ===
Rosslyn is part of Arlington Public School, the public school district for Arlington County, Virginia.

The Art Institute of Washington is located at North Fort Myer Drive. Rosslyn is a location for some of the University of Virginia's business programs, including McIntire School of Commerce Master of Science in the Management of Information Technology at the Waterview Conference Center, and Darden School of Business Master of Business Administration's Executive/Global Executive at the Rosslyn Twin Towers.

=== Museums and other points of interest ===
The Marine Corps War Memorial in Rosslyn is visited by over one million annually. Among these visitors are audiences for the Sunset Parades performed Tuesday evenings during the summer months by the United States Marine Drum and Bugle Corps with the Marine Corps Silent Drill Platoon. Crowds also gather at the Memorial on the 4th of July to watch the national fireworks display.

The Netherlands Carillon in Rosslyn is a set of 50 bells housed in a 12-story tower between Arlington National Cemetery and the Marine Corps War Memorial. The carillon is a gift from the Netherlands to the US in recognition of support received during World War II. Originally installed with 49 bells, a 50th was added by the Netherlands in 1995 on the 50th anniversary of the liberation of the Netherlands. Each spring the grounds are planted with thousands of tulips imported from the Netherlands. During the summer months carilloneurs play concerts on the bells using a keyboard located in the tower. The tower is occasionally open to the public and offers views of the national monuments in Washington, DC, the Marine Corps War Memorial, and Arlington National Cemetery.

The Artisphere, an arts center supported by Arlington County, occupied a distinctive domed building formerly part of the Newseum from 2011 to 2015. After closing, it was remodeled to become a coworking venue.

== Infrastructure ==
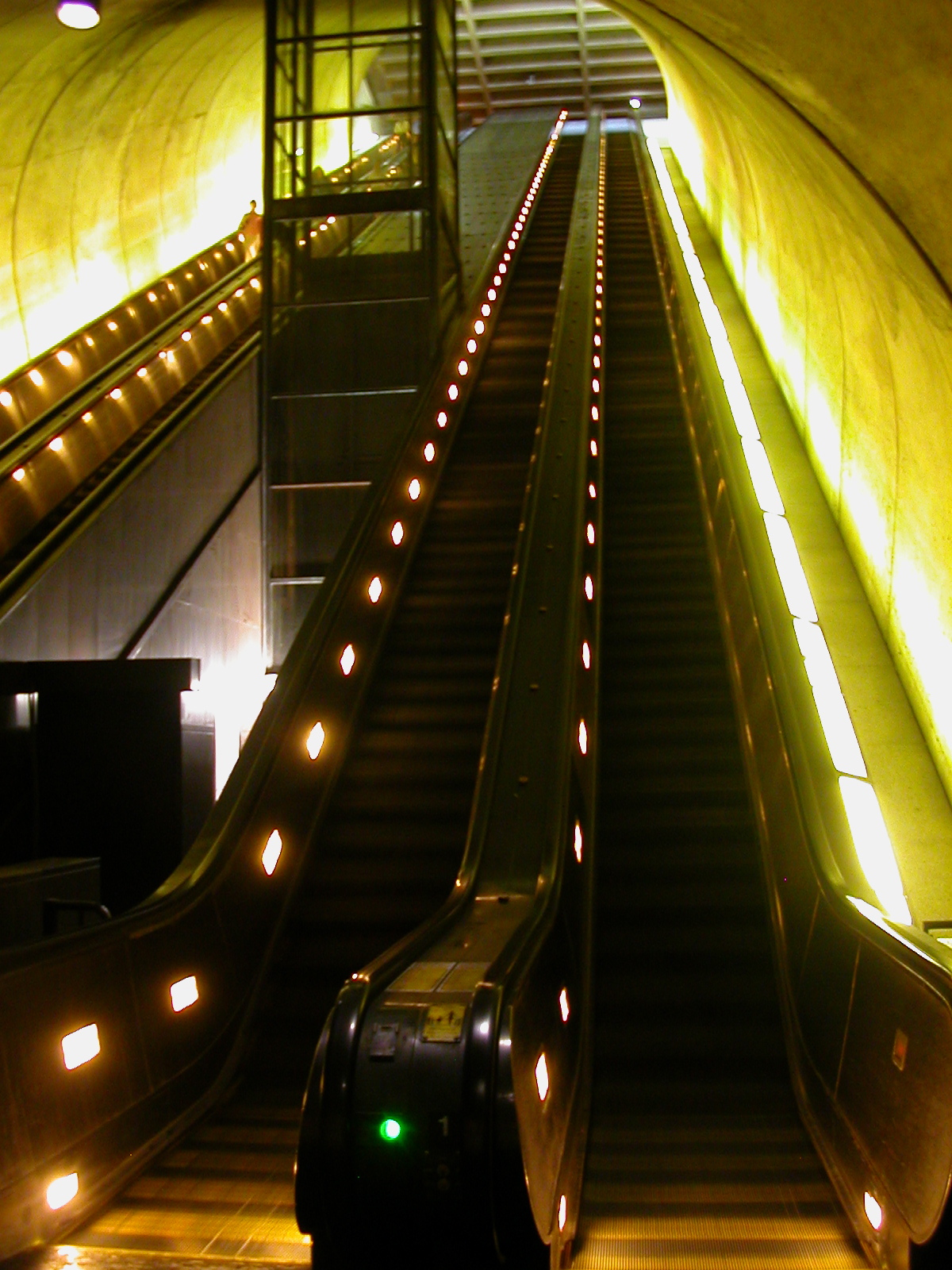
The escalator to street level at the Rosslyn station, the third-longest continuous span escalator in the world

Several major thoroughfares and highways run through Rosslyn, including Interstate 66, U.S. Route 50, U.S. Route 29, George Washington Memorial Parkway, Wilson Boulevard, and Clarendon Boulevard. The Key Bridge, a historic six-lane reinforced concrete arched bridge, connects Rosslyn to Georgetown. Protected bike lanes exist along sections of Clarendon and Wilson Boulevards. Rosslyn has two shared-use paths, the Custis Trail and Mount Vernon Trail; the former follows Interstate 66, while the latter runs along the riverbank of the Potomac River.

=== Public transit ===
Rosslyn has 12 Capital Bikeshare stations. Rosslyn Metro station acts as a junction between the Orange, Silver, and Blue Lines. The neighborhood is served by the following Metrobus and ART bus routes:

- Metrobus A58: Wilson Blvd-Farragut Sq
- Metrobus A76: Carlin Springs Rd
- Metrobus F62: Rosslyn-Arlington Blvd-Dunn Loring
- ART 43: Courthouse - Rosslyn - Crystal City
- ART 45: Columbia Pike - DHS/Sequoia - Rosslyn
- ART 55: East Falls Church - Langston Blvd. - Rosslyn
- ART 56: Military Road - Rosslyn Metro

== In popular culture ==
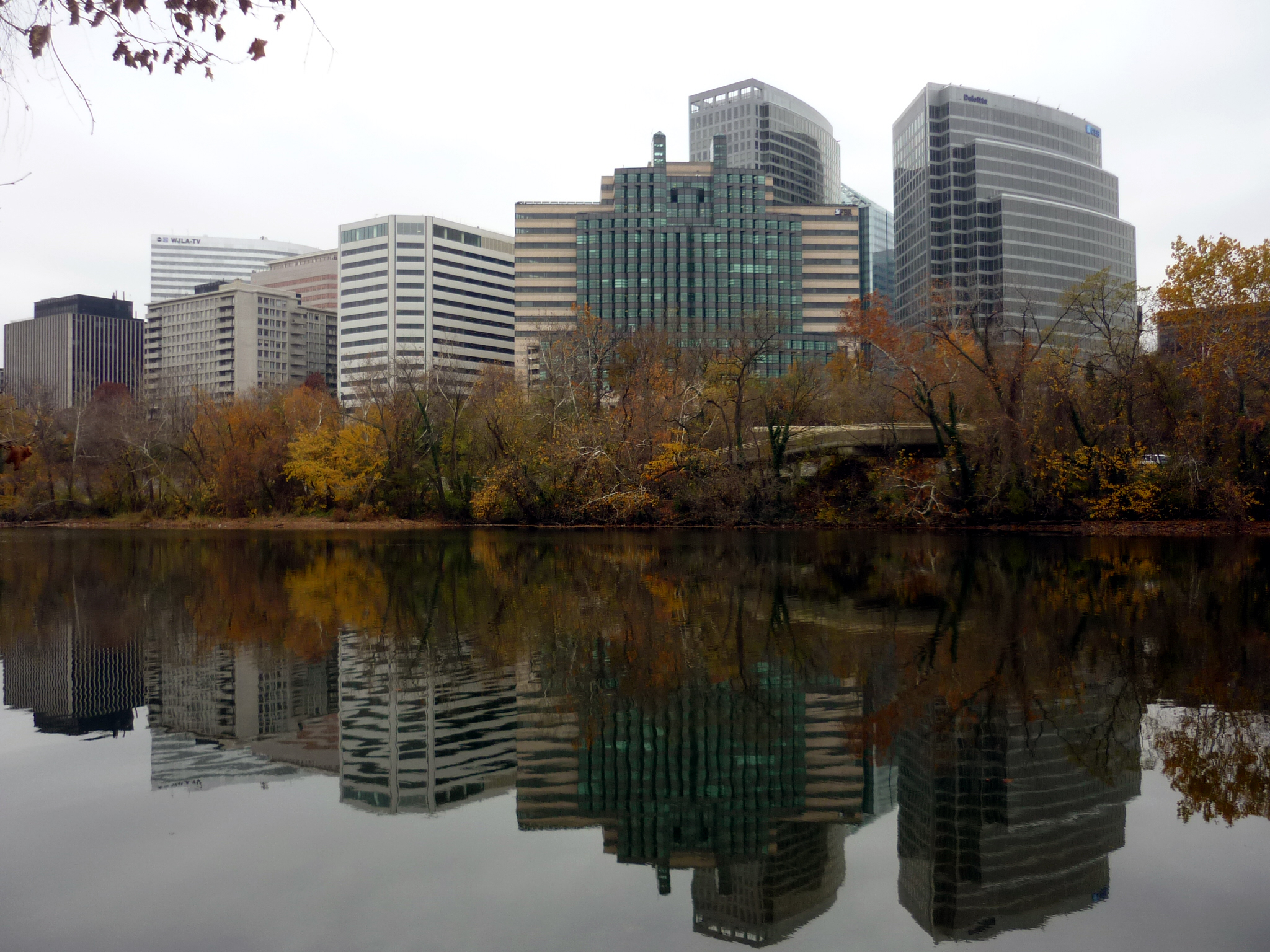
Potomac Tower (center), and Waterview (right), designed by Manhattan-based Pei Cobb Freed & Partners

The following media feature Rosslyn in some way, usually by showing its distinctive skyline.

=== Movies ===
- All the President's Men (1976)
- True Lies (1994)
- Minority Report (2002)
- Mission: Impossible III (2006)
- Transformers: Revenge of the Fallen (2009)
- Captain America: The Winter Soldier (2014)

=== Music ===
- Rosslyn Mountain Boys (1977)

=== Television ===
- The West Wing (1999–2006)
- Bones (2005–2017)
- House of Cards (2013–2018)
- The Walking Dead (2016)

== Bibliography ==
- Bestebreurtje, Lindsey (2024). Built by the People Themselves: African American Community Development in Arlington, Virginia, from the Civil War through Civil Rights. Columbia: The University of South Carolina Press. ISBN 978-1-64336-498-8.
- County of Arlington, Virginia (July 2015). Rosslyn Sector Plan (PDF). Arlington, Virginia: Arlington County Department of Community Planning, Housing and Development, Planning Division.
- Deines, Ann (October 1995). "A Survey of the Development of Arlington County, Virginia, 1940 - 1965" (PDF). Arlington Historical Magazine. 10 (3).
- Tennyson, E. L. (October 1984). "The History of Arlington County's Electric Railways" (PDF). Arlington Historical Magazine. 7 (4): 39–48.
