= Frank Lyon =

American lawyer, newspaper publisher and land developer (1867–1953)

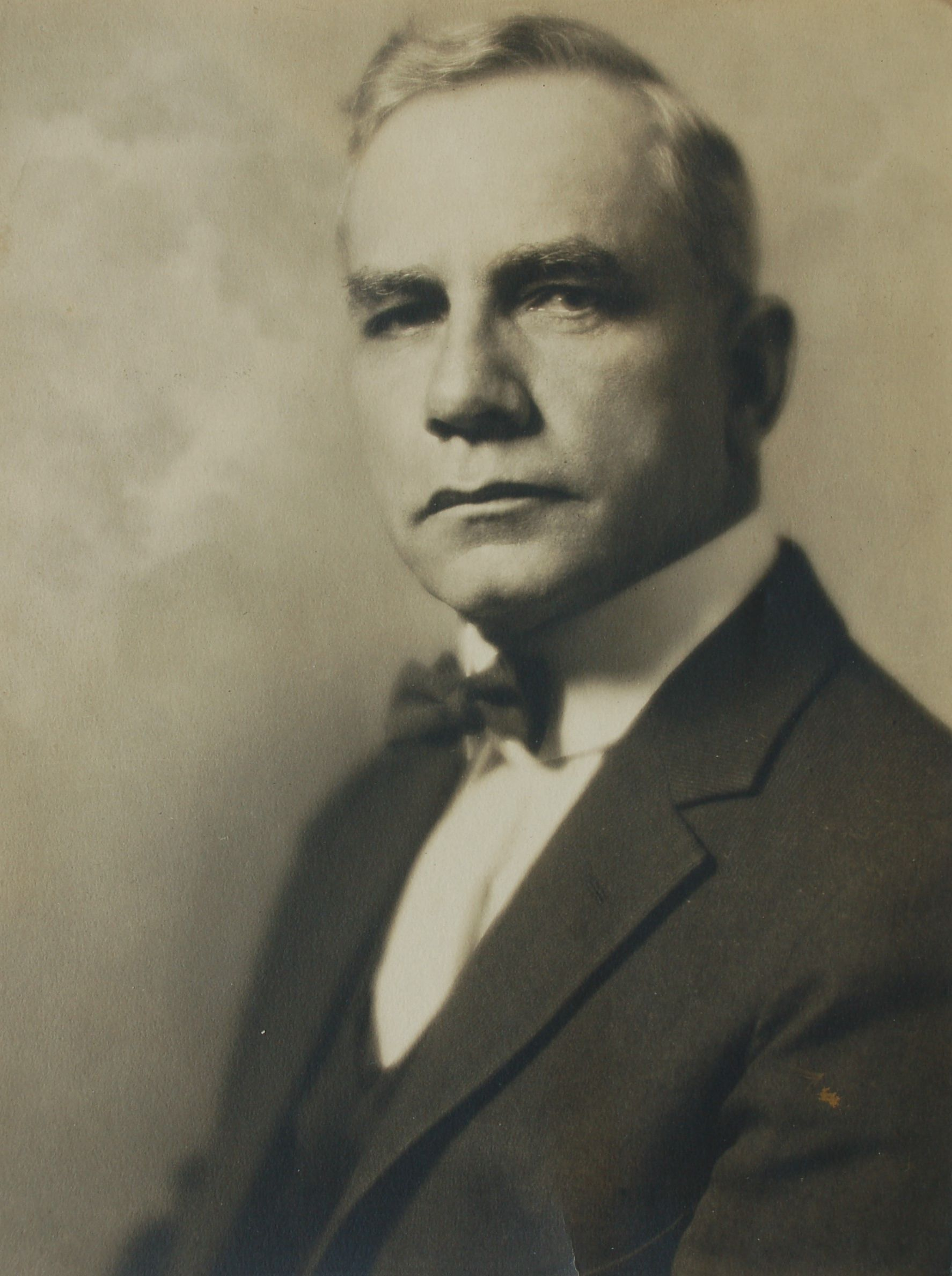
- Lyon (c. 1930)
- Born: December 30, 1867; Petersburg, Virginia, U.S.
- Died: November 29, 1955 (aged 87); Washington, D.C., U.S.
- Resting place: Blandford Cemetery; Petersburg, Virginia, U.S.
- Education: Richmond College
- Alma mater: Georgetown University Law Center (LLB, LLM)
- Occupations: Lawyer; newspaper publisher; land developer
- Spouse: Georgie Hays Wright (m. 1889)
- Children: 4
- Relatives: LeRoy Springs Lyon (brother)

Frank Lyon (December 30, 1867 – November 29, 1955) was an American lawyer, newspaper publisher and land developer in Arlington County, Virginia. He developed the land in modern-day Clarendon, Lyon Park and Lyon Village.

== Early life and education ==
Frank Lyon was born on December 30, 1867, in Petersburg, Virginia, to Mary Margaret (née Springs) and John Lyon. His siblings included army officer LeRoy Springs Lyon. His father was a lawyer in Petersburg and served in the office of the Advocate General of the Confederacy during the Civil War. The family moved to Richmond in 1875. He was educated in public schools in Richmond and graduated high school in 1884. He attended Richmond College for 18 months.

Later when Lyon moved to Washington, D.C., he attended Georgetown University Law School. He graduated with a Bachelor of Laws in 1889 and a Master of Laws in 1890. He was also a member of Beta Theta Pi.

== Career ==
=== Early career ===
After Richmond College, Lyon worked as a clerk for the Richmond and Danville Railroad Company in Charlotte, North Carolina. He later transferred to Richmond and worked as a private secretary to a railroad official. In 1886, the Southern Railroad was formed and Lyon moved to Washington, D.C. to work in its offices.

On June 1, 1887, Lyon became a private secretary to Walter L. Bragg of Alabama, a commissioner of the Interstate Commerce Commission (ICC). He then became a stenographer with the ICC and remained there until 1899. After studying at Georgetown, Lyon served from 1900 to 1902 as a stenographer for the Constitutional Convention of Virginia.

=== Law and public career ===
Around 1902, Lyon began to practice law in Alexandria County, Virginia. Between 1901 and 1906, Lyon started to publish the Alexandria County Monitor and continued with the paper until 1928. The paper was used to combat gambling and liquor in Rosslyn. Lyon argued legal cases against the open sale of liquor and open saloons in Alexandria County. He also participated in the raids in Rosslyn and Jackson City in May 1904 with Crandal Mackey.

In 1907, Commissioner Franklin K. Lane of the ICC appointed Lyon to the semi-judicial position of examiner. In 1912, he resigned this position to practice exclusively before the ICC in matters concerning steamship lines and coal companies.

=== Land development career ===
Lyon then became a law partner with Robert W. Moore. He became involved in the development of Moore's Addition to Clarendon and then bought out Moore's interest in the property and started his own development firm. When Lyon sold land in Clarendon, he would have the buyer agree that "liquor shall never be sold or dispensed on the property or from any building erected thereon, nor shall said property be used for the conducting of any business that constitutes a nuisance to other lot owners in the subdivision, such as a soap factory or like industry."

His development firm bore his own name until 1920 when he partnered with C. Walton Fitch. Then, the firm was called Lyon and Finch. Later it was renamed to Lyon Properties Inc. In 1919, Lyon Properties started developing Lyon Park, a project to develop a 300-acre tract of land into 1,200 building lots in Arlington County. The project was completed around 1922. Following the development of Lyon Park, Lyon acquired rights to the tract adjoining Clarendon. In 1923, the firm started development of Lyon Village, a 191-acre tract of land. The properties sold well until the Great Depression in the 1930s. With the depression, Lyon and Fitch dissolved and Fitch moved to Chicago. The firm of Lyon Properties Inc. would continue into the 1940s and the Lyon Village Shopping Center was managed by the Lyon family after Frank Lyon's death.

Lyon used techniques to keep people of color from settling in his developments. These practices included restrictive covenants with buyers to prevent people of color from living on the land, except as servants. He also required housing built on the land he sold to be expensive and designed the streets with cars in mind, not for pedestrians.

In 1933, Lyon turned down a nomination on the Prohibition Party ticket for Lieutenant Governor of Virginia.

== Personal life ==
In 1889, Lyon and Georgie Hays Wright moved to Alexandria County and built a small house on Lubber Run near Ballston, Virginia. They were married on August 5, 1890, near Manassas, Virginia. She was the daughter of John V. Wright, a member of the U.S. Congress, member of the Confederate States Congress, colonel in the Confederate States Army and circuit judge of Columbia, Tennessee. Together, they had three children who survived childhood and one son who died from water pollution:

- Georgie Hays – married Jacob L. Devers
- John – lieutenant in the 29th Infantry Division of World War I. He died on October 16, 1918. John Lyon is remembered on the War Memorial in Clarendon Circle.
- Margaret Springs – married Charles W. Smith, a business associate of Frank Lyon. Their daughter Mary Bittinger and grandson Charles Bittinger III continued the property management business in Arlington County

In the early 1900s, the Lyons moved to the "Ohmstead" House on Kirkwood Road in Arlington County. In 1907, Lyon built a house he called Lyonhurst (now Missonhurst). The family lived there until 1923. In 1923, Lyon moved to Langley, Virginia, and bought 169 acres of land and built a stone house called Ballantrae on the land. Due to the depression, Lyon had to sell Ballantrae and instead moved into Hickory Hill, a house on the same tract of land he purchased in Langley.

== Death ==
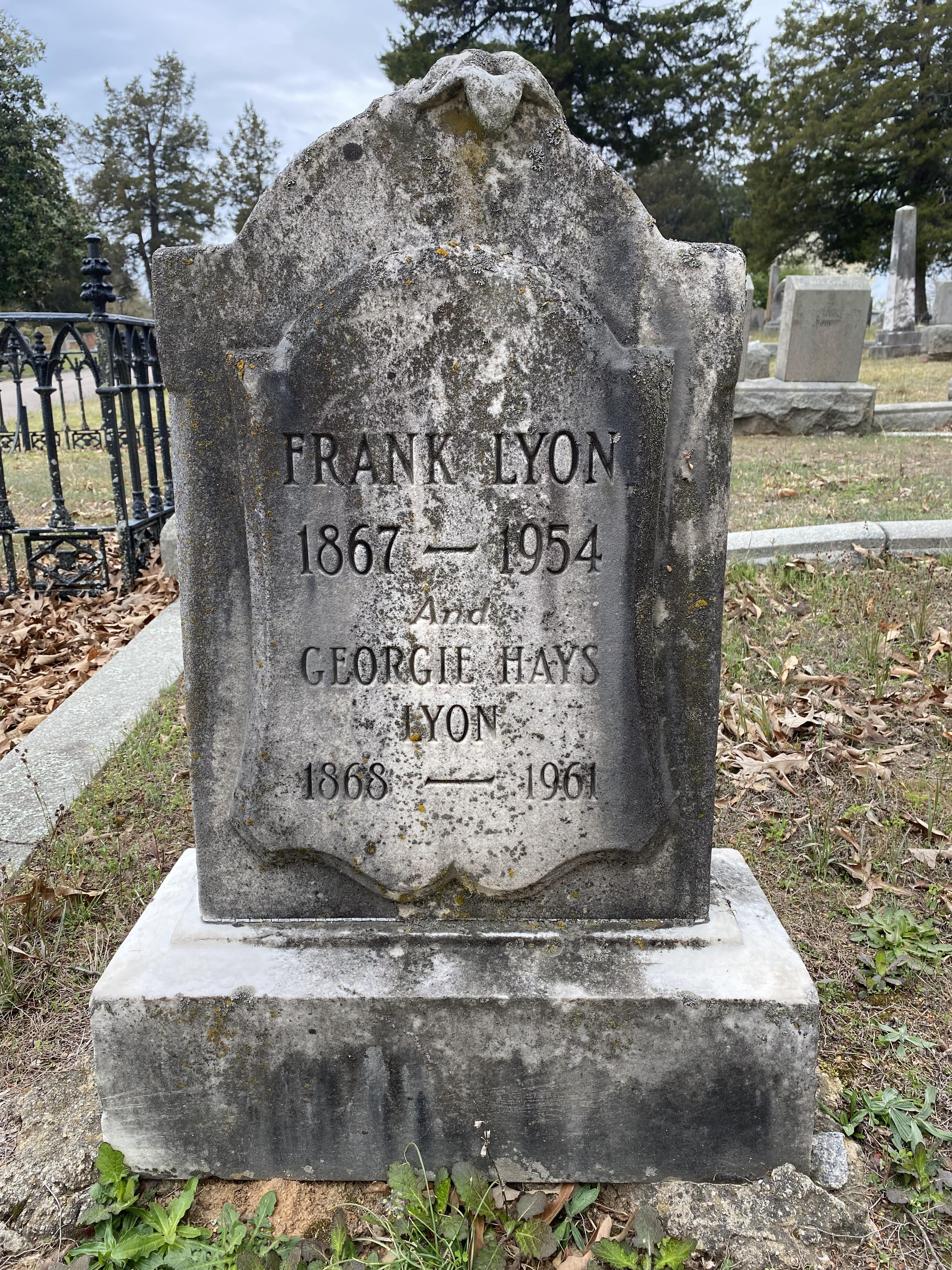
Grave of Frank Lyon at Blandford Cemetery

Lyon died on November 29, 1955, at the Georgetown University Hospital in Washington, D.C. He was buried at Blandford Cemetery in Petersburg, Virginia.

== Legacy ==
Lyon Hall, a restaurant in Clarendon, was named after Frank Lyon. He built the Streamline Moderne building in the mid-1940s. It was previously called the Dan Kain Building, and the restaurant took over the space in 2010.
