= Crandal Mackey =

American lawyer (1867–1953)

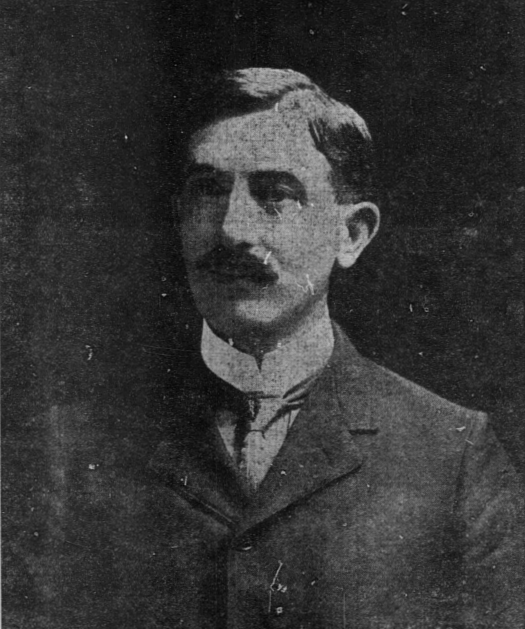
- Mackey, c. 1904
- Born: December 15, 1865; Shreveport, Louisiana, U.S.
- Died: March 31, 1957 (aged 91); Rosslyn, Virginia, U.S.
- Resting place: Arlington National Cemetery
- Education: North Carolina Military Institute; Randolph Macon College
- Alma mater: Georgetown University Law School
- Occupations: Lawyer; commonwealth attorney; newspaper publisher
- Political party: Democratic
- Spouse: Mary
- Children: 7
- Relatives: Thomas Jefferson Mackey (father)
- Military career
- Allegiance: United States
- Conflicts: Spanish–American War

Crandal Mackey (December 15, 1865 – March 31, 1957), sometimes spelled Crandall, was an American lawyer and newspaper publisher. He served as the commonwealth attorney of Alexandria County, Virginia, from 1904 to 1916, and led raids in Rosslyn, Virginia, of gambling dens in 1904.

== Early life ==
Crandal Mackey was born on December 15, 1865, in a Confederate ambulance in Shreveport, Louisiana, to Thomas Jefferson Mackey and his wife Rosina Lloyd. He could trace his ancestry to James Mackey, who fought in the American Revolutionary War as a sergeant in a South Carolina regiment, and his son John Mackey who fought under Andrew Jackson in the War of 1812. His father had fought in the Palmetto guard during the Mexican American War, as well as served as secretary to Robert Kingston Scott (who would remain loyal to the Union and later served as governor of South Carolina). In 1860, Thomas Mackay and his family lived in the household of Rosina's father, wealthy and prominent Washington DC lawyer Richard Lloyd, for whom they named their eldest son.

However, as the American Civil War began, Thomas Mackey accepted a commission as captain of engineers for the Confederate States Army and moved south, serving on the Staff of General Sterling Price during the conflict. After his civil rights were restored, Mackey allied with Congressional Reconstruction and became a Charleston alderman and trial judge by 1870, and a decade later a judge of the circuit court for South Carolina's 35th district (south of Charlotte, North Carolina).

Thus, the family (which also included brother Beckford also born in 1865, Argyle born in 1868 and T.J. Mackey Jr. born in 1870) moved to rural Chester, South Carolina. Mackey occasionally worked in cotton fields while growing up in South Carolina.

Mackey attended the South Carolina Military Institute as a teenager, but graduated from the North Carolina Military Institute. He attended Randolph Macon College in Virginia and participated in football and boxing while there. The Mackeys family moved back to Washington, D.C. around 1883, as Mackey turned 18. He graduated from the Georgetown University Law School with a law degree in 1889.

== Career ==
In 1885, Mackey was appointed a clerk in the U.S. Department of War. He then became an examiner of pensions and after admission to the bar started to practice law, as well as speculate in real estate in the Trinidad neighborhood. Mackey purchased two acres from a tract which his mother had inherited across the Potomac River and erected a house, Rock Hill, at 1711 22nd Street North in what had become Alexandria County in 1870 (to distinguish it from newly incorporated City of Alexandria) and would become Arlington County, Virginia in 1920.

On June 21, 1898, Mackey interrupted his career to enlist in the U.S. Army. He accepted an appointment as captain of the 10th U.S. Volunteer Infantry Regiment during the Spanish–American War. After the war, Mackey returned to practicing law in the Washington, D.C. area.

By 1900, Mackey lived in Virginia and became involved in Democratic politics, as a "southern progressive". In the summer of 1901 he attended the party's convention in Norfolk, and opposed Claude Swanson (who lost that gubernatorial bid). Mackey started making a name for himself by accepting labor rights cases against the government and railways, as Arlington was rapidly becoming a streetcar suburb of the national capital.

In 1904, he challenged the incumbent commonwealth attorney of Alexandria County, Virginia, Richard (Dick) Johnston, using the banner of the Good Citizens League and lambasting gambling (his home was just west of Rossyln, which had become a hotbed of gambling and vice). Mackey won by two votes, and an election contest ended abruptly at Johnston's insistence. He assumed office in January 1904 and was re-elected twice times, serving until 1916. Starting in May 1904, commonwealth attorney, Mackey led raids on gambling dens and houses in Rosslyn, Jackson City and St. Asaph Racetrack. Local publisher and developer Frank Lyon also attended those raids. The raids caused gambling houses in Rosslyn and Jackson City to shutter, including the St. Asaph's poolroom. After the Rosslyn sites were closed, St. Asaph's continued, and Alexandria County also had amusement areas with occasional vice issues called "High View" near Pimmit Run upstream along the Potomac River, and "Luna Park" near Four Mile Run downstream near the Alexandria border.

One of Mackey's most reported cases involved a murder on the Long Bridge into the District of Columbia, and Governor Swanson commuted the death sentence of Joseph Wright, a former slave from Loudoun County, to life imprisonment. Although challenged, Mackey was re-elected by a substantial margin. He considered challenging Charles C. Carlin (who had represented the St. Asaph Racetrack) for congress, but ultimately decided to continue fighting gambling and vice nearer home, and received an endorsement from the Progressive League for a third term in 1911. He defeated challenger Richard Moncure by 692 to 439 votes. With the assistance of Governor Andrew Jackson Montague, Mackey (unsuccessfully) fought the City of Alexandria's annexation of the Del Ray neighborhood, and also challenged the crowded service of the Great Falls and Old Dominion Railway. However in 1915, Mackey faced the most serious challenge of his career, with four serious challengers and allegations that he had created a courthouse crowd and a "holy roller" reputation for the county. Mackey withdrew from the contest in October, and Frank L. Ball won in a landslide, with 68% of the votes, with Charles Thomas Jessee, endorsed by the 'Monitor' newspaper receiving only 9% of the vote.

After giving up his job as prosecutor, Mackey became editor and publisher of a newspaper in Arlington called The Chronicle.

Mackey opposed the county manager style of government that Arlington County voters approved by a 2 to 1 margin in 1930. That year, he made his last run for public office, on a platform of states' rights and calling for the repeal of the 18th Amendment in favor of statewide control of liquor. Mackey came in fourth in the Democratic primary for VIrginia's 8th congressional district in August 1930. The winner (and of the general election) was Alexandria lawyer and judge Howard W. Smith, also the only candidate not to focus on Prohibition issues.

Mackey was one of the charter members of the Arlington County Bar Association. He was also a director of the Arlington National Bank and the National Mortgage and Investment Company. He was one of the organizers of the Arlington Trust Company and was a member of the Board of Trustees of George Washington University.

== Personal life ==
Mackey married Mary, and had seven children, including Argyle, Joseph, Darlington, Thomas, Alice and Virginia. Mackey lived on a hill above Rosslyn called "Mackey's Hill". He and his family were in an automobile accident in 1912, but Mackey was able to jump out of his car before it fell over an embankment. He later broke his hip in an automobile accident in 1951.

== Death and legacy ==
Mackey died on March 31, 1957, and was buried at Arlington National Cemetery, as had been his father. Virginia would later assume statewide control over liquor, a stance that Mackey supported later in his career.

Arlington County named a 70,000 square foot park after Mackey on the block where Mackey shut down gambling houses. In 2014, Crandal Mackey Park was replaced by the Central Place housing development.
