= St. Asaph Racetrack =

Horse racing facility

St. Asaph Racetrack was a horse racing facility that operated from the late 1800s until 1905 in the Del Ray neighborhood of Alexandria, Virginia.

Built under the name Gentlemen's Driving Club at St Asaph, the track was renamed St. Asaph Racetrack after an 1894 renovation. The track was a flashpoint for powerful pro- and anti-gambling political interests. In May 1904, the track was raided by Virginia Attorney General Crandal Mackey, who smashed the gambling equipment and arrested the owners. Anti-gambling forces finally prevailed and the track closed in 1905.

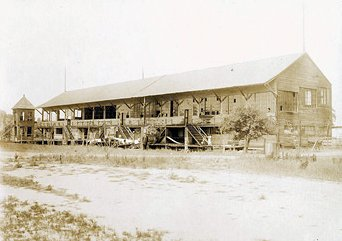
St Asaph Racetrack in Alexandria, Virginia, in 1902
