= List of crossings of Four Mile Run =

This is a complete list of current bridges and other crossings of Four Mile Run from its mouth at the Potomac River to its source.

== Crossings ==
All locations are in Virginia. Pedestrian-only bridges are marked in italics.

Image	Crossing	Opened	Coordinates	Notes
Arlington–Alexandria
	George Washington Memorial Parkway / Mount Vernon Trail	1980	38.8410°N 77.0479°W	
	WMATA Yellow and Blue Lines	1983	38.8409°N 77.0485°W	
	CSX Transportation RF&P Subdivision	1980	38.8409°N 77.0488°W	Originally Potomac Yard rail bridge
	Potomac Avenue	1980	38.8408°N 77.0493°W	Originally Potomac Yard rail bridge
	Short Bridge Park (disused)	1980	38.8408°N 77.0504°W	Originally Potomac Yard rail bridge
	demolished rail bridge	1980	38.8407°N 77.0516°W	Originally Potomac Yard rail bridge; demolished in 2013
	Short Bridge Park footbridge	1980	38.8407°N 77.0521°W	Originally Potomac Yard rail bridge
	US 1 (Richmond Highway)	1980	38.8407°N 77.0524°W	
	Washington, Alexandria, and Mount Vernon Electric Railway Bridge	1896	38.8409°N 77.0555°W	Removed sometime between 1932 and 1943.
	Mt. Vernon Avenue	1958	38.8446°N 77.0647°W	Reconstructed 1981
	W. Glebe Road	1957	38.8436°N 77.0772°W	Reconstruction of the superstructure of the bridge began in May 2022 and was completed in August 2023. The new bridge will reuse the existing piers and create more space for cyclists and pedestrians.
	I-395 (Henry G. Shirley Memorial Highway)	1973	38.8431°N 77.0825°W	Reconstructed 2018
	Shirlington Road	1973	38.8432°N 77.0857°W	
Arlington
	Jennie Dean Park footbridge (aka "The S. Nelson Street bridge")	1986		Rehabilitated in 2023-2024
	S. Walter Reed Drive	1974		Former bridge destroyed by Hurricane Agnes in 1972
	Barcroft Park footbridge			
	Barcroft Park footbridge	2009		
	S. George Mason Drive	1966		
	Four Mile Run Trail	~1974-76		
	SR 244 (Columbia Pike)	1940		Widened in 1958. Reconstructed in 2001
	Four Mile Run Trail			
	Four Mile Run Trail			
	Four Mile Run Trail	1967		
	Glencarlyn Park footbridge	2022		Previous bridge destroyed in a flood in July 2019, new bridge opened in 2022
	Glencarlyn Park Playground footbridge			Destroyed in flood in July 2019
	Four Mile Run Trail	1967		
	Washington & Old Dominion Trail	1984		Span was built atop the extant abutments dating back to the 1850s
	Washington & Old Dominion Trail	1984		Span was built atop the extant abutments dating back to the 1850s
	Abandoned Four Mile Run Trail	1967		Visible in bottom of the photo. Unsure when it was abandoned.
	Washington & Old Dominion Trail	1984		Span was built atop the extant abutments dating back to the 1850s
	US 50 (Arlington Boulevard)	1987		
	footbridge to N. Greenbrier Street			
	Washington & Old Dominion Trail	2001		Ribbon Cutting for section of trail on May 11, 2002.
	N. Carlin Springs Road	1987		
	Bluemont Park footbridge			
	Bluemont Park footbridge			
	Bluemont Junction Trail	1990		
	Washington & Old Dominion Trail	1991		
	Wilson Boulevard	1994		
	Bon Air Park footbridge			Destroyed in flood in July 2019
	Washington & Old Dominion Trail	1984		
	Patrick Henry Drive	1982		This is the first bridge at this location. It was built in coordination with I-66 and with space for the bike trail beneath. Originally this was going to be a cloverleaf intersection, but Arlington County opposed it due to the park space and homes it would need to take.
	McKinley Road Bridge	~1950		Originally, McKinley connected across Four Mile Run and the railroad. Part of the road was removed and the bridge became a bicycle/pedestrian trail when I-66 was built.
	N. Ohio Street	1981		Constructed as part of the I-66 project to replace the removal of Mckinley.
	Four Mile Run Trail	1967		
	Washington & Old Dominion Trail; I-66 (Custis Memorial Parkway)	1982		Culvert crosses W&OD Trail, but enters and exits on same side of Interstate 66
	East Falls Church Park footbridge	2012		Replaced older bridge slightly downstream
	N. Sycamore Street	1971		
	Washington & Old Dominion Trail/Banneker Park	Prior to 1981		In 2020 the railings on the bridge were replaced.
Falls Church
	N. Van Buren Street	2018		Replaced older bridge
	US 29 (N. Washington Street)			
Arlington–Falls Church
	Driveway to Arlington Fire Station 6	1990		
Arlington
	Washington & Old Dominion Trail	1982		
	Little Falls Road / 26th Street N / Fairfax Drive	1970		Culvert under residential neighborhood
	I-66 (Custis Memorial Parkway); WMATA Orange, Blue, and Silver Lines; Williamsburg Boulevard	1982		Culvert under freeway
Fairfax County
	Gordon Avenue			Gordon Avenue originally had a gap where Four Mile Run was but by 1977 it was closed, with a culvert for the run, to replace connections lost by the construction of I-66.
