= Custis Trail =

Shared use path in Arlington County, Virginia

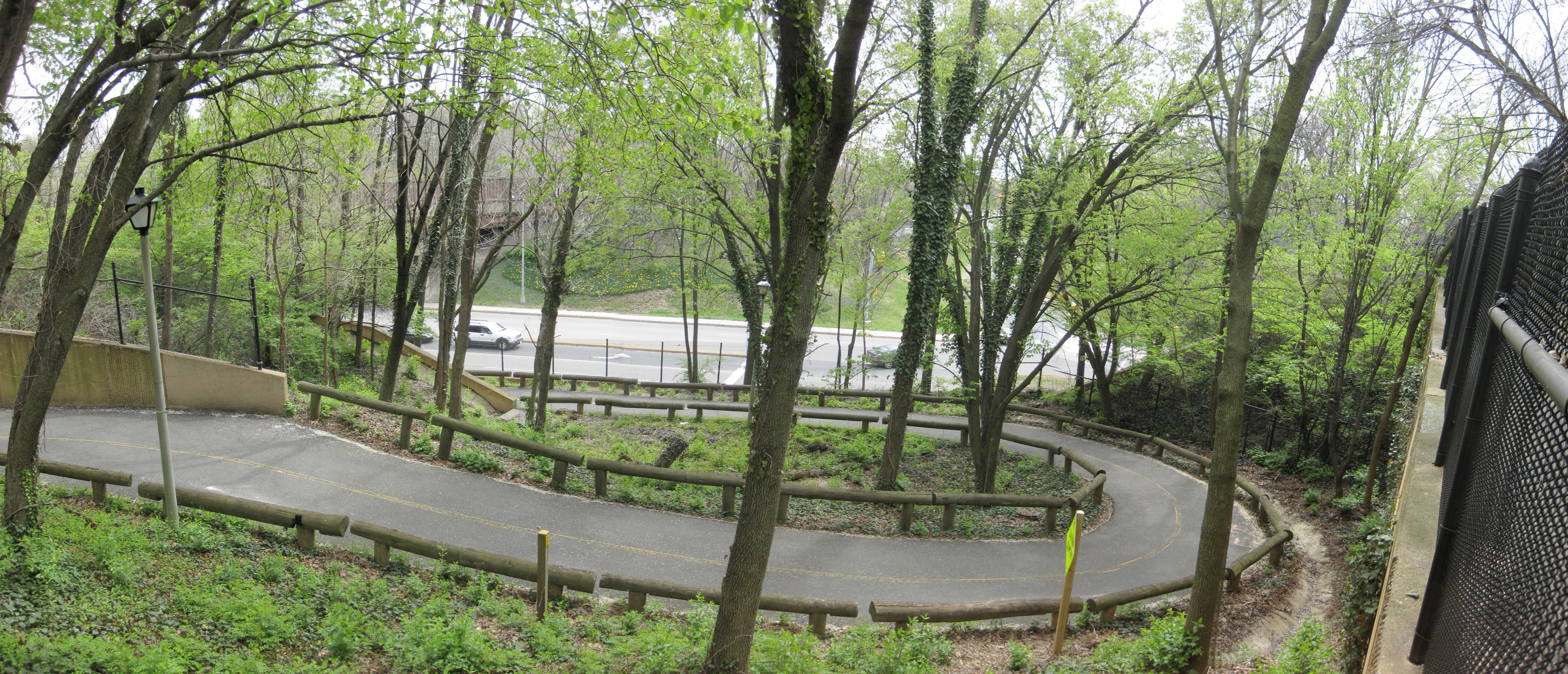
- A winding path along the Custis Trail in Arlington, Virginia
- Length: 4.5 mi (7.2 km)
- Location: Arlington County, Virginia, U.S.
- Established: 1988
- Designation: Shared use path
- Trailheads: Eastern: West end of trail bridge over George Washington Memorial Parkway 38°53′53″N 77°04′06″W; Western: Intersection with Washington & Old Dominion Railroad Trail 38°52′45″N 77°08′20″W
- Use: Biking, running, walking
- Grade: moderate climbs; trail elevation increases from east to west
- Difficulty: moderate eastbound; moderate to strenuous westbound
- Season: All
- Months: All
- Sights: Trees and shrubs near trail. Distant views on overpasses.
- Hazards: Street crossings in first 0.7 mi (1.1 km) from eastern trailhead, especially at: N. Lynn Street 38°53′57″N 77°04′15″W; N. Fort Myer Drive 38°53′57″N 77°04′19″W Winding trail: Multiple blind curves on hills adjacent to highway sound walls near street overpasses of I-66. 90 degree turn at base of hill near I-66 overpass of Four Mile Run and western trailhead 38°52′46″N 77°08′10″W.
- Surface: Asphalt
- Website: http://bikewashington.org/trails/wad/custis.htm

Custis Trail
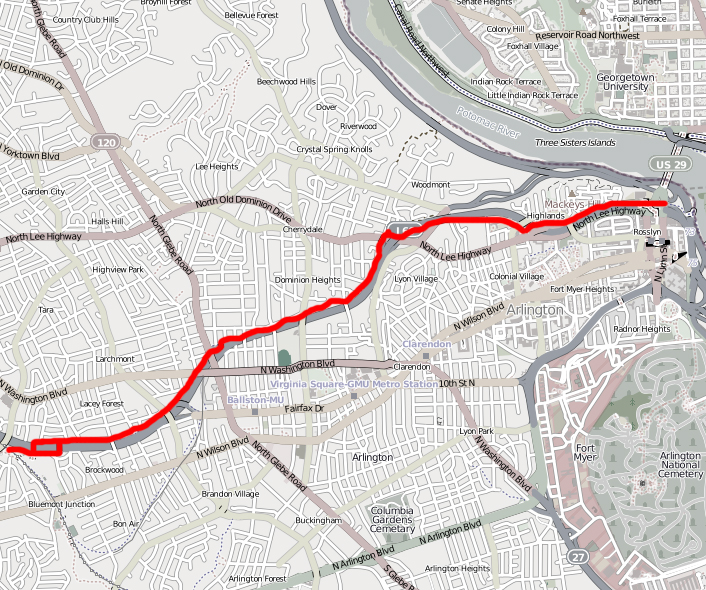
- Map of the Custis Trail

The Custis Trail is a hilly 4.5 miles (7.2 km)-long shared use path in Arlington County, Virginia. The asphalt-paved trail travels along Interstate 66 (I-66) between Rosslyn and the Washington and Old Dominion Railroad Trail (W&OD Trail) at Bon Air Park.

== History ==
The Virginia Department of Transportation (VDOT) constructed the $2.5 million Custis Trail beside I-66 (named the Custis Memorial Parkway in Virginia east of the Capital Beltway) from 1977 to 1982. VDOT originally did not plan to build the trail, but added it to the I-66 project to help the highway gain federal approval and funding after the federal government rejected the initial plans.

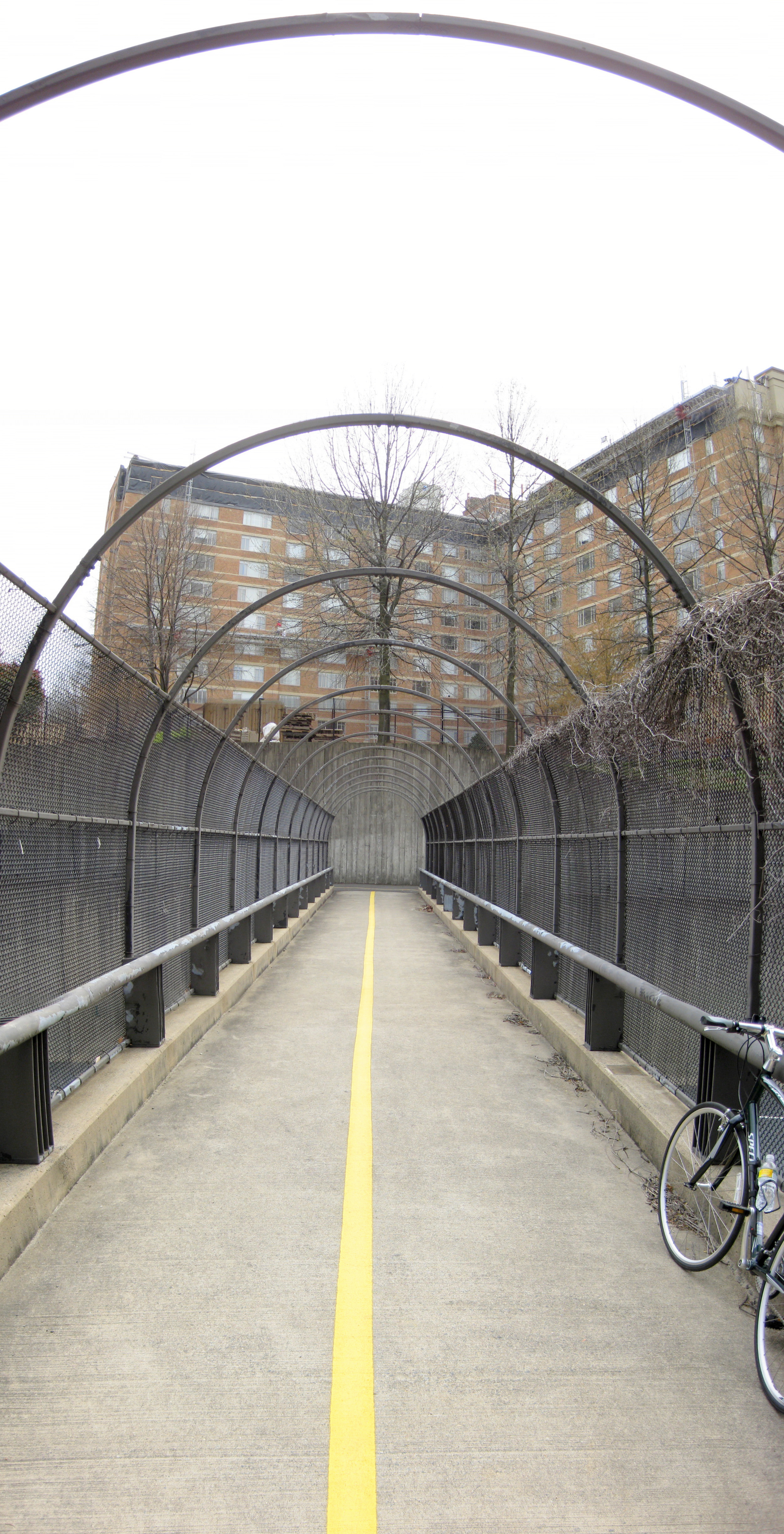
A Custis Trail bridge over I-66

East of Glebe Road (Virginia State Route 120), I-66 and the Custis Trail were both built on and near the former right of way of the Washington and Old Dominion Railroad's Rosslyn spur, which the highway department had purchased in 1962. In late 1972, the county received permission to build a 1.3 mile temporary, natural surface bike trail on the right-of-way east of Spout Run, which was called the Spout Run Bike Trail. The trail was to open by early 1973 and was in place by 1976. The more hilly Custis Trail replaced this relatively flat route, on which I-66 now travels.

On August 8, 1977, VDOT officially began constructing the Custis Trail (or I-66 Trail, as it was originally called) and the section of I-66 in Virginia east of the Beltway. The trail opened during the summer of 1982. In October, VDOT opened most of the new highway to cyclists and pedestrians for one day. VDOT opened the 10 miles (16.1 km) segment of I-66 between the Theodore Roosevelt Bridge and the Capital Beltway to motor vehicle traffic on December 22, 1982.

The Custis Trail originally extended for 8.5 miles (13.7 km) to Lee Highway (U.S. Route 29) in East Falls Church (see List of neighborhoods in Arlington County, Virginia). However, the section of the Custis Trail that travels between Bon Air Park and East Falls Church was later informally re-branded to become a part of the W&OD Trail.

On June 11, 1988, an extension of the trail and a bridge over the George Washington Memorial Parkway opened at the trail's eastern end. The extension and the bridge connected the trail to the Mount Vernon Trail, a 17 miles (27 km)-long shared use path that travels along the Parkway near the west side of the Potomac River to Alexandria and George Washington's home at Mount Vernon.

In 2018–19, VDOT, in cooperation with the Arlington County government, removed a lane of Lee Highway near the eastern end of the trail (between North Lynn Street and North Oak Street). The lane's removal enabled VDOT and the county to increase the width of that section of the trail from 10 feet (3.0 m) to 16 feet (4.9 m) and to widen the trail's buffer from 3 feet (0.9 m) feet to 8 feet (2.4 m).

== Description ==
The Custis Trail's eastern trailhead is at the trail's lowest elevation (33 feet (10.1 m)). The trail connects at the trailhead to the Mount Vernon Trail, which provides access to three Potomac River crossings into downtown Washington, D.C., and the National Mall:

- Theodore Roosevelt Bridge
- Arlington Memorial Bridge
- George Mason Memorial Bridge (see 14th Street bridges)

250 yards (229 m) west of the trailhead, the Custis Trail connects at North Lynn Street to the Francis Scott Key Bridge, thus creating connections to Georgetown, to the southern end of the Capital Crescent Trail and to the Chesapeake and Ohio Canal towpath. The trail then follows a hilly route along I-66 through Arlington County until reaching its western trailhead at the trail's junction with the Washington & Old Dominion Railroad Trail (W&OD Trail) at Bon Air Park near Four Mile Run. The western trailhead is 75 yards (69 m) east of North Patrick Henry Drive's overpass of I-66, the W&OD Trail and Four Mile Run.

The trail reaches its highest elevation (299 feet (91.1 m)) near the North Harrison Street overpass of I-66 and the trail, west of Ballston. The trail descends from that high point to the western trailhead, whose elevation is 233 feet (71.0 m).

The Custis Trail crosses I-66 three times along its route:

- Within the Lee Highway overpass west of Rosslyn.
- Within the Lee Highway underpass west of Spout Run Parkway (Virginia State Route 124).
- Within the Four Mile Run underpass near the trail's western trailhead.

The trail has five at-grade street crossings, all of which in a section of the trail that travels next to the westbound traffic lanes of Lee Highway in and near Rosslyn. After the trail crosses I-66 on the Lee Highway overpass west of Rosslyn, the trail travels next to I-66 and crosses all streets on the highway's underpasses and overpasses.

The trail has a 300-yard (274 m)-long spur that travels east to Fairfax Drive (Virginia State Route 237) along the westbound entrance ramp to I-66 in Ballston. The spur connects to Ballston's streets and to the Bluemont Junction Trail, a 1.3-mile (2.1 km)-long rail trail that meets the W&OD Trail and the Four Mile Run Trail at Bluemont Park in Bluemont, Arlington.

== Name ==
Web pages and other sources sometimes identify the Custis Trail as the "Nellie Custis Trail" or the "Martha Custis Trail". However, no documents show that the trail ever bore the name of any specific individual. In 1980, there were discussions of naming I-66 for the Custis family, to which George Washington was related by marriage.

At the time that I-66 was opening east of the Capital Beltway, Virginia highway officials were unofficially calling that section of the road the "Martha Custis Parkway". In 1981, at least one columnist thought the road - and by extension the trail - was being specifically named for Nellie Custis.

The section of I-66 east of the Beltway eventually received the name "Custis Memorial Parkway". Several Arlington County documents have therefore identified the trail as the "Custis Memorial Parkway Trail".
