= Tom's Run Relay =

Relay race in the United States

Tom's Run Relay is an annual 200-mile running and biking relay along the C & O Canal Towpath from Cumberland, Maryland, to its terminus in Georgetown, Washington, D.C. Runners continue through Washington, D.C., and cross the 14th Street Bridge to access the Mount Vernon Trail. Runners continue along the Mount Vernon Trail through Old Town Alexandria, Virginia, to the finish at Fort Hunt Park. Tom's Run Relay is the oldest overnight relay in the Washington, D.C., area. Runners start after midnight and must be accompanied at all times by a bicycle escort.

Tom's Run Relay is run in honor of U.S. Coast Guard Chief Warrant Officer 4 Tom Brooks, who was diagnosed with and later died from amyotrophic lateral sclerosis (ALS), also known as Lou Gehrig's Disease.

Turn-by-turn driving directions are available on the run's website and in 2019 a Google Map of the course was populated with the information for easier navigation.
