= Bluemont Junction Trail =

Rail trail in Virginia, US

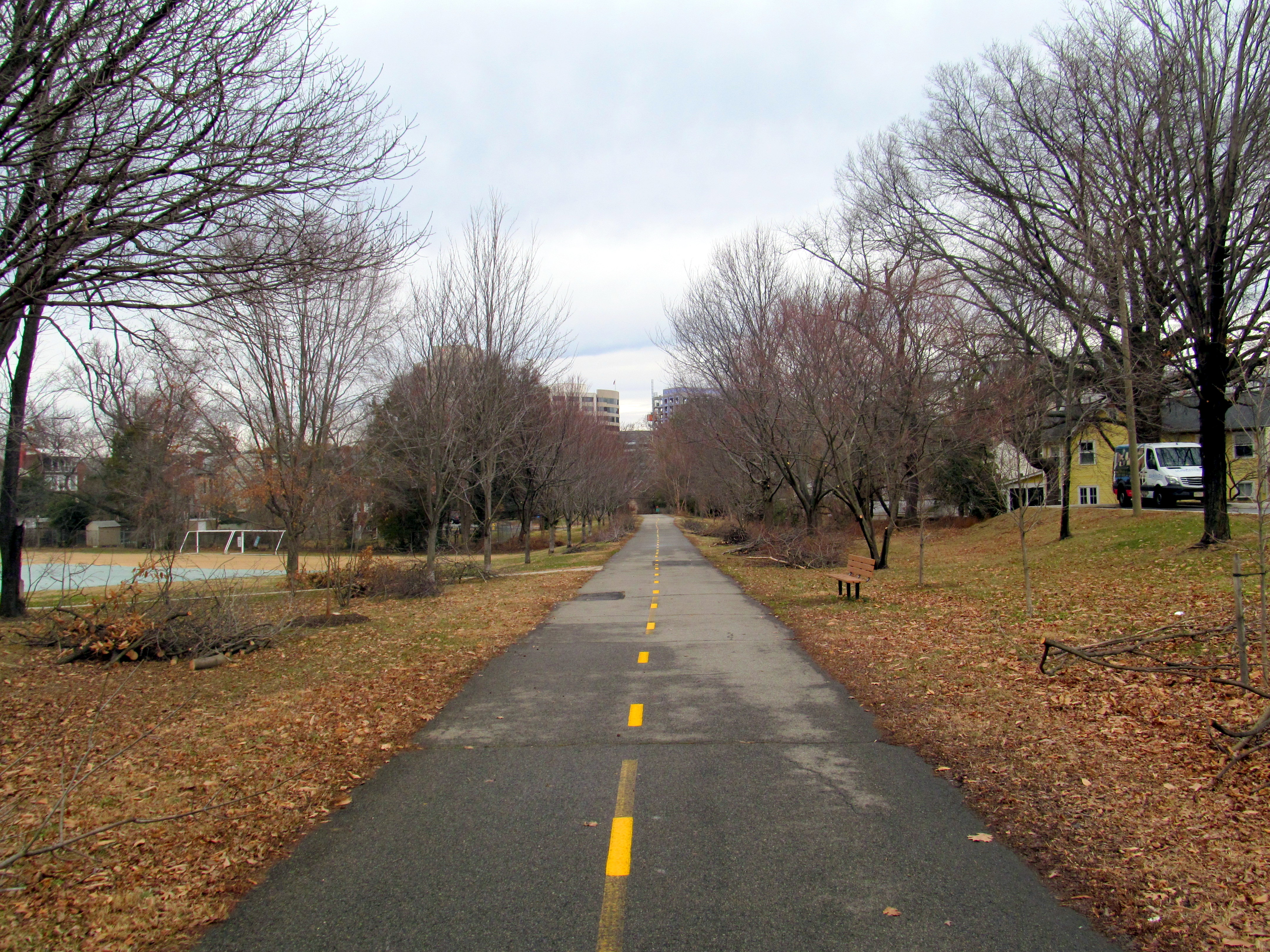
- Bluemont Junction Trail with Fields Park (to the left) and Ballston buildings in the background in January 2017
- Length: 1.3 miles
- Location: Arlington County, Virginia
- Established: 1988
- Designation: Shared use path; Rail trail
- Trailheads: Northeast: Fairfax Drive 38°52′55″N 77°07′05″W; Southwest: Bluemont Junction 38°52′19″N 77°07′56″W
- Use: Biking, running, walking
- Grade: Small; moderately steep near Bluemont Junction trailhead
- Difficulty: Mostly easy; moderate near Bluemont Junction trailhead
- Season: All
- Months: All
- Sights: Trees and shrubs in Bluemont Junction Park
- Hazards: Street crossings, especially at: N. Kensington Street 38°52′15″N 77°07′42″W; Wilson Boulevard 38°52′42″N 77°07′16″W; N. George Mason Drive 38°52′42″N 77°07′15″W
- Surface: Asphalt
- Right of way: Former railroad
- Website: www.traillink.com/trail/bluemont-junction-trail/

Trail map
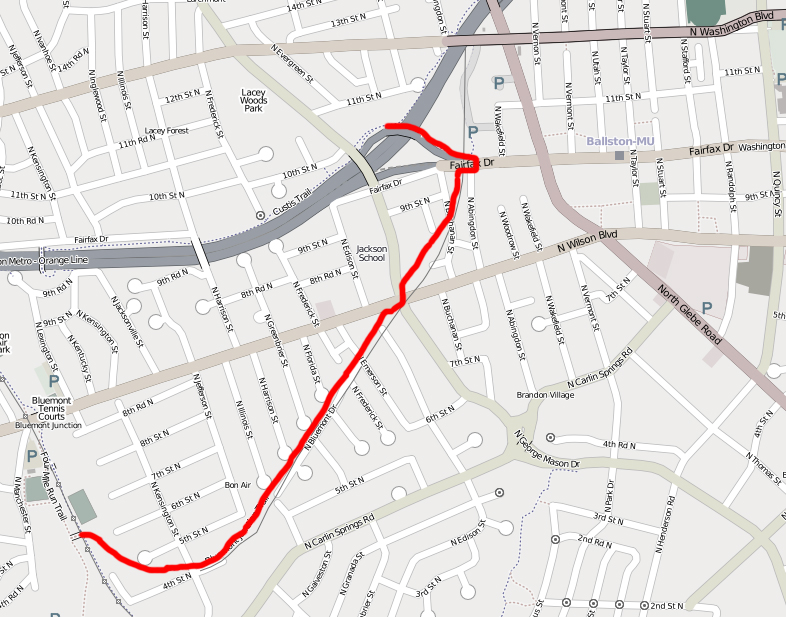

The Bluemont Junction Trail is a 1.2-mile (1.9 km) asphalt-paved rail trail in Arlington County, Virginia, United States, that the Arlington County government constructed along a former branch of the defunct Washington and Old Dominion Railroad. The shared use path travels southwest from Ballston through Bluemont Junction Park to Bluemont Junction. The trail connects Ballston to the Washington and Old Dominion Railroad Trail (W&OD Trail) and the Four Mile Run Trail in and near Bluemont Park.

The trail is part of a route to Georgetown and downtown Washington, D.C. It serves as an alternative to a portion of the more hilly Custis Trail.

== History ==
In 1911, the newly incorporated Washington and Old Dominion Railway purchased the property that now contains the Bluemont Junction Trail to accommodate a part of a planned connection between the railway's line that travelled between Alexandria and the town of Bluemont, Virginia (at the base of Blue Ridge east of Snickers Gap) and its line that travelled between Georgetown and Great Falls. The three-mile long double-track connection traveled between a site to be named "Bluemont Junction" in the valley of Four Mile Run and a site to be named "Thrifton Junction" near Lee Highway (now a part of U.S. Route 29).

The connection opened on June 30, 1912, and became a part of the railway's main passenger line. After the portion of the railway that traveled between Thrifton Junction and Great Falls closed in 1934, the former connection remained as a part of the section of the railroad that traveled between Bluemont Junction and the railroad's Rosslyn terminal.

In 1960, the Virginia highway department began negotiations to purchase the portion of the line that traveled between Rosslyn and Washington Boulevard for the construction of a highway that was to become part of Interstate 66 (I-66). The purchase was made in July 1962 for $900,000.

In September 1963, the railroad stopped operating east of Washington Boulevard. In 1964, the railroad stopped using the portion of the line that remained between Washington Boulevard and Bluemont Junction. After the highway department purchased the remainder of the railroad in 1968, the department sold to the Virginia Electric and Power Company (VEPCO) the portion of the railroad's former right-of-way that the department did not need for the construction of I-66 or for other transportation purposes.

The Arlington County government subsequently acquired the portion of the railroad's former right-of-way that now lies between I-66 and Bluemont Junction. The County unofficially opened the Bluemont Junction Trail (by then in the County's Bluemont Junction Park) between Bluemont Junction and Fairfax Drive in August 1988 and officially with a celebration on October 8, 1988.

== Description ==
The Bluemont Junction Trail's northeast trailhead is located on the south side of Fairfax Drive near the eastbound exit ramp of Interstate 66 (I-66) (the Custis Memorial Parkway) in Ballston. North of the Drive, a 300-yard-long (274 m) connector trail travels along the westbound entrance ramp of I-66, crossing the highway to meet the Custis Trail, which travels east to Rosslyn, the Francis Scott Key Bridge and the Mount Vernon Trail. Shared use paths connecting to the Custis Trail and the Mount Vernon Trail cross the Potomac River on four bridges and provide access to Georgetown, the National Mall and downtown Washington, D.C.

A northward extension of the Bluemont Junction Trail travels 388 yards (355 m) between the north side of Fairfax Drive and the south side of Washington Boulevard (Virginia State Route 237), where it connects to North Glebe Road (Virginia State Route 120). The trail meets at its northeast trailhead on-street bike lanes that travel between Ballston and Rosslyn on Fairfax Drive (Virginia State Route 237) and on Clarendon and Wilson Boulevards above the underground routes of Washington Metro's Orange and Silver lines.

After leaving the northeast trailhead, the Bluemont Junction Trail travels 1.2 miles (1.9 km) southwest in Arlington County's Bluemont Junction Park, crossing five streets at grade. The trail reaches its southwest trailhead at an intersection with the W&OD Trail at Bluemont Junction, near Four Mile Run. A bridge over the Run connects the trail to the Four Mile Run Trail in Bluemont Park.

The Bluemont Junction Trail's grade is generally small except near its southwest trailhead. The trail's elevation at its northeast trailhead at Fairfax Drive is 259 feet (78.9 m). After reaching its highest elevation (275 feet (83.8 m)) at its crossing of Wilson Boulevard, the trail descends to its southeast trailhead, where its elevation is 207 feet (63.1 m).

== Gallery ==
Views along the Bluemont Junction Trail from northeast to southwest:

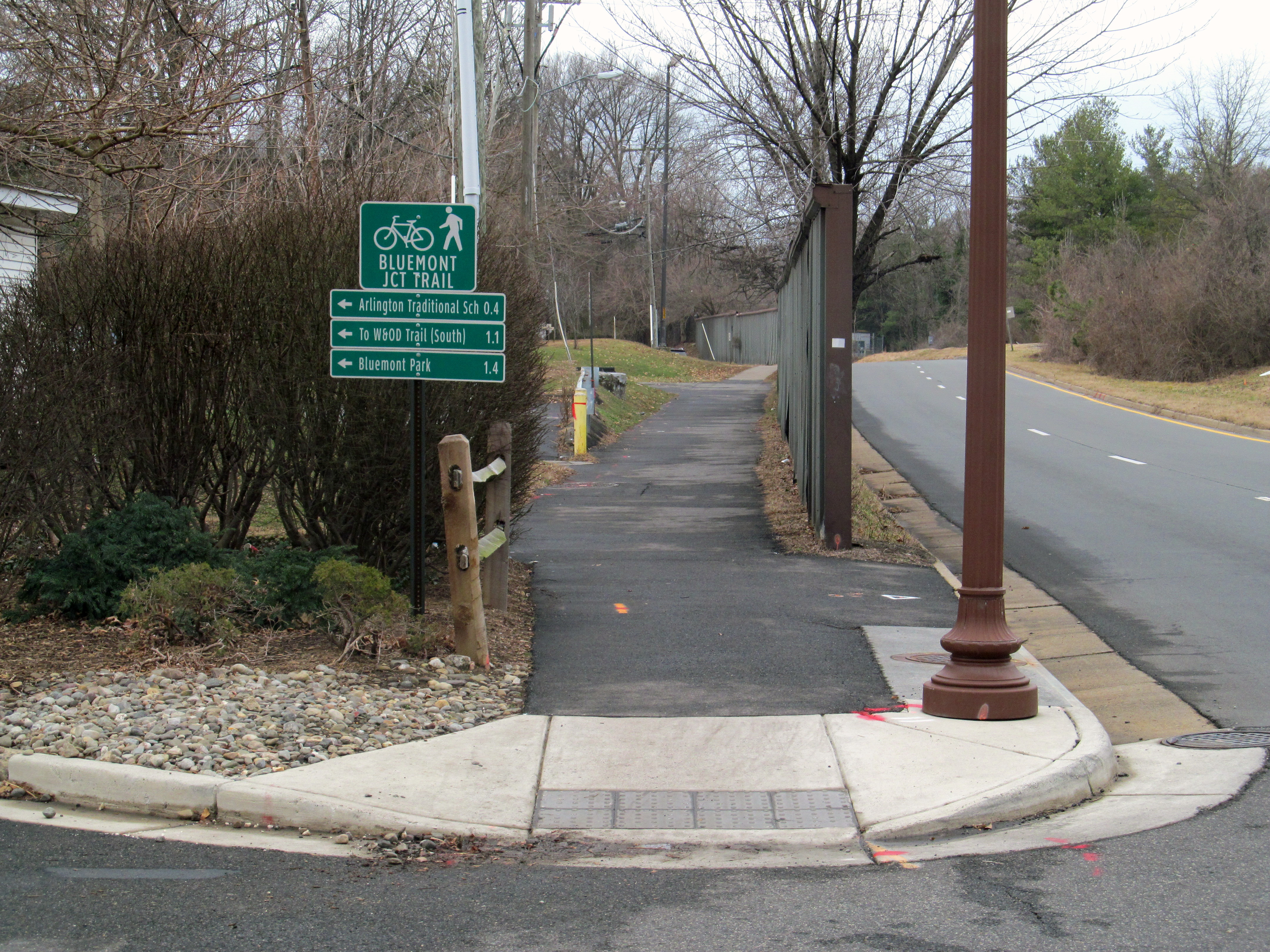
Trailhead at the I-66 exit to eastbound Fairfax Drive in Ballston, looking west (January 2017)

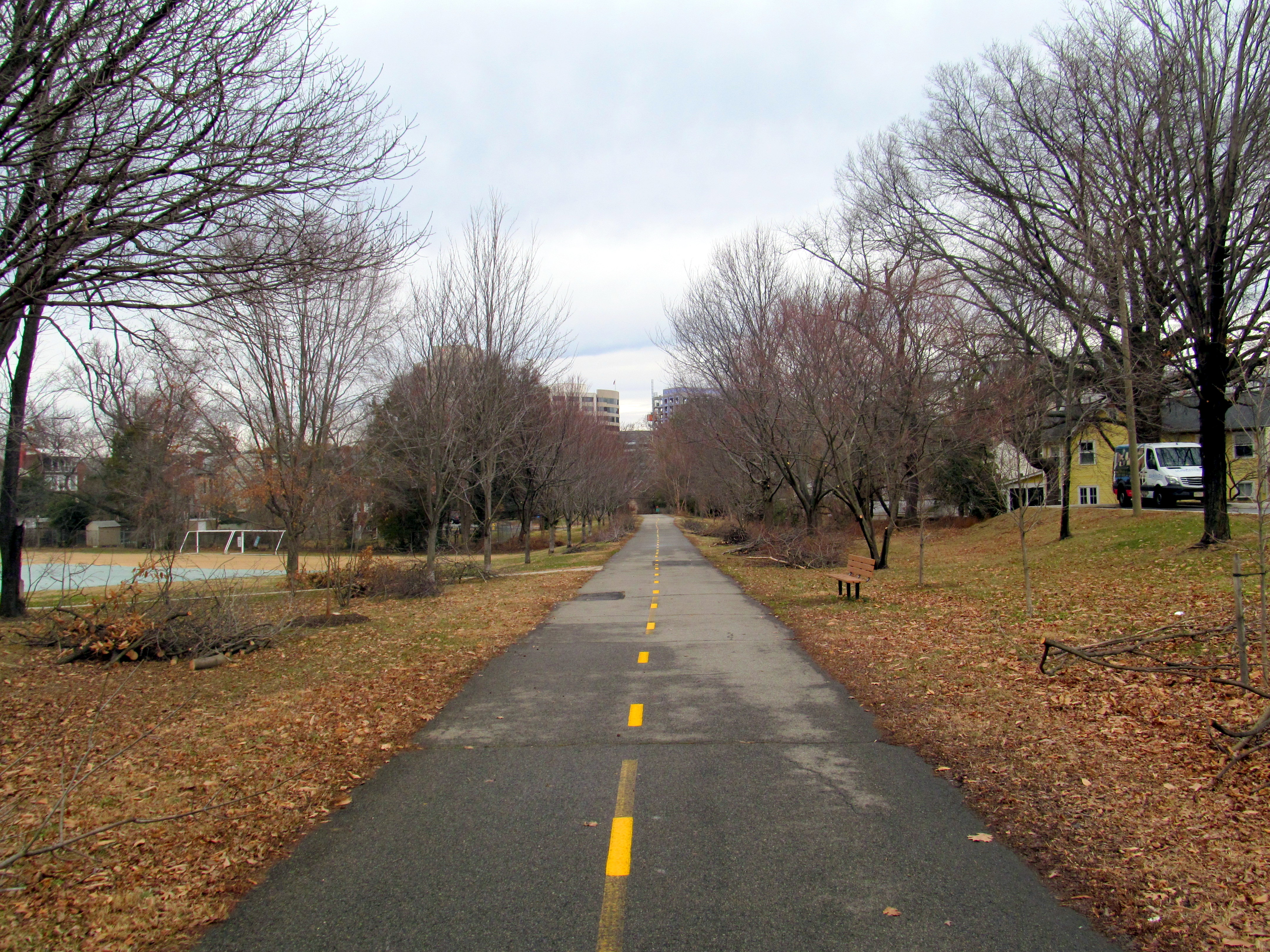
Trail passing Fields Park, looking northeast towards Ballston (January 2017)

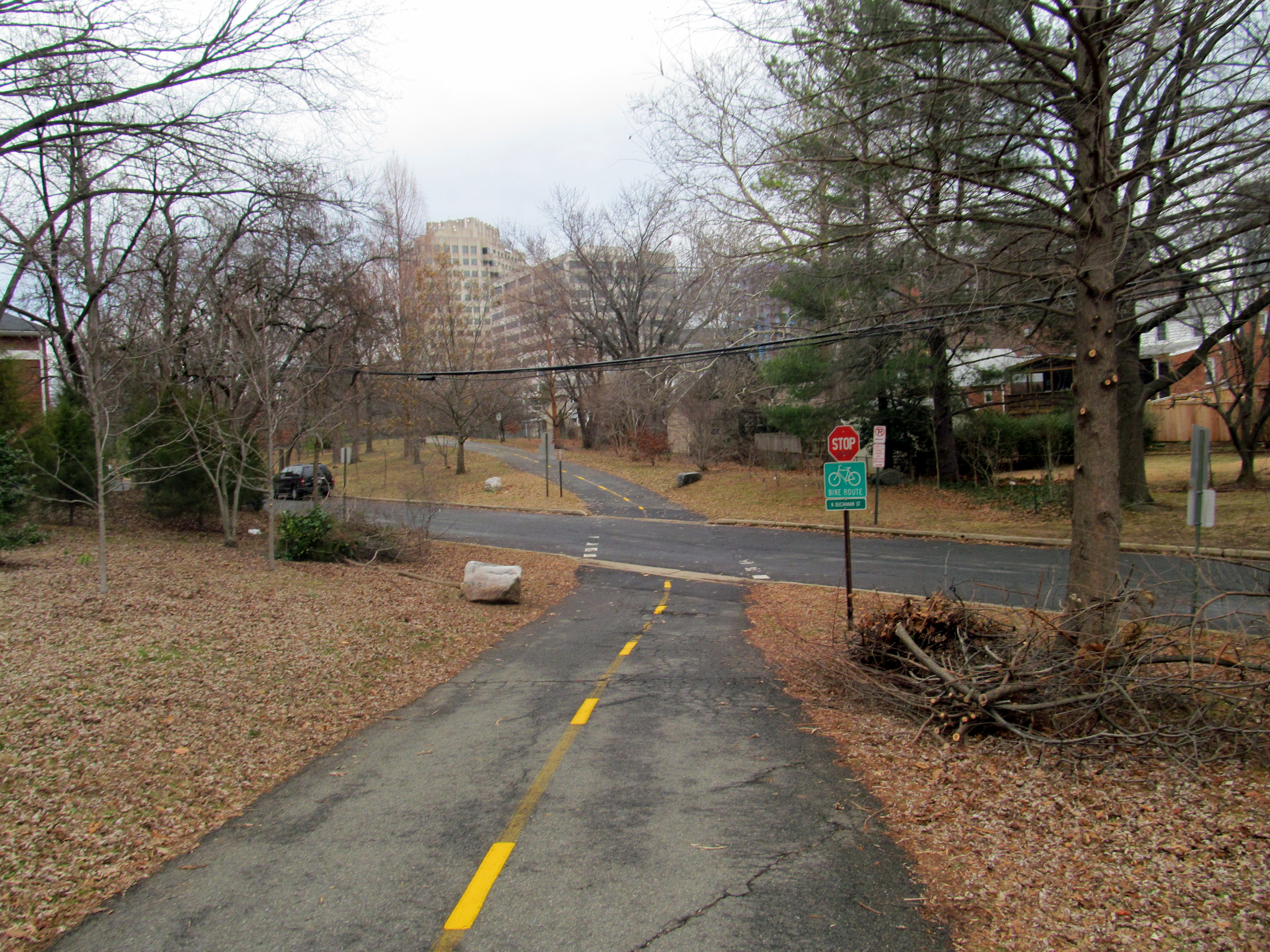
Trail crossing North Buchanan Street, looking northeast towards Ballston (January 2017)

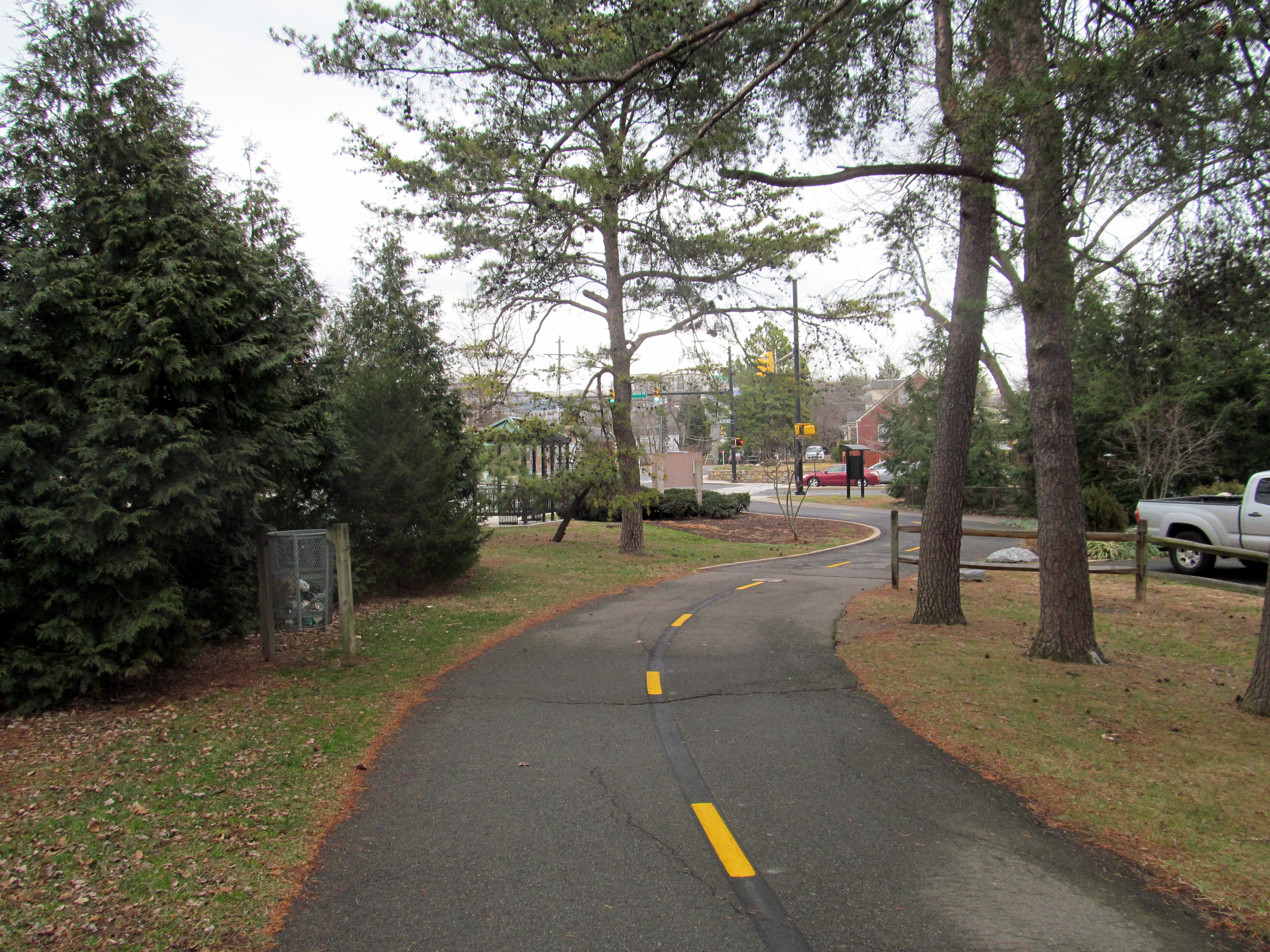
Trail south of Wilson Boulevard near North Edison Street, looking northeast towards North George Mason Drive (January 2017)

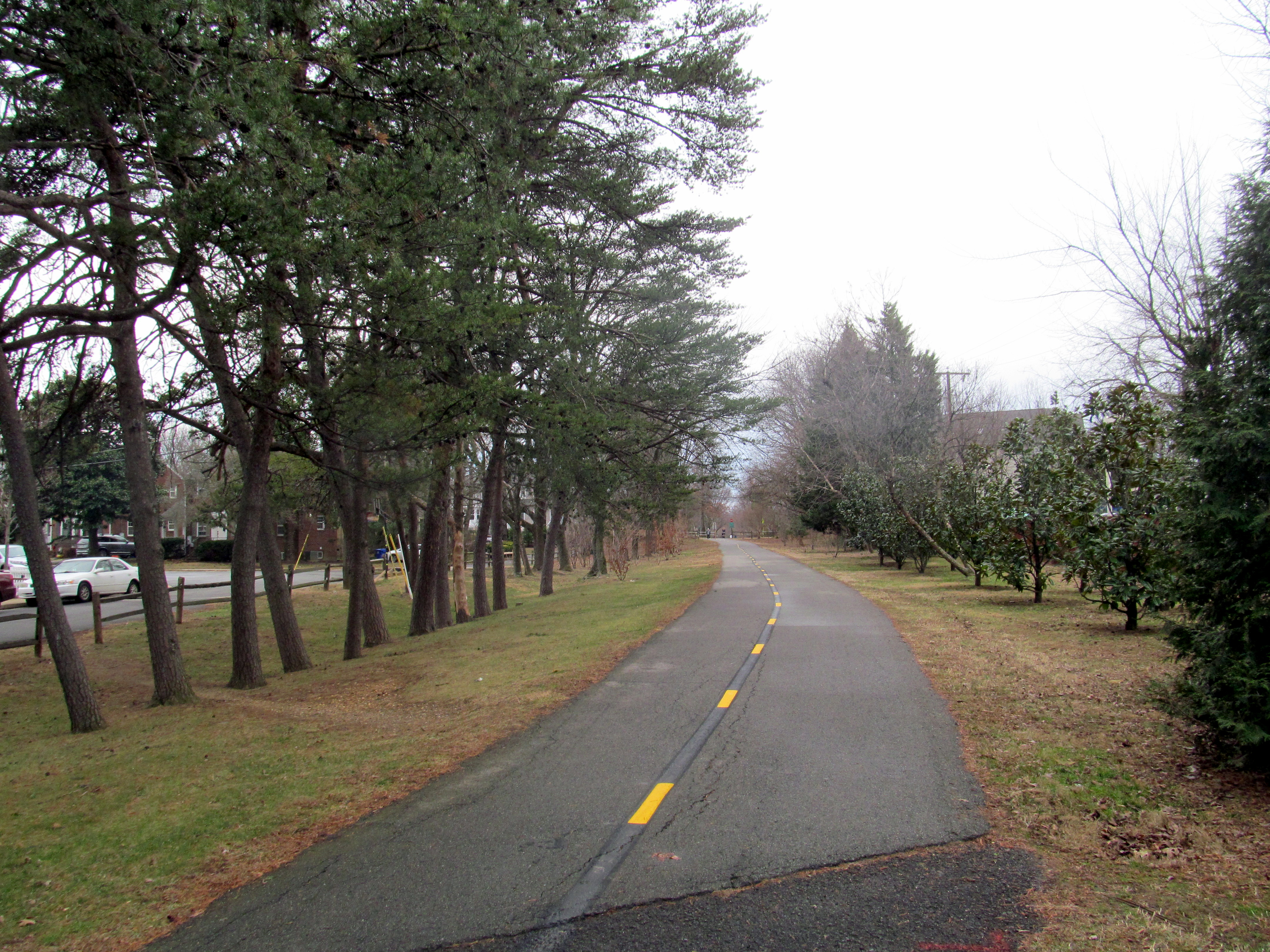
Trail south of Wilson Boulevard near North Edison Street, looking southwest (January 2017)
