= Four Mile Run =

Stream in Virginia

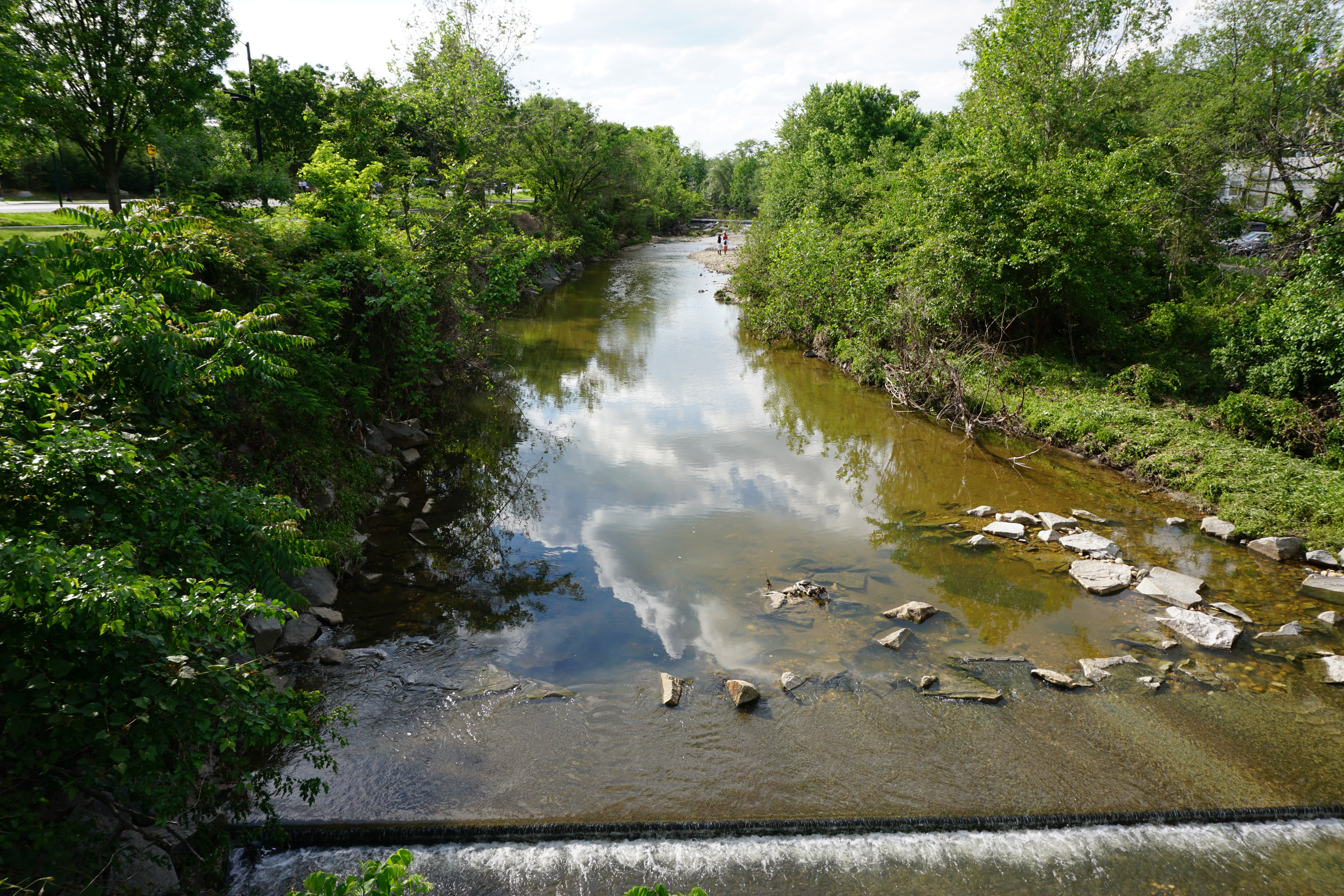
- Four Mile Run near Arlington's Jennie Dean Park

- Location of mouth Four Mile Run (the United States)

Location
- Country: United States

Physical characteristics
- Source
  - location: Fairfax County, Virginia (paved over)
  - elevation: 339 feet (103 m)
- Mouth
  - location: Potomac River in Arlington County, Virginia
- Length: 9.35 miles (15 km)
- Basin size: 19.7 square miles (51 km^{2}), 17 square miles (44 km^{2}) in the non-tidal area

Basin features
- GNIS feature ID: 1478084

Four Mile Run is a 9.4-mile-long (15.1 km) stream in Northern Virginia that starts near Interstate 66, at Gordon Avenue in Fairfax County and proceeds southeast through Falls Church to Arlington County in the U.S. state of Virginia. Most of the stretch is parkland and is paralleled by two paved non-motorized transport and recreational trails, the Washington and Old Dominion Railroad Trail and the Four Mile Run Trail.

In Arlington, the stream passes from the Piedmont through the Fall Line to the Atlantic Coastal Plain in a deep forested valley. The stream's eastern section forms the boundary of Arlington County and the City of Alexandria. The stream eventually empties into the Potomac River immediately south of Reagan National Airport.

The name Four Mile Run does not derive from its length. A 2001 documentary film alleged that the name resulted from a misreading of an old map. The documentary stated that an old flour mill near the Potomac gave the stream the name of "Flour Mill Run", but the map had faded letters. A more plausible explanation is that the mouth of Four Mile Run is approximately four miles upriver from the mouth of Hunting Creek (sometimes called Great Hunting Creek) which is formed by the confluence of Cameron Run and Hooff's Run where they join the Potomac on the southern boundary of the City of Alexandria. Four Mile Run runs into the tidal Four Mile Creek within 1 mile (2 km) of the mouth of the stream.

== Course ==
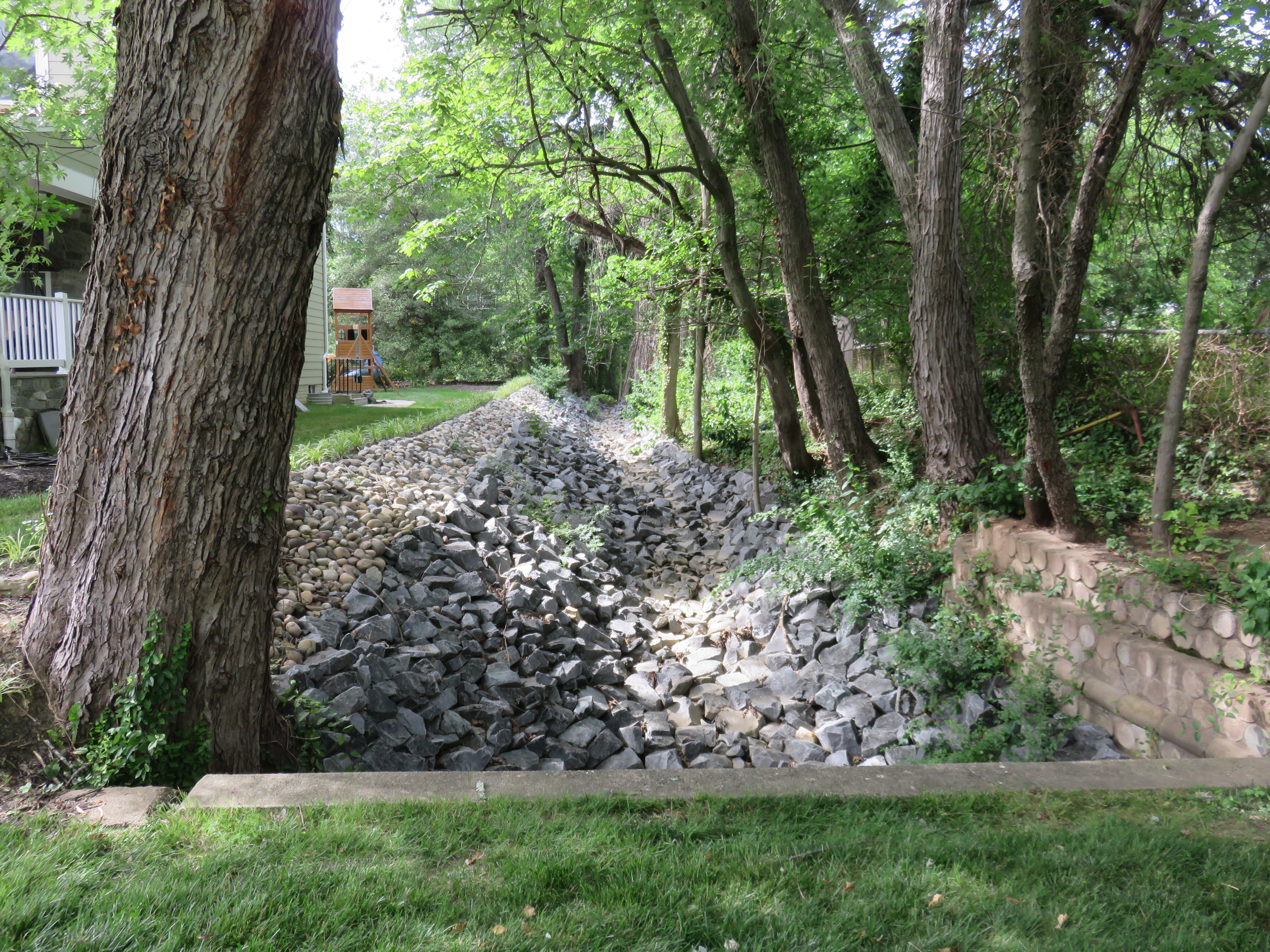
The source of Four Mile Run viewed from its first crossing at Gordon Avenue in McLean, Virginia

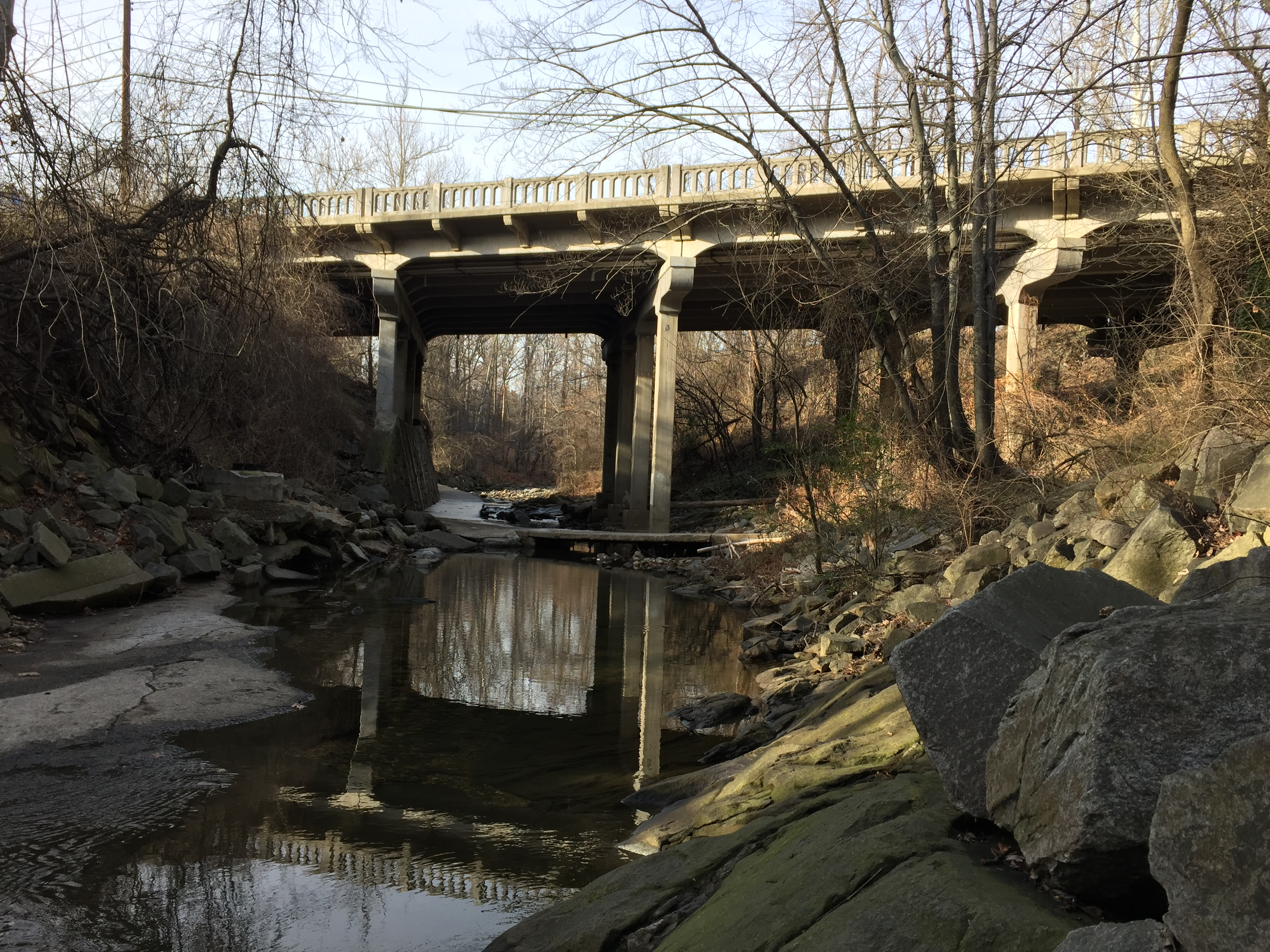
Columbia Pike crossing of Four Mile Run near the end of its section in a gorge

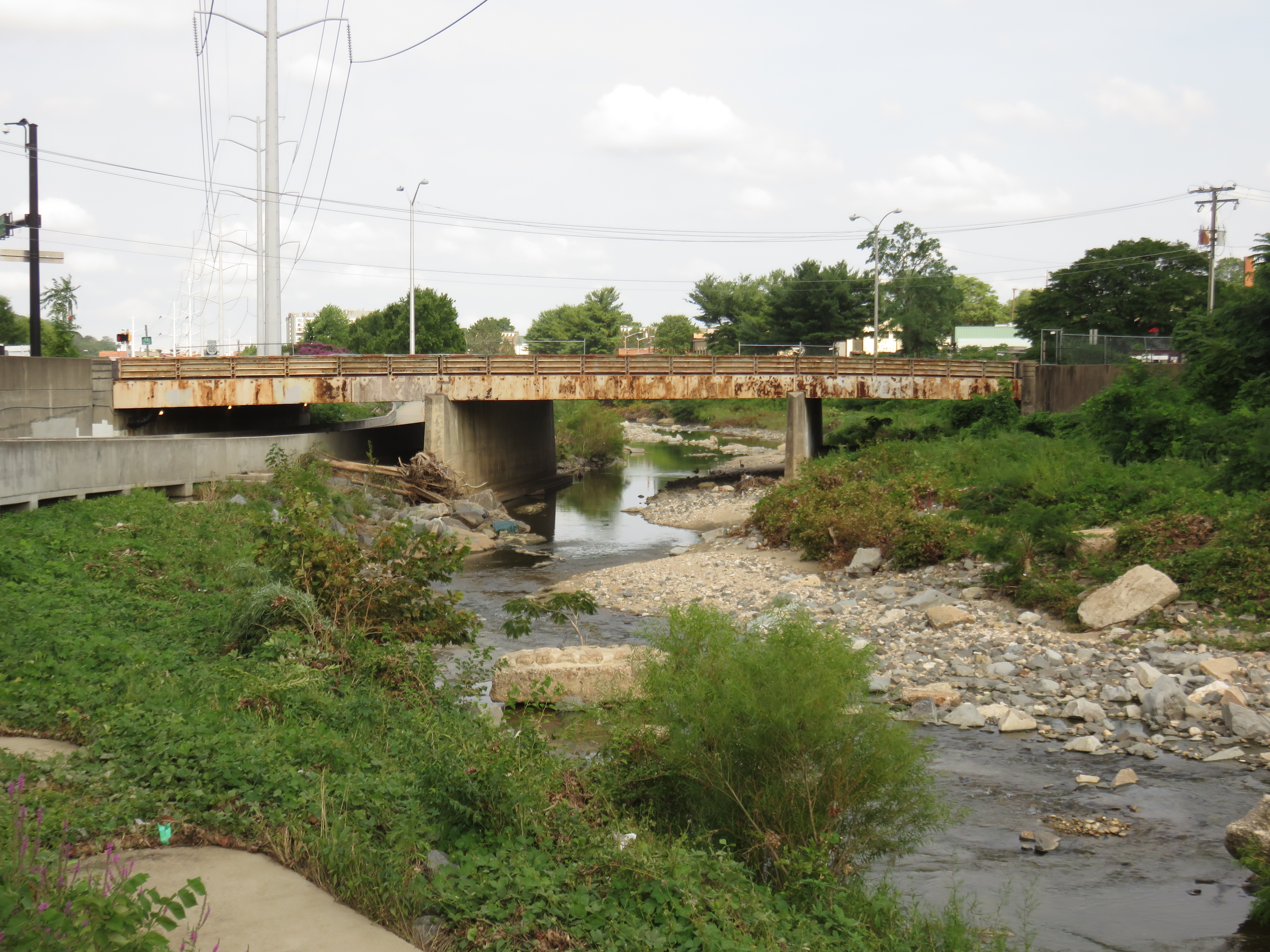
Four Mile Run crosses under West Glebe Road in its lower, channelized section

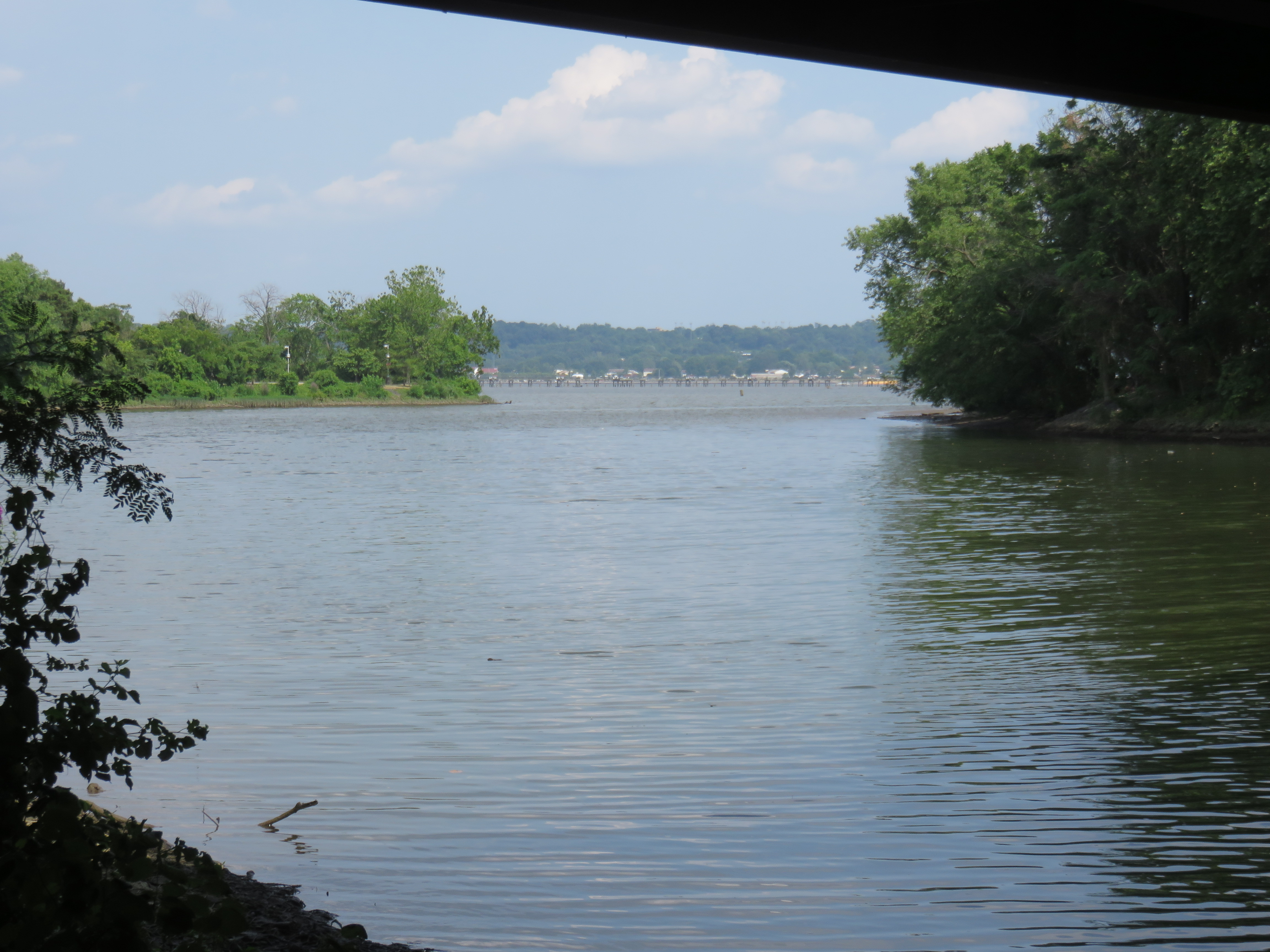
Mouth of Four Mile Run at the Potomac River

Four Mile Run begins in the vicinity of Gordon Avenue in Fairfax County. It quickly passes into Arlington County, where its uppermost course is a mix of open stream and two culverts that take it underneath Interstate 66 and a residential neighborhood in East Falls Church.

The stream briefly enters the City of Falls Church before reentering Arlington. At this point, the Washington & Old Dominion Trail begins to parallel the stream as it passes through a series of local parks: Isaac Crossman Park, Benjamin Banneker Park, East Falls Church Park, and Madison Manor Park.

At Madison Manor Park, the older Four Mile Run Trail diverges from the Washington & Old Dominion Trail; they are usually on opposite sides of the stream from this point downstream. The stream then runs immediately parallel to Interstate 66 for a time before diverging from the freeway at Bon Air Park.

South of Bon Air Park, the stream descends into a deep, narrow wooded gorge. The streamcourse is part of Bluemont Park and then Glencarlyn Park, where it crosses Arlington Boulevard (U.S. 50). The stream exits the gorge into flatter terrain just south of the Columbia Pike crossing.

The stream then flows through Barcroft Park, Shirlington Park, and then between Jennie Dean Park and the Shirlington business district. At Shirlington, the Washington & Old Dominion Trail ends as the Four Mile Run Trail continues above the stream's north bank as the waterway becomes the boundary between Arlington and Alexandria.

Downstream of Shirlington, the stream is channelized as a flood control measure, although restoration efforts are ongoing. The stream crosses under Interstate 395, and then becomes tidal in the vicinity of the Mt. Vernon Avenue crossing, whereupon its name changes to Four Mile Creek. The creek flows through Four Mile Run Park, and then underneath Richmond Highway (U.S. 1), the WMATA Yellow and Blue Lines, and the George Washington Memorial Parkway before reaching its mouth at the Potomac River at the south end of Ronald Reagan Washington National Airport.

== History ==
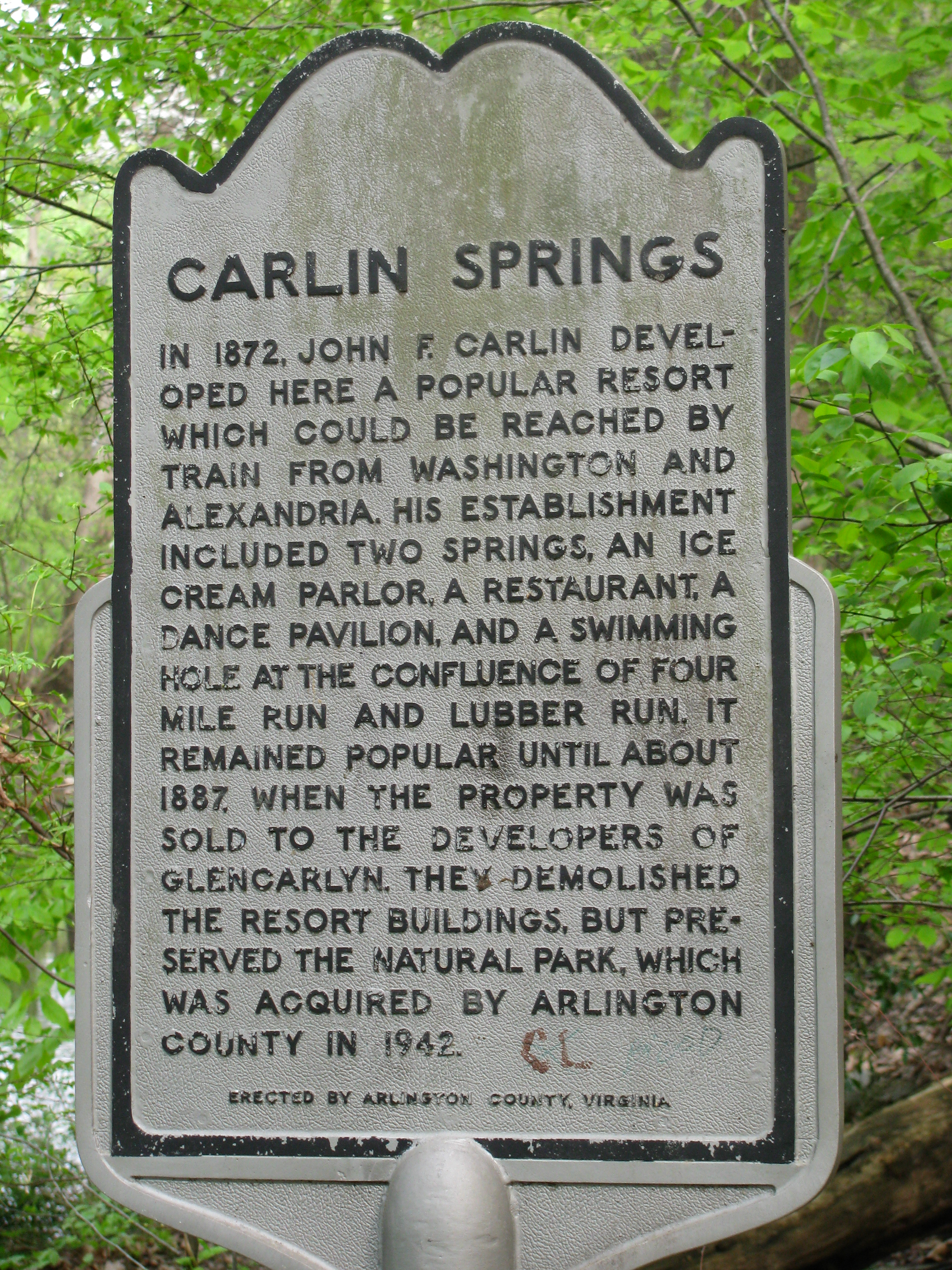
Carlin Springs historical marker

During the colonial period and the 19th century, several watermills existed in and near the fall line of the stream. Although none of these mills remain intact, the foundation of one is still in place (Arlington Mill constructed in 1836; later rebuilt as Barcroft Mill in 1880 after being destroyed by Union Army troops during the Civil War). The mill provided locals with flour ground from corn and wheat that was grown locally and shipped up the stream on flatboats. Located west of the stream between Columbia Pike and 10th Street South in Arlington, the foundation presently supports an automobile repair shop.

General George Washington owned on the southwest side of the stream in the fall line a large parcel of wooded property which he surveyed in 1785, several years after the Revolutionary War ended. As part of this survey, Washington made a cut in the trunk of an oak tree to mark a corner of his property where a tributary (Long Branch (upper)) entered the main stream. A portion of this trunk remains preserved in a neighborhood library (Glencarlyn Library), while a columnar monument marks the tree's original location.

From about 1860 to 1968, the Washington and Old Dominion Railroad and its predecessors traveled along most of the stream's length in Arlington. The Northern Virginia Regional Park Authority's Washington and Old Dominion Railroad Trail now travels along the stream on the former railroad's route. In the late 19th century, a small resort at Carlin Springs became a favorite respite for Washingtonians who would ride the train out for bathing and dancing. Carlin Springs was located within the present day Glencarlyn Park, along Four Mile Run, and surrounding Glencarlyn Neighborhood.

From 1906 to 1915, the Luna Park amusement complex operated on the banks of Four Mile Run near its confluence with the Potomac. According to publicity, it was an "architecture fashion plate," featuring ballrooms, restaurants, roller coasters, shoot-the-chutes, circus performances, and exhilarating rides. Early residents frequently cooled off in the deeper pools of Four Mile Run, even though the water must have been polluted by sewage. Not until the 1930s did the county build a centralized sewage system, with a treatment plant on the site of the old Luna Park.

In June 1972, rains from Hurricane Agnes caused the stream to overflow its banks, producing extensive flooding which was especially severe in a populated area on the coastal plain. As a result of this event, the Army Corps of Engineers channelized the stream in this and other areas, covering the stream's natural banks with riprap.

== Tributaries ==
Tributaries are listed in order from the source of Four Mile Run to its mouth.

Tributary	Side of Main Stream	Coordinates of Tributary near Confluence
Lubber Run	Northeast	38.865847°N 77.11992°W
Long Branch (upper)	Southwest	38.861845°N 77.118544°W
Doctors Run (Doctors Branch)	Northeast	38.849969°N 77.103006°W
Lucky Run	Southwest	38.845996°N 77.096751°W
Long Branch (lower)	North	38.844861°N 77.071321°W

== Parks ==
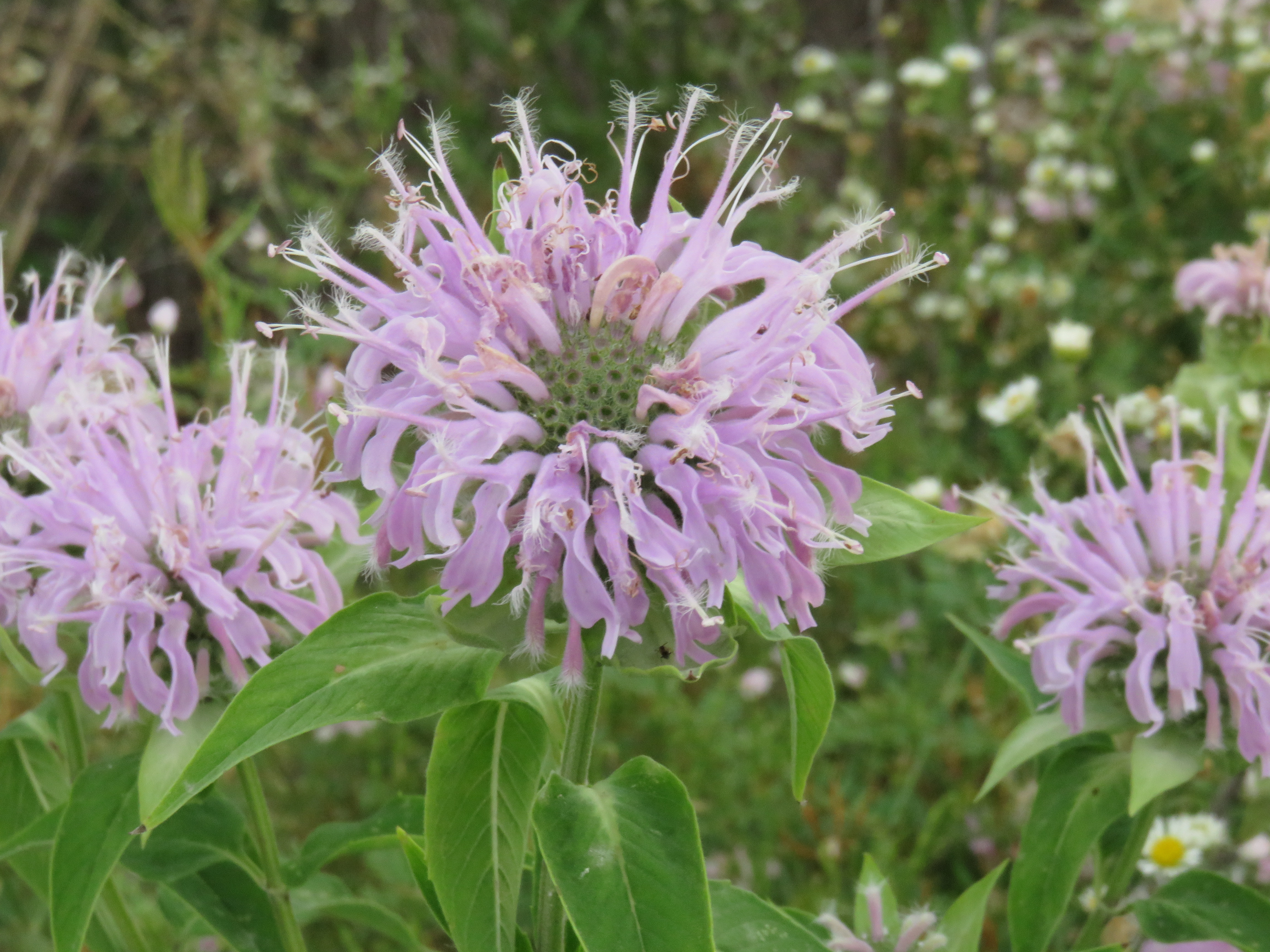
Wildflowers along the lower stretches of Four Mile Run

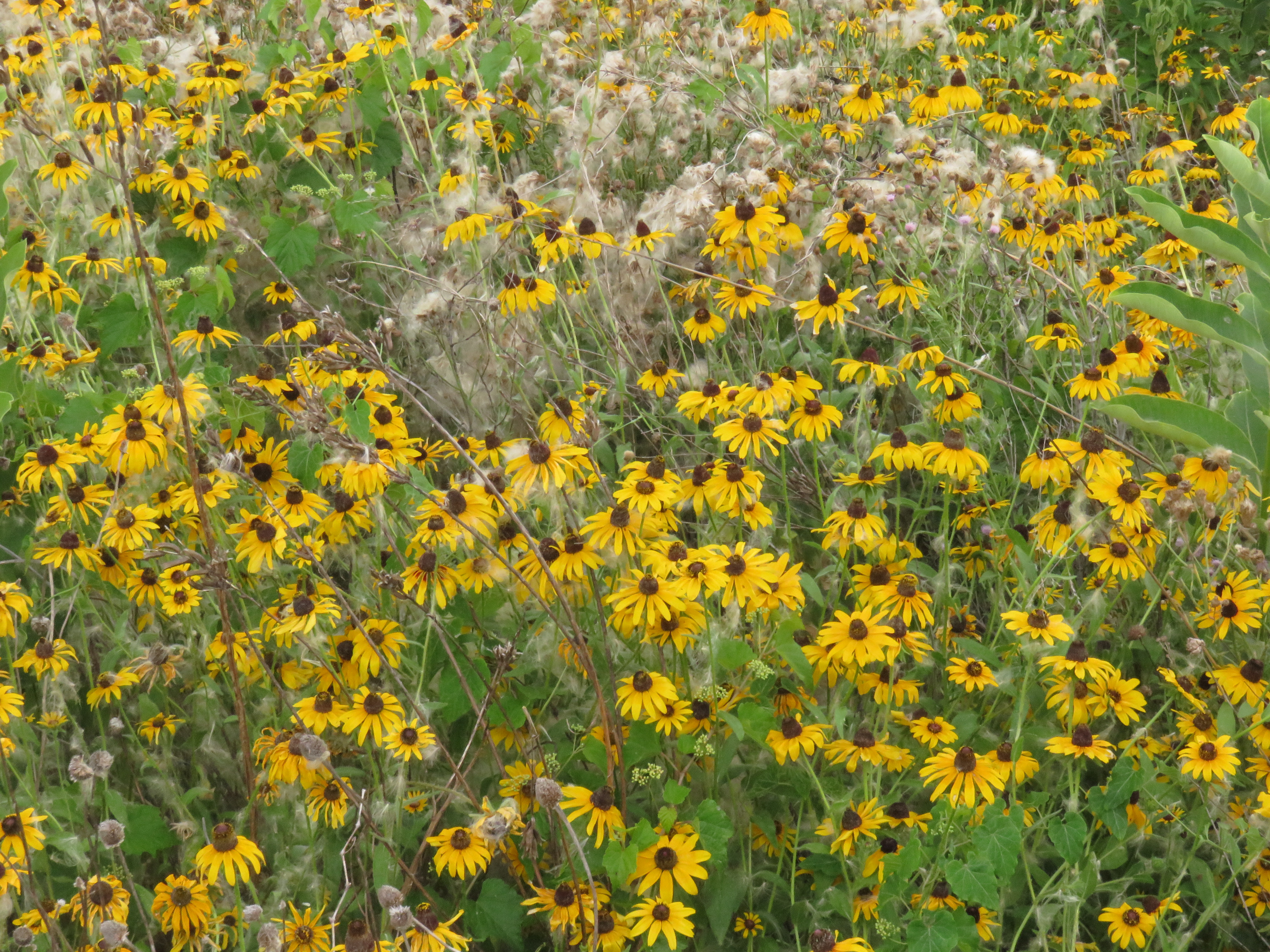
Wildflowers along the lower stretches of Four Mile Run

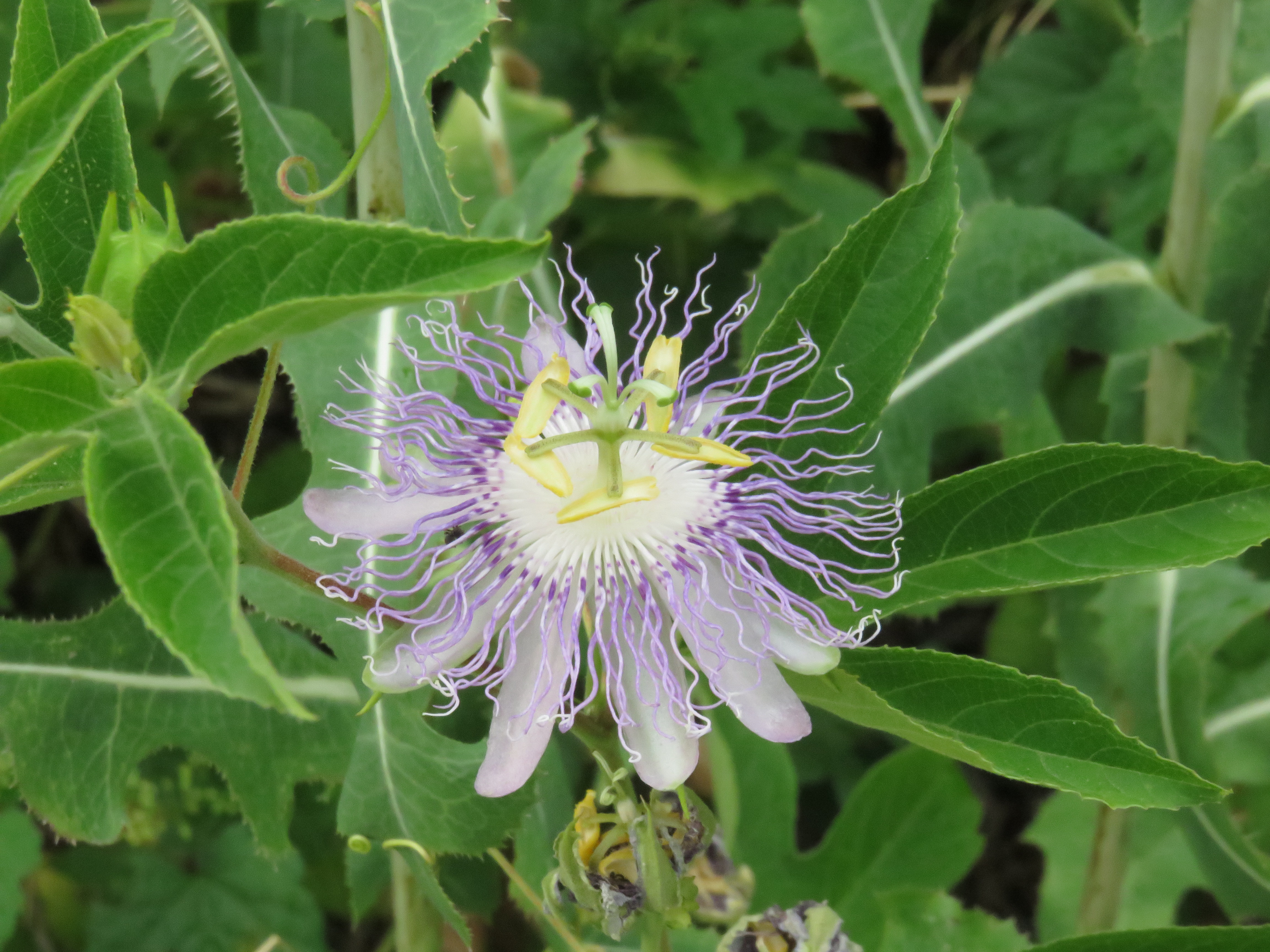
Wildflowers along the lower stretches of Four Mile Run

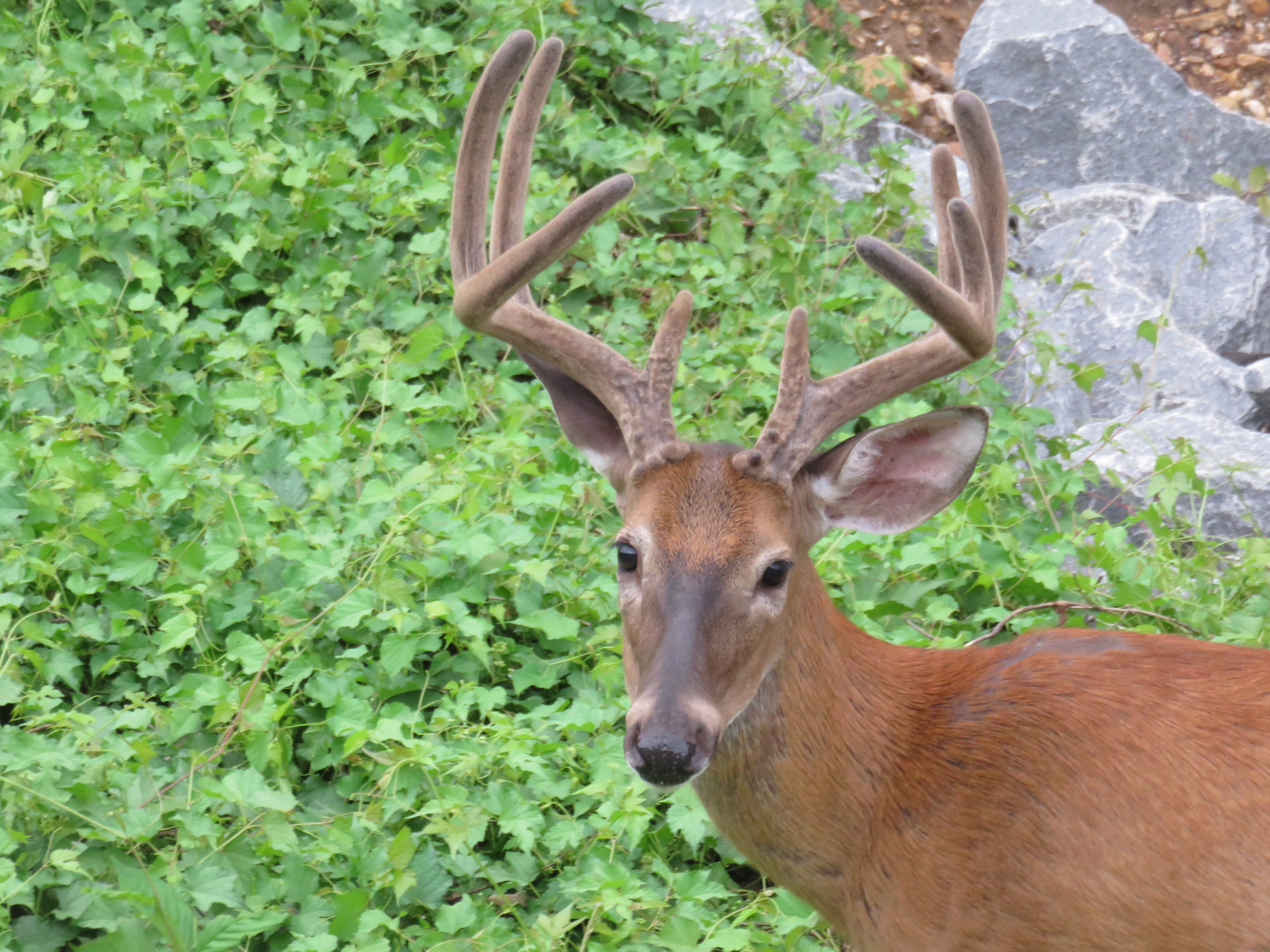
A deer of Four Mile Run

The parks through or adjacent to which Four Mile Run flows, from the source of the stream to its mouth, are:

- Washington and Old Dominion Railroad Regional Park, Arlington
- Crossman Park, Falls Church
- Benjamin Banneker Park, Arlington
- Madison Manor Park, Arlington
- Bon Air Park, Arlington
- Bluemont Junction Park, Arlington
- Bluemont Park, Arlington
- Glencarlyn Park, Arlington
- Barcroft Park, Arlington
- Shirlington Park, Arlington
- Jennie Dean Park, Arlington
- Four Mile Run Park, Alexandria
- George Washington Memorial Parkway (national park), Arlington and Alexandria

== Trails ==
The paved trails that travel near Four Mile Run are:

- Washington & Old Dominion Railroad Trail, Arlington
- Four Mile Run Trail, Arlington
- Wayne F. Anderson Bikeway, Arlington and Alexandria
- Mount Vernon Trail
- Bluemont Junction Trail, Arlington (Linear rail trail connecting Ballston and Fields Park to Bluemont Park that runs perpendicular to Four Mile Run)
- Custis Trail (along I-66), Arlington

It is possible to bicycle or hike a triangle route that passes along all three of these trails.

== See also ==
- List of rivers of Virginia
