= Custis =

Custis is a surname which may refer to:

== People related to George Washington ==
- Daniel Parke Custis (1711–1757), son of John Custis and first husband of Martha Washington
- Eleanor Parke Custis Lewis (1779–1854), step-granddaughter of George Washington
- George Washington Parke Custis (1781–1857), son of John Parke Custis and adopted son of George Washington
- Hancock Custis, a member of the Virginia House of Burgesses (1710–1712), brother of John Custis
- John Custis (1678–1749), member of the Virginia governor's Council and father of Daniel Parke Custis
- John Parke Custis (1754–1781), son of Daniel Parke Custis and stepson of George Washington
- Martha Washington (1731–1802), Martha Custis (as the widow of Daniel Custis) before she married George Washington
- Mary Anna Custis, daughter of George Washington Parke Custis and wife of General Robert E. Lee
- Mary Custis Vezey (1904–1994), poet and translator, related through her father, Henry Custis Vezey (1873–1939)
- Mary Lee Fitzhugh Custis (1788–1853), wife of George Washington Parke Custis

== Others ==
- Ace Custis (born 1974), American retired professional basketball player
- Bernie Custis (1928–2017), first black quarterback in North American football
- Donald L. Custis (1917–2021), United States Navy vice admiral
