= Mount Vernon Trail =

Shared use path in Virginia, United States

Coordinates: 38.710008°N 77.061351°W

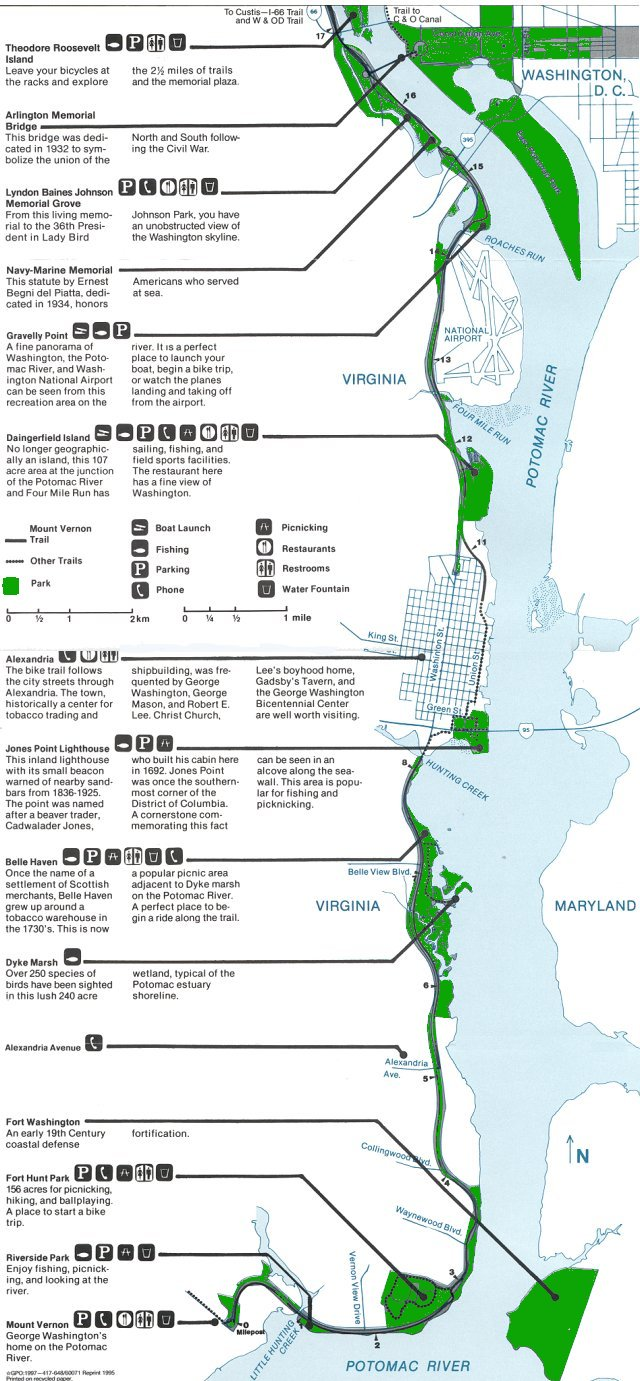
Map of the Trail

The Mount Vernon Trail (MVT) is an 18-mile (29 km) long shared use path that travels along the George Washington Memorial Parkway in Northern Virginia between Rosslyn and George Washington's home at Mount Vernon. The trail connects the easternmost portions of Arlington County, the City of Alexandria, and Fairfax County, and travels mostly on dedicated trail with a small portion on city streets. As part of U.S. Bike Route 1, the Potomac Heritage Trail and the East Coast Greenway, the MVT opened in April 1972 as a gravel path and was subsequently expanded and paved.

The MVT is part of the much larger mid-Atlantic Potomac Heritage National Scenic Trail.

== History ==
=== Completing the Original Trail ===
Separate bridle and footpaths were included in the 1890 and 1930 plans for the Mount Vernon Memorial Highway, as the George Washington Parkway was called before opening. Provisions for such paths were included in the construction of key bridges, such as the Boundary Channel Bridge on south Columbia Island and some short paths were built before 1970 in busier areas, but none of these were suitable for long bike rides.

One early path was built in 1940 between the Arlington Memorial Bridge and the Navy – Merchant Marine Memorial. That path was eventually connected to the George Mason Memorial Bridge. In 1969, that path was paved and renamed the Lady Bird Trail, in honor of Lady Bird Johnson.

Before construction of the Mount Vernon Trail, cyclists frequently rode on the parkway. On Sundays, one lane would be roped off for the exclusive use of cyclists. In fact in 1971, cyclists held a "bike-in" along the parkway. Because the route was so popular, and because the addition of concrete barriers in some places would create space, the National Park Service, after being lobbied by local civic groups led by Ellen Pickering and Barbara Lynch, decided in 1971 to build a full trail along the side of the parkway. The trail idea was not new as the Park Service had been seeking money for a trail to Gravelly Point as far back as 1967.

The Mount Vernon Trail was originally built by the Park Service in two phases. Work on the first section, a compacted gravel path from the Mason Bridge and the existing Lady Bird Trail to Slaters Lane in Alexandria, started in late 1971 and it was opened on April 15, 1972. On April 21, 1973, it was extended 7.5 miles south from I-495 to Mount Vernon with a surface of compacted fly ash from the PEPCO plant in Alexandria.

The first section was 6 feet wide and cost only $27,000 to build due to the work of numerous volunteers who, after NPS bladed the base, spent every weekend for four months spreading gravel. Because it only went to Alexandria, it was referred to as the Alexandria Bike Trail, not taking on the name Mount Vernon Trail until the second section was completed. The second section was 8 feet wide, cost $135,000 to build and received help from the U.S. Army Engineer Center at Ft. Belvoir which helped to build the timber bridges and boardwalks.

=== 20th Century Improvements ===
Since the Mount Vernon Trail opened it has been expanded, widened, connected to and improved many times. In 1976, the City of Alexandria acquired a deed from Norfolk Southern to build a section of the trail from Pendleton Street to E. Abingdon Drive. This extension moved the on-road portion through Alexandria from Pitt Street to Union Street.

In 1978, the Park Service built a new, $305,000, 1.8 mile paved section of trail on the west side of the parkway from Alexandria Avenue to Fort Hunt Road, a controversial project that was held up by legal action over safety and environmental concerns by neighbors. Previously the trail in that area had been on-road.

In 1978, the Metropolitan Washington Airports Authority built a connection from the trail to Washington National Airport's bicycle parking. In 1979, the original section between Alexandria and Memorial Bridge was paved and in 1980 the section south of Fort Hunt and the one between Alexandria and Alexandria Avenue was paved.

In 1980, as part of the construction of seven bridges across Four Mile Run, including bridges for Potomac Yard railroads, Route 1 and the George Washington Parkway, the Army Corps of Engineers built an extension of the Four Mile Run Trail that connected the trail to the Mount Vernon Trail. In 1982, Alexandria built a small section of trail in the area under and near the Woodrow Wilson Bridge.

In 1982-83, a new trail route was built around the east side of the Potomac River Generating Station, on a cantilevered section between the river and the power plant, with costs paid for by the power utility because they were facing legal action for illegally storing coal on federal land. On December 7, 1988, the Park Service expanded the trail north from Arlington Memorial Bridge to Roosevelt Island where a new bridge over the parkway, which opened on June 11 of that year, connected it to the Custis Trail. Later that same year a new trail segment was built in Fort Hunt Park where the trail had been on road. That represented the last new section of trail.

However, many sections of trail have been improved, and several new connections to the trail have been built. In March 1992, work began on the Crystal City Connector Trail that connected the trail to Crystal City via a pedestrian tunnel that had been built when the railway was moved nearly a decade beforehand. The Connector opened on August 22, 1992. Between 1994 and 1999, Arlington County built a trail connection between the Mount Vernon Trail at Memorial Circle and the sidewalk along Washington Boulevard that would eventually become the Washington Boulevard Trail.

=== 21st Century Improvements ===
In 2000, the Metropolitan Washington Airports Authority opened two new bike bridges - one over the ramp from the GW Parkway to the West Entrance Road and the other over the exit from Smith Avenue to the Parkway - and a repaired section of trail across the airport grounds. The two bridges cost more than a million dollars, took a year to build and opened in early February 2000.

In 2003, the Wilkes Street Tunnel Trail, which was constructed between 1980 and 1999 was connected to the on-street portion of the trail at Union Street.

In 2006, after it was determined that the bridge over the north entrance to National Airport was deteriorating and that the Mount Vernon Trail was a safety concern because of its close proximity to the roadway, the bridge was rebuilt and the trail was realigned and widened in the area. That section opened in 2007.

In June 2009, the trail on the new Woodrow Wilson Bridge opened with a connection to the Mount Vernon Trail and in July 2012, the trail beneath the bridge and approaching it was rebuilt. In 2011, the National Park Service rebuilt the Humpback Bridge, which involved changes to the roadway, widening the Mount Vernon Trail, adding a barrier to separate the trail users from the traffic, lowering the grade across the bridge to improve sight distance, and adding a pair of trail tunnels under the bridge for safer passage between the Columbia Island Marina, the Mount Vernon Trail and, in the future, Boundary Channel Drive. The trail lane opened on March 18.

In 2012, the Park Service realigned the trail at Memorial Circle, moving the crossing of Washington Boulevard a few hundred feet south and creating a crossing at a right angle to the road. In June 2016, the section of the trail next to the airport was realigned, widened and separated from the parkway. On May 24, 2017, the National Park Service opened a rebuilt Roosevelt Island parking lot that created a new route, with smoother curves for the Mount Vernon Trail, and the trail was also widened.

In 2022, Arlington County and the FHWA started work on the Boundary Channel Interchange Project. As part of that project, the stub trail from the Mt. Vernon Trail under the 2011 Humpback Bridge was completed to Boundary Channel Drive. The trail was opened with a ribbon cutting on May 30th, 2024.

In 2023-24, NPS rebuilt bridges #23 and #24 within Dyke Marsh Wildlife Preserve and near Belle Haven Park. They widened the bridges from 10 feet to 14 feet, added new pedestrian safe handrails and rehabilitated a bench and overlook on bridge #23.

In 2025, Alexandria upgraded a 4.5 foot wide sidewalk along Abington Road, that had served as part of the trail for decades, into a 10 foot wide trail. Work began in August and was completed in October.

The National Park Service has considered expanding the trail. In 2002, they performed a feasibility study on expanding it north to the American Legion Bridge. The design proposed was a mostly on-street route, with a pair of trail segments west of Glebe Road.

== Description ==
The trail parallels the George Washington Memorial Parkway and the western bank of the Potomac River. Most of the northern half of the trail is open with views of the river and of Washington, D.C. The southern 8 miles (13 km) below Alexandria is largely wooded with limited river views.

From its northern trailhead at a parking lot in Arlington County near Mile 17 and Theodore Roosevelt Island, the MVT travels south near the Potomac River until it turns inland to pass between the parkway and the west side of Ronald Reagan Washington National Airport. Before reaching the airport, the trail passes through Gravelly Point, where there are often views of arriving and departing airplanes. A connecting trail travels through the airport and provides access to the Ronald Reagan Washington National Airport Metro Station and the Abingdon Plantation historic site.

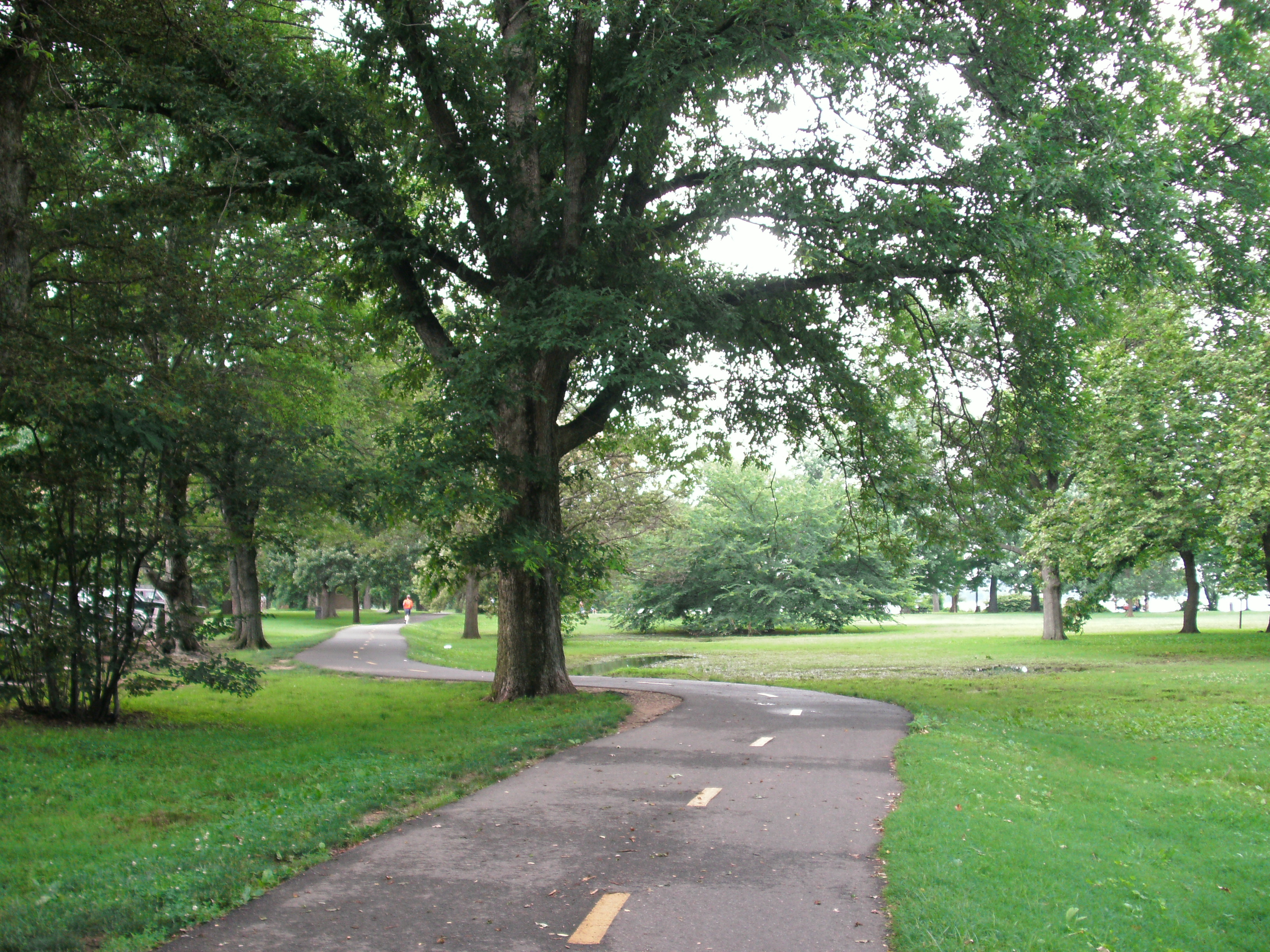
The Mount Vernon Trail at Belle Haven

After passing the airport, the trail crosses Four Mile Run and continues south between the river and the parkway. After reaching Old Town Alexandria the trail's route continues on Union Street. At the southern end of Union Street, the trail becomes an off-street path that travels southward and westward, crossing under the Woodrow Wilson Bridge and passing exhibits and restrooms near Jones Point near Alexandria's south side.

After crossing over Hunting Creek and leaving Alexandria, the trail continues south through Fairfax County along the river, passing through the west sides of Belle Haven Park and Dyke Marsh and, after travelling inland, the east side of Fort Hunt Park. The trail then continues along the river until reaching in its last mile a curving inland uphill climb that ends at Mount Vernon.

== Connecting trails ==
The Mount Vernon Trail connects to other area hiker/biker routes including:

- East Coast Greenway - a 3,000 mile long system of trails connecting Maine to Florida.
- Woodrow Wilson Bridge Trail, which crosses the Potomac River and provides access to National Harbor in Prince George's County, Maryland.
- Four Mile Run Trail, a 7 miles (11 km) paved trail that begins near the boundary between Arlington County and the City of Falls Church and travels east to meet the Mount Vernon Trail south of Ronald Reagan Washington National Airport.
- Washington & Old Dominion Railroad Trail, a 44.8 miles (72.1 km) paved rail trail that travels northwest from the Arlington County/Alexandria boundary to Purcellville, Virginia (accessed from the Four Mile Run Trail).
- Rock Creek Park Trail, a paved trail that travels north through Washington, D.C., and Montgomery County, Maryland and ends near Lake Needwood (accessed from the Arlington Memorial Bridge).
- Chesapeake and Ohio Canal towpath, an unpaved path that travels northwest from Georgetown in Washington, D.C., for 184.4 miles (296.8 km) to Cumberland, Maryland (accessed from the Francis Scott Key Bridge).
- Capital Crescent Trail, a paved rail trail that travels 7.04-mile (11.33 km) south and east from Bethesda, Maryland to Georgetown (accessed from the Francis Scott Key Bridge).
- Custis Trail, a 4 miles (6 km) paved trail that begins in Rosslyn at the end of the Mount Vernon Trail, travels west alongside I-66 and connects to the Washington & Old Dominion Railroad Trail.
- Northern Extension (Potomac Heritage Trail), a 10-mile (16 km) unpaved hiking trail beginning at the end of the Mount Vernon Trail northwest of Theodore Roosevelt Island and traveling northwest through Arlington and Fairfax Counties in and near the Potomac River gorge and near the George Washington Memorial Parkway. The trail travels near the shoreline of the Potomac River, crosses under the Francis Scott Key Bridge and passes Chain Bridge. The trail then travels inland along Pimmit Run, passes Fort Marcy Park, returns to the Potomac's shoreline and passes Turkey Run Park. The trail ends after passing beneath the American Legion Memorial Bridge, which carries the Capital Beltway (Interstate 495) over the Potomac River.

== Gallery ==
Scenes along the Mount Vernon Trail, from south to north:

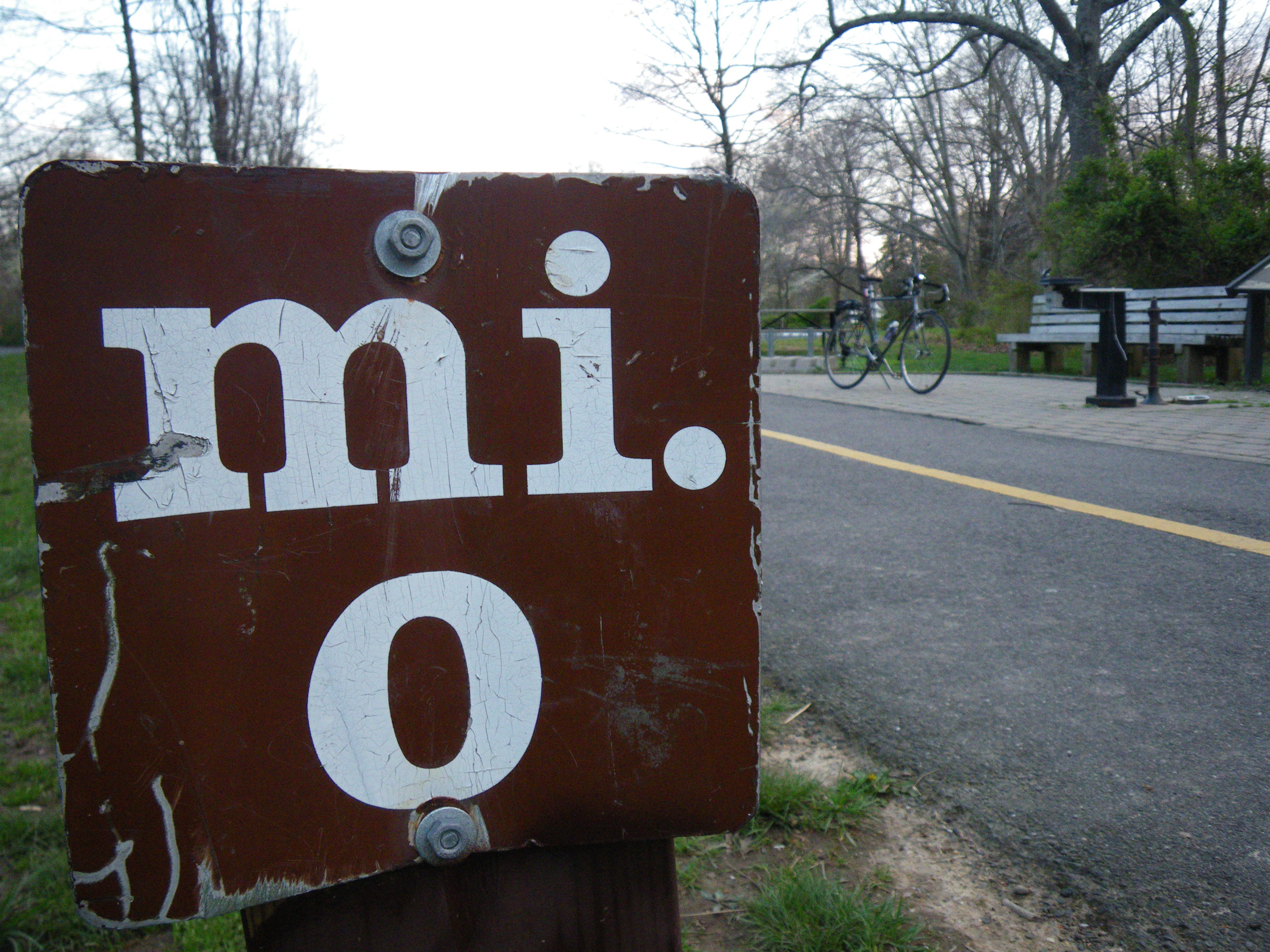
Beginning of the trail at Mount Vernon

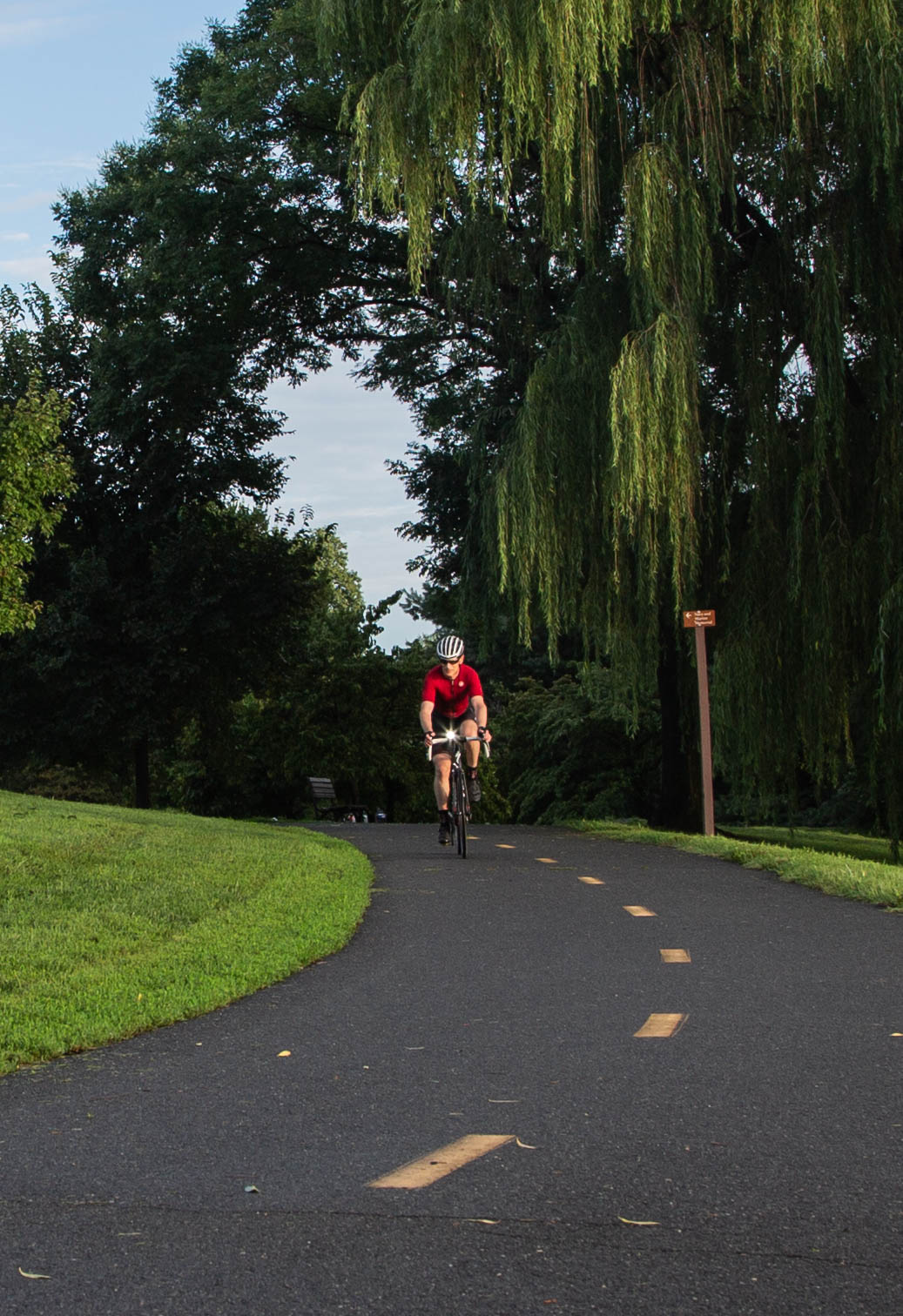
Between the Mount Vernon Estate and Fort Hunt, west of Vernon View Drive

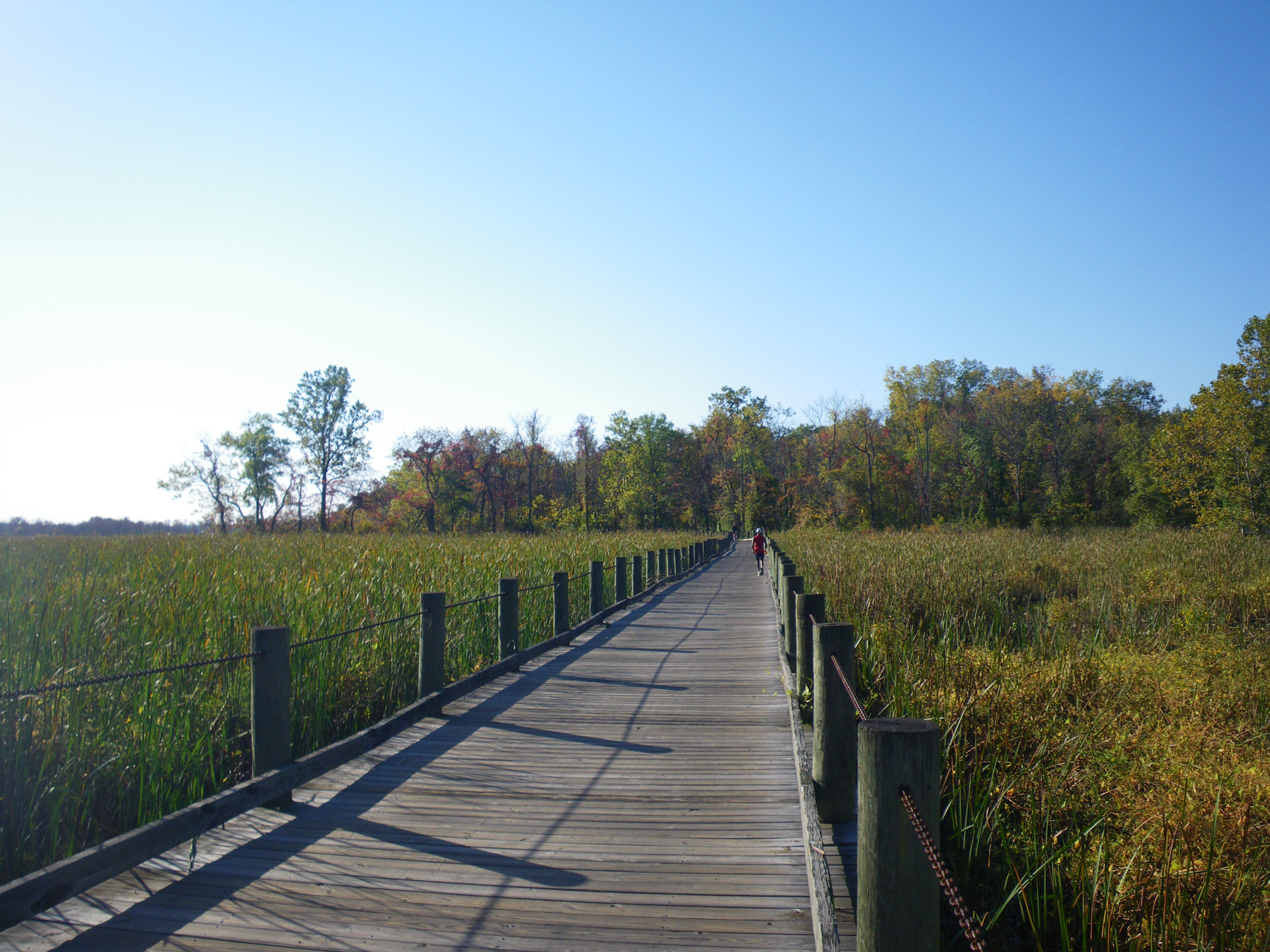
Boardwalk passing through Dyke Marsh

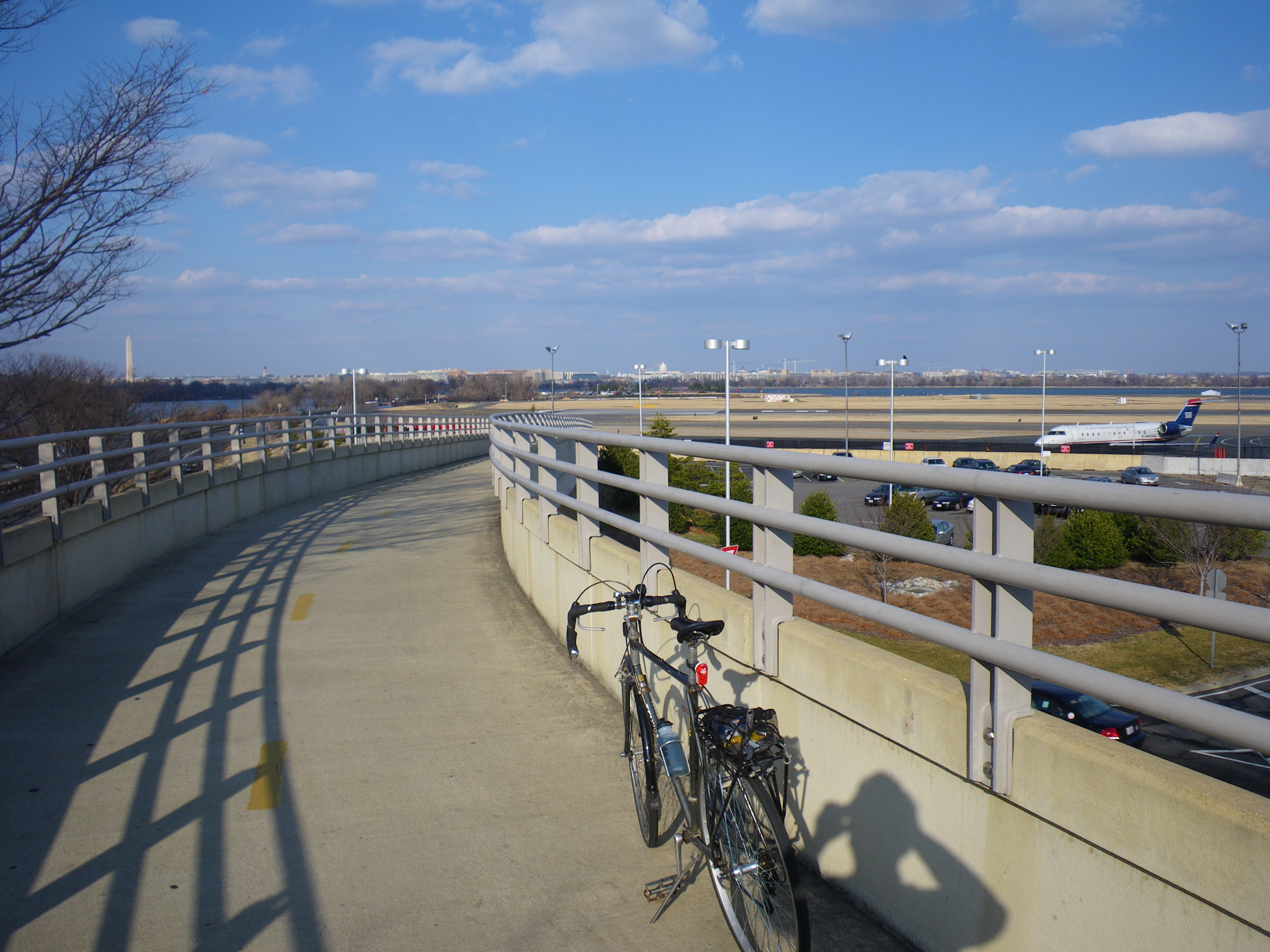
Bridge over airport traffic at Ronald Reagan Washington National Airport

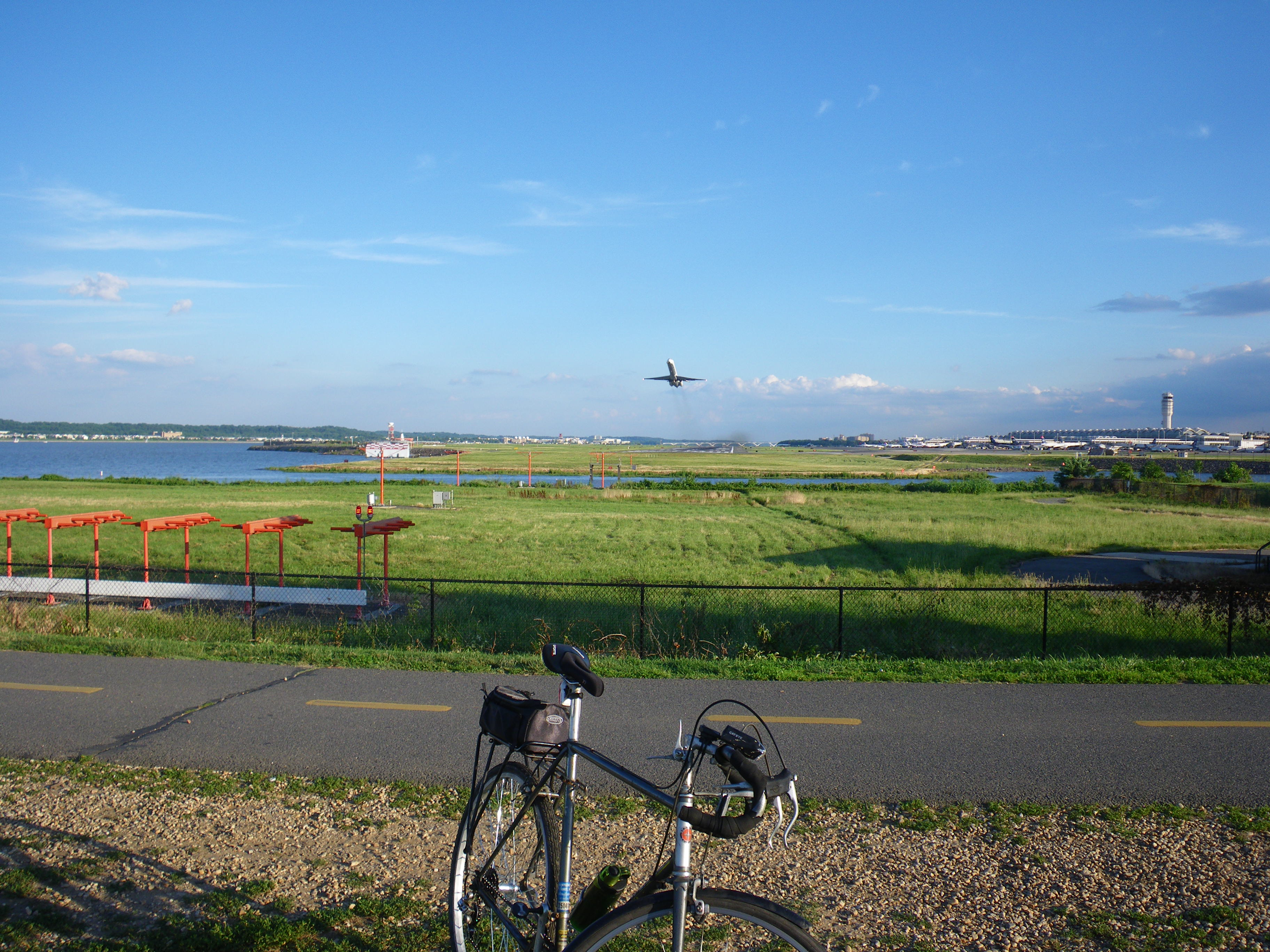
Watching airplanes take off from Gravelly Point

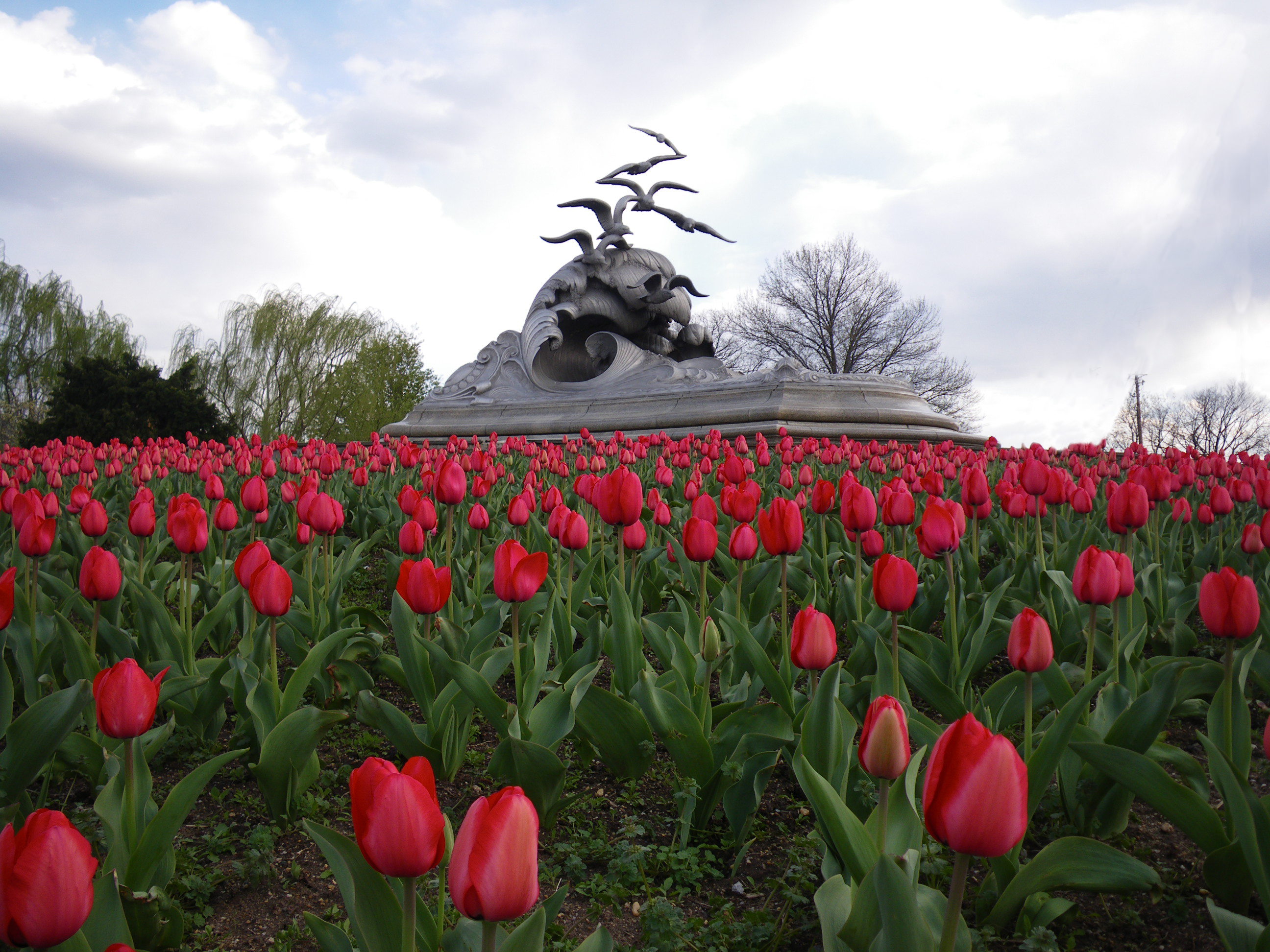
Tulips in bloom in front of the Navy-Merchant Marine Memorial

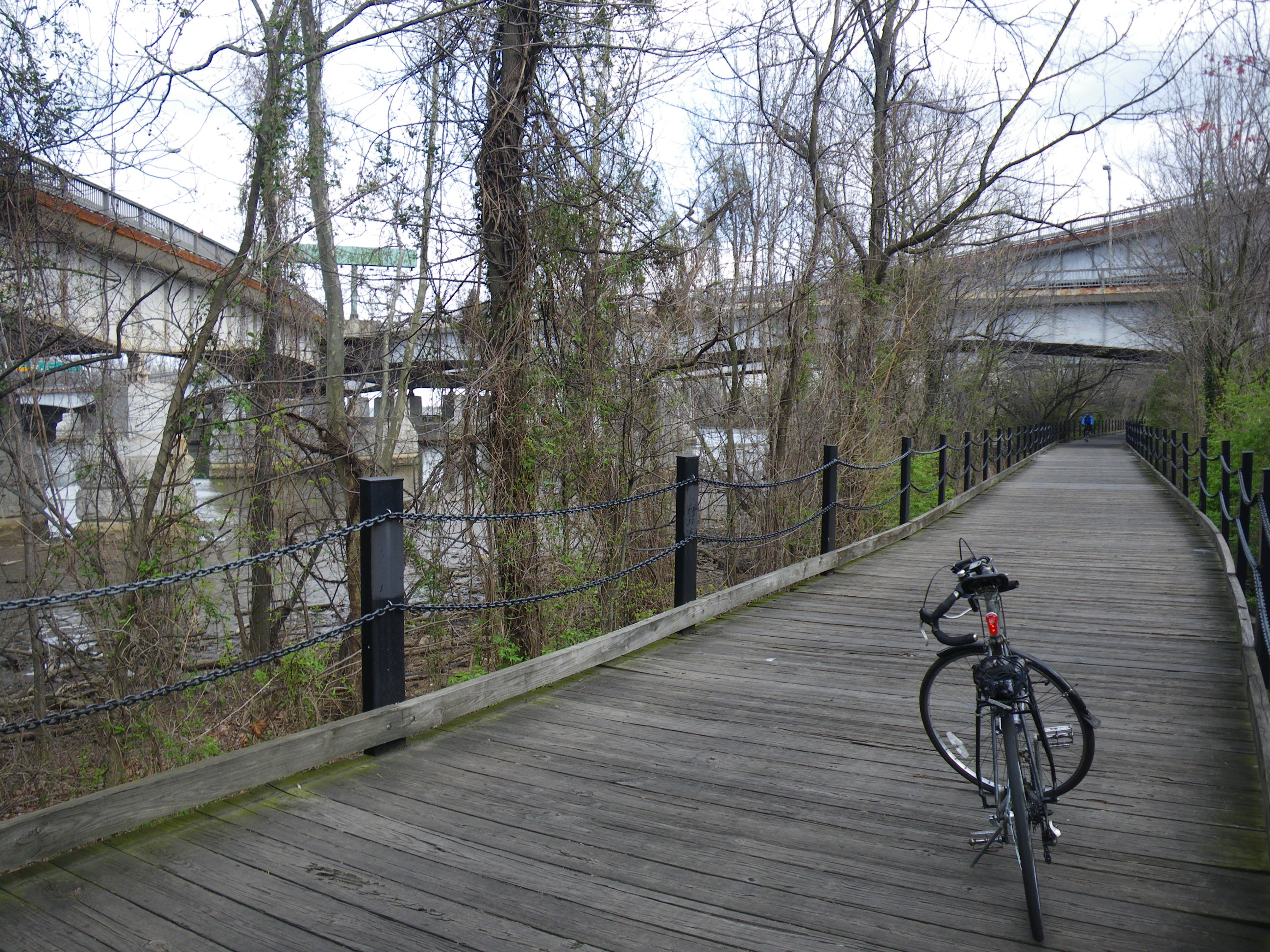
Standing in front of Theodore Roosevelt Bridge
