= Four Mile Run Trail =

Recreational trail in Virginia, US

Coordinates: 38°50′42″N 77°05′43″W

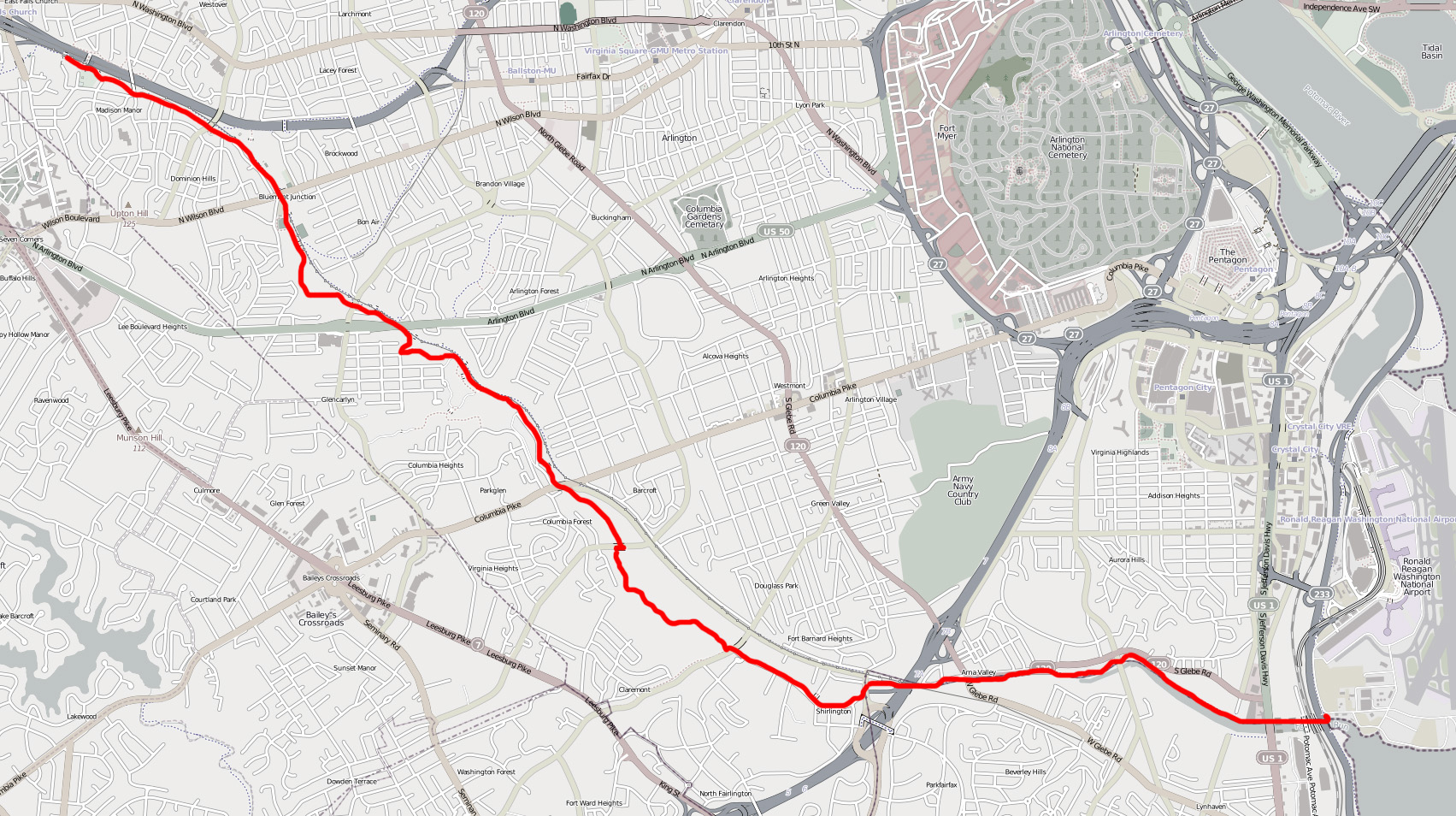
Map of the trail (omitting its northwesternmost 0.5 miles)

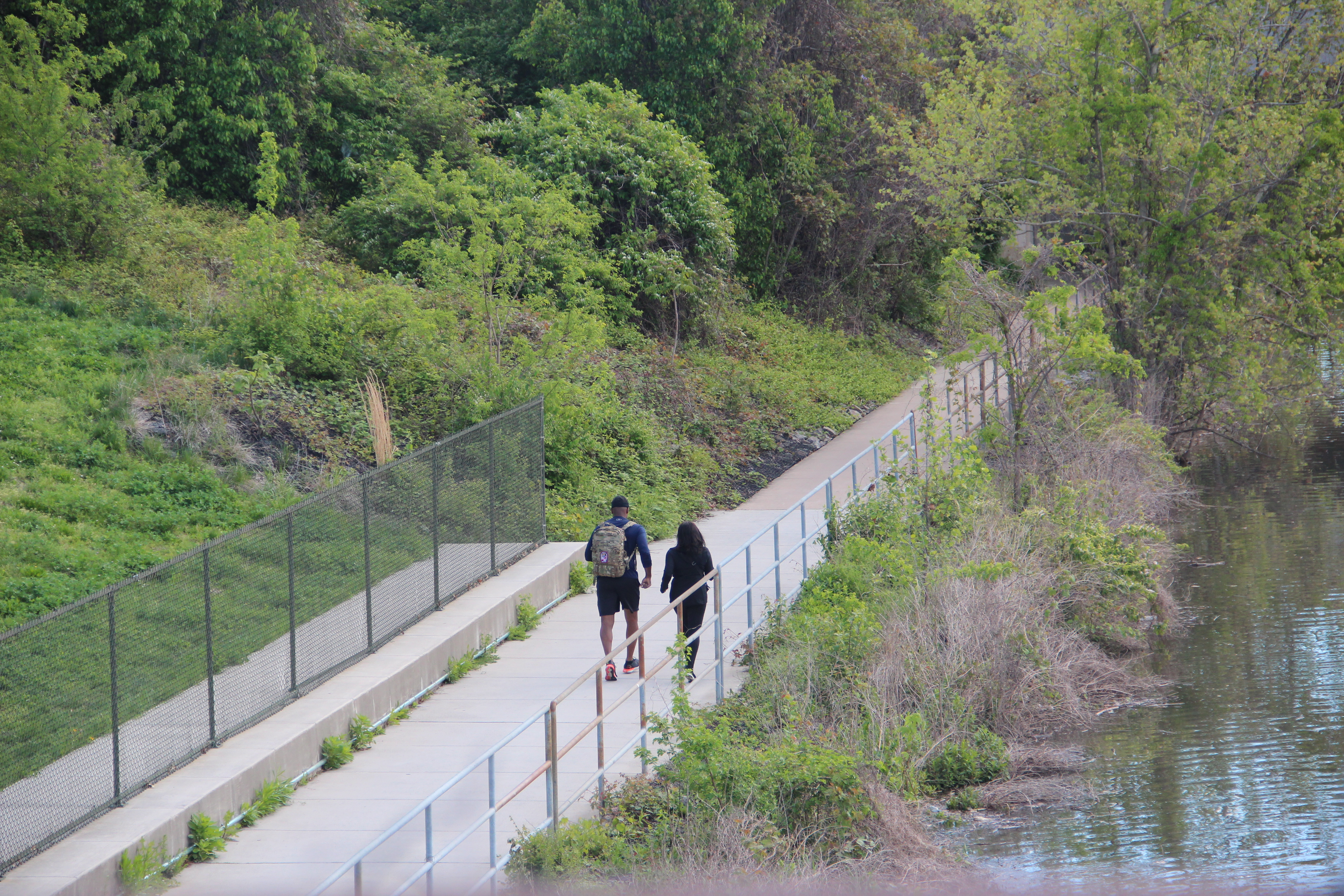
Joggers on the Four Mile Run trail, 2019

The Four Mile Run Trail is a 7-mile long, paved shared use path in Arlington County and Falls Church. It runs along Four Mile Run from Benjamin Banneker Park in Falls Church to the Mount Vernon Trail near Ronald Reagan Washington National Airport, where Four Mile Run empties into the Potomac River. The trail runs roughly parallel to parts of the Washington & Old Dominion Railroad Trail as it follows Four Mile Run, sometimes on the other side of the stream.

== History ==
The trail was the brainchild of Arlington County Board member Thomas Richards, who had been elected in 1964. When he was snowed in at New York's LaGuardia Airport shortly after being elected he used the time, and a AAA road map of Arlington, to sketch out a trail system along Four Mile Run. He saw it as part of a network of trails - including those along Lubber Run, Long Branch and from the Claremont School - stretching from Falls Church to Route 1 on land the county already controlled. The trail could not connect to the George Washington Parkway because the railroad trestle then over Four Mile Run near Potomac yard left no room between the supports. In early 1966 a proposal for the trail was approved by the County Board and later that year Arlington County was one of 12 urban areas to receive a grant from the Department of the Interior as a demonstration of urban trails, the first such grants ever given.

The trail opened on September 4, 1967 as a four-mile, unpaved trail between Roosevelt Street in East Falls Church and Columbia Pike. The Four Mile Run Trail was the first of these trails built, making it the nation's first shared use path built with federal funds. Secretary of the Interior Stewart Udall had created the program in hopes that it would build support for trails legislation he was supporting. That legislation later became the National Trail System Act of 1968. The trail was built adjacent to an existing hiking trail and the still extant W&OD railroad tracks.

In the following years, the trail was paved and expanded. By mid-1968, the trail had been extended south to Walter Reed Drive, though the bike trail ended at Columbia Pike, and north to N. Van Buren Street in the Falls Church section of Benjamin Banneker Park. By 1971, most sections of the trail were paved, but it still had many low-water crossings and cinder-surfaced sections. By 1976, it was extended to Shirlington. At Shirlington, it crossed I-95 on the Shirlington Overpass which had been opened in 1972. By 1977 it was extended west of Broad Street in Falls Church (along the Washington & Old Dominion (W&OD) right-of-way).

In the early 1970's following flooding of Four Mile Run, the Army Corps of Engineers began planning a flood control project that would include rebuilding seven bridges across the stream. Arlington and Alexandria negotiated for the project to include an extended trail - from Shirlington to the Mount Vernon Trail. In 1974, Alexandria announced that the trail from the George Washington Parkway to Shirling would be called the "Wayne F. Anderson bikeway" in honor of the city's departing City Manager. In 1980, the Army completed the flood control project, including new bridges for Route 1, the Potomac Yard railroad, the main rail line and the George Washington Parkway and with that, a section of the Four Mile Run Trail beneath the bridges from Route 1 to the Mount Vernon Trail. Later that spring, the new section was connected to the bridge over I-95. Some time later, signs were erected on the Four Mile Run Trail along Glebe Road in Arlington, and along a trail on the south side of Four Mile Run between Route 1 and Mt. Vernon Avenue branding that as the Wayne F. Anderson Bikeway. (But the sign along Glebe was removed when the I-95 underpass was built in 2009 and the signs in Alexandria were removed between 2015 and 2019. In 2024 signs on Army-Navy drive in Arlington directing cyclists to the bikeway were removed as part of the reconstruction/redesign of that road.)

In 1981–82, the section of trail near Brandymore Castle in Arlington was rebuilt in conjunction with the construction of I-66. The section of trail from the point where Four Mile Run emerges from under I-66 in Arlington County to the bridge over Four Mile Run in Banneker Park then became part of both trails. In the future, Arlington County would like to reroute the W&OD Trail to a separate route outside of the park, thus reducing the amount of joined trail.

In 2009, a trail extension was completed near Shirlington that not only linked the end of the Washington & Old Dominion Railroad Trail with the Four Mile Run Trail, but also allowed trail users to pass under the Shirley Highway (Interstate 395) and W. Glebe Road without having to ride on-street in Shirlington and Alexandria. An underpass was originally to be built as part of the 1970's Four Mile Run project that built the I-95 to Mount Vernon Trail section, but it was not built at that time.
