= Westover, Virginia =

Westover, Virginia, may refer to:

- Westover, Arlington, Virginia, a neighborhood in Arlington, Virginia, United States
- Westover, Charles City County, Virginia, an unincorporated community in Charles City County, Virginia, United States

See also

- Westover, West Virginia
