= Westover, Arlington, Virginia =

- Neighborhood
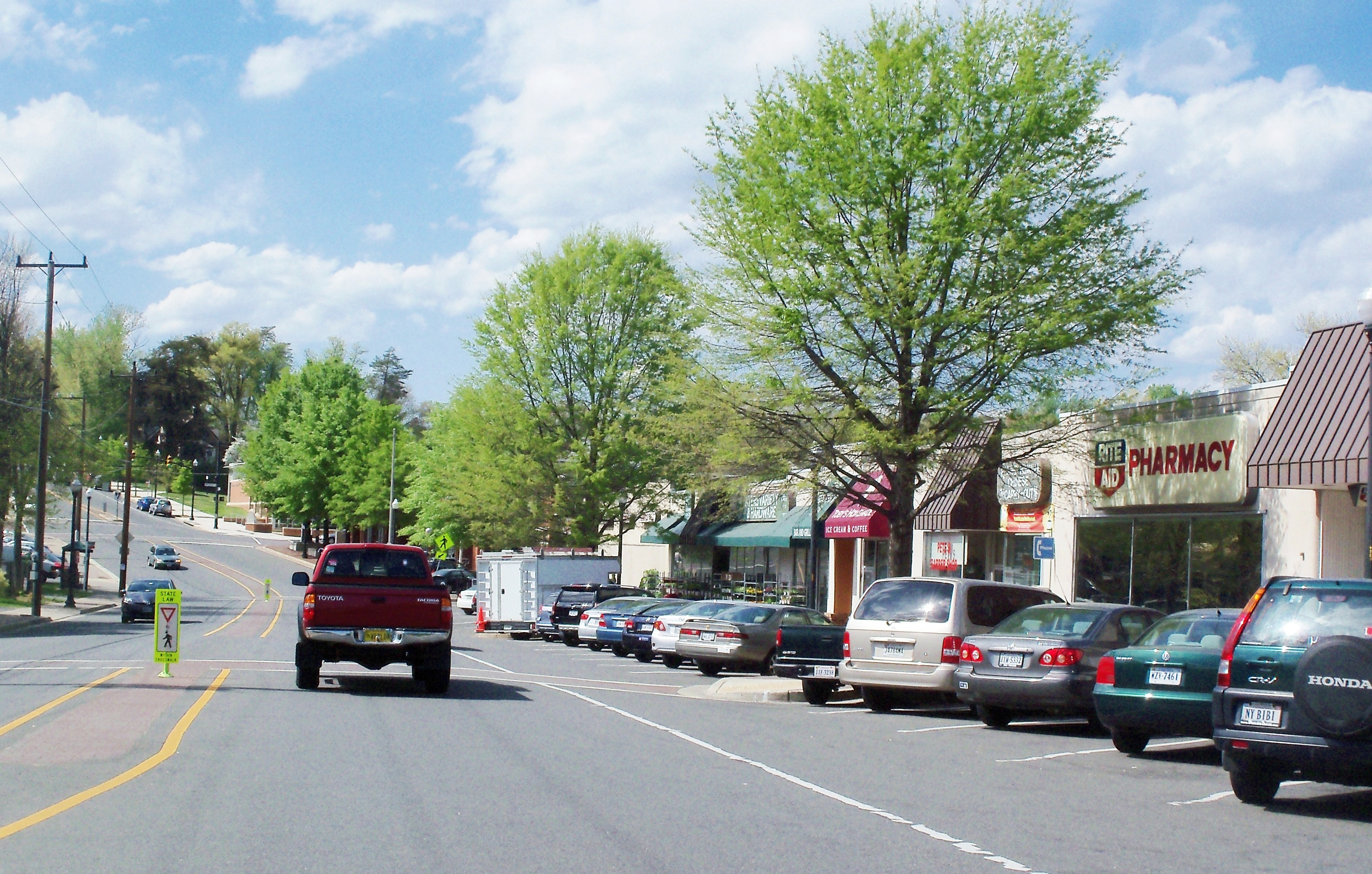
- Westover in Arlington County, Virginia

- Location of Westover in Virginia Westover, Arlington, Virginia (Northern Virginia)
- Coordinates: 38°53′13″N 77°8′22″W
- Country: United States of America
- State: Virginia
- County: Arlington
- Time zone: UTC-5 (Eastern (EST))
  - Summer (DST): UTC-4 (EDT)
- ZIP Codes: 22205
- Area code: 703

Westover is a neighborhood in Arlington County, Virginia, The neighborhood has been named to the National Register of Historic Places. It is centered on Washington Boulevard between North McKinley Road and North Longfellow Street.

== History ==
=== 19th century ===
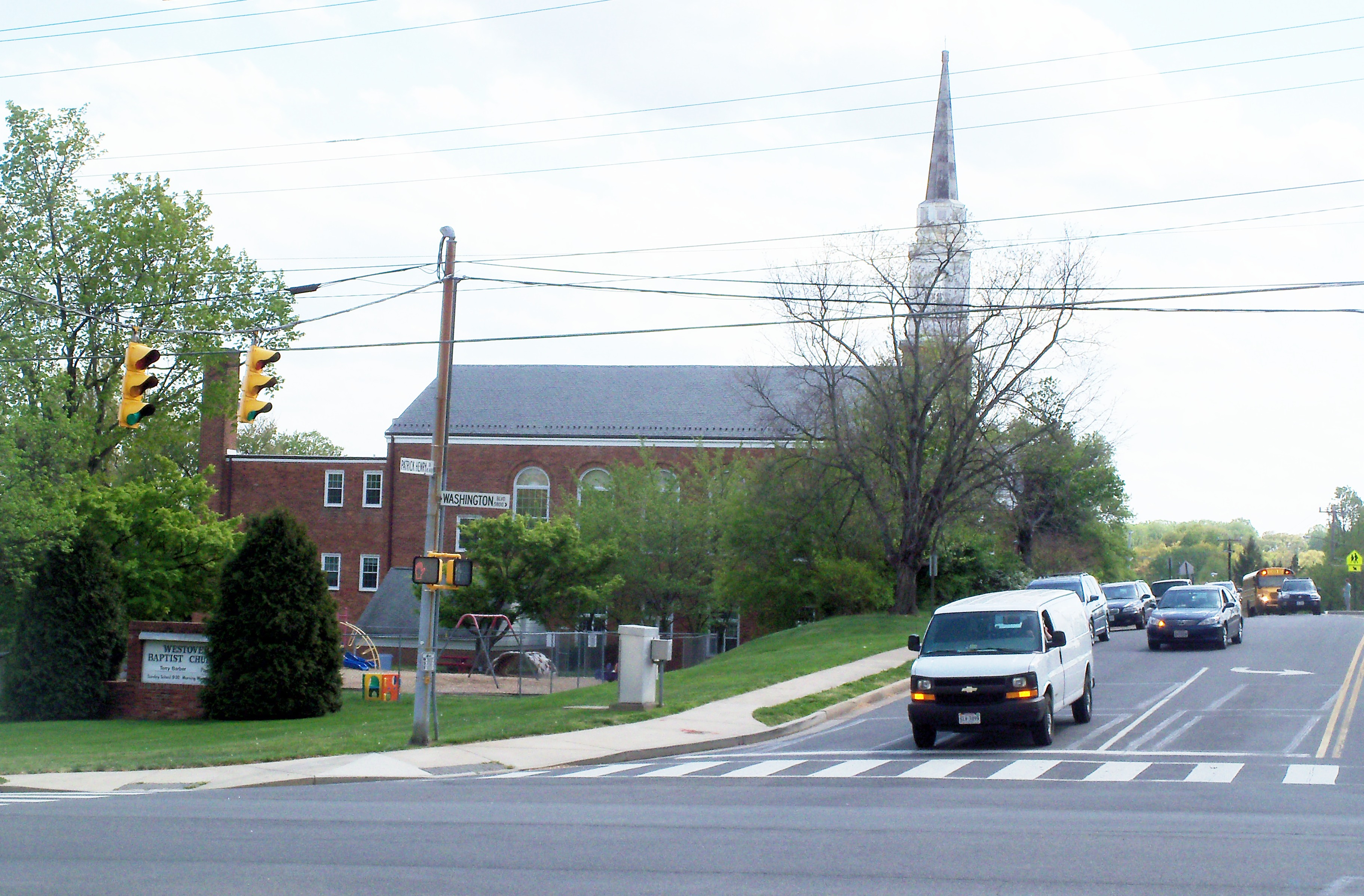
Westover Baptist Church

During the 19th and early 20th centuries, present-day Westover and surrounding Arlington County was almost exclusively agricultural. By the mid-19th century, the property was owned by Nicholas Febrey (1800-1868), a civic leader in Arlington and one of the largest landholders in the area, who bought it from G.W.P. Custis.

In the 1890s, small communities began to develop along newly established electric railways which serviced the area, as real estate developers began subdividing the land. One such community was Fostoria, developed by the Fostoria Land and Development Company in 1890, which took advantage of the Washington, Arlington, and Falls Church Electric Railway. The railroad provided passenger service from Rosslyn to East Falls Church, running along Four Mile Run.

=== 20th century ===
In 1907, present-day Westover was known as Highland Park; the earliest houses constructed in present-day Westover area are in the Highland Park community.

A measure of the development in the area at the time, the Walter Reed Elementary School was constructed in 1938 on McKinley Road, originally a section of Febrey farmland. Though Westover had seen significant development over the previous half century, in 1938, when the school was constructed, the area was still largely undeveloped. By that time, most of Westover was owned primarily by Ashton C. Jones and his wife, Margaret Rucker. Jones deeded the land to the local development company, Mace Properties, Inc., which was owned by Miles A. Mace, a real estate broker, whose firm developed the majority of the buildings located in what is the present-day Westover Historic District between 1939 and 1948.

Following FHA guidelines and responding to the need for affordable housing, Mace developed several economical housing developments in the first half of the 20th century.

In October 1938, Arlington County approved the rezoning of 120 acres (0.49 km^{2}), which allowed Mace Properties to construct large multi-family apartment buildings. In April 1939, Mace Properties announced that it had received FHA approval for low-cost multi-family rental housing. The first of these constructed was a 152 unit garden-style apartment building which cost Mace a total cost of $600,000 to build. In 1940, the FHA-backed Westover Hills project was announced. Westover Hills was hailed as the "most ambitious building program in Mace Properties' [sic] history." The dwellings, including single-family houses, twin houses, and garden apartments, were designed by Thelander and Washington, D.C. architect Harry E. Ormston.

During 1940, the Westover Shopping Center was constructed—a 13-store retail center along Washington Boulevard between Longfellow and McKinley Streets. The shopping center initially included a Safeway grocery store, a "five and dime" store, and a pharmacy. In 1958, county planners noted that the center's "retail sales per store [were] higher... than in any of the five nearby competing neighborhood or community centers. " However, by the late seventies, the center's physical condition and sales had declined. In 1978, the Arlington County Board allocated $50,000 in business and neighborhood conservation funds to supplement $250,000 worth of exterior renovation work planned by the center's owners.

Today, Westover is a residential suburban community and its overall character remains predominately unchanged. The shopping center continues to provide a mix of retail offerings to the community. Residences in the neighborhood are still composed mostly of modest, pre-World War II single family homes and garden style apartment complexes. Like those in most older suburban neighborhoods, the dwellings in Westover have been adapted to fit modern-day needs and growing families. In many instances, porches have been enclosed and/or enlarged for additional bathrooms.

== Transit ==
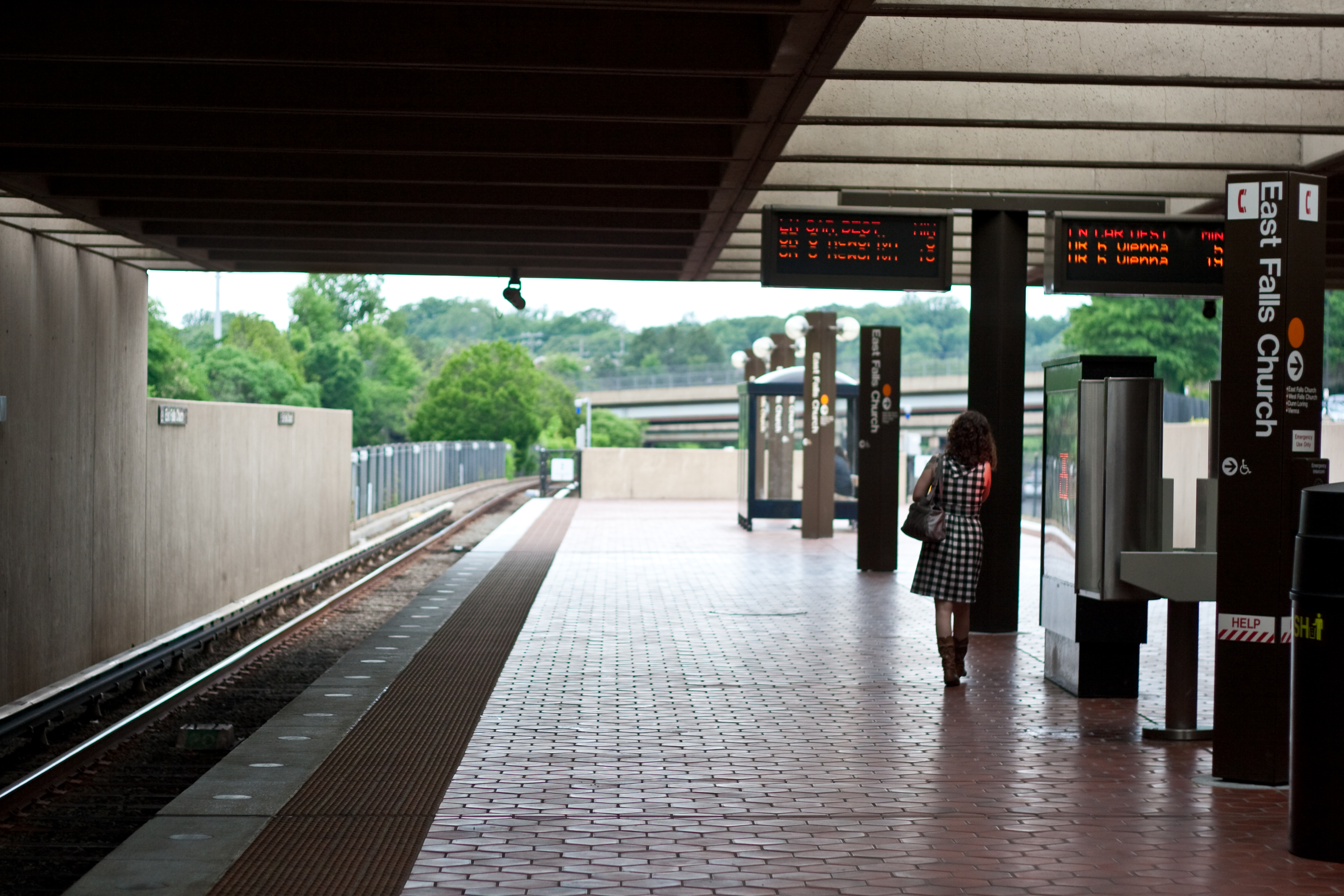
East Falls Church station's platform

Westover has access to many modes of transportation, both public and private. Approximately 22% of people within Westover's Zip Code (22205) use transit other than a private vehicle to get to work, as of 2016.

The central artery in Westover is Washington Boulevard which serves as a commercial focal point as well as a regional connector.

Westover is situated between exits 69 and 71 on I-66.

East Falls Church station, part of the Silver Line and Orange Line of the Washington Metro, is nearby in the county.

MetroBus serves Westover via its 2A, 2B, 2C, and 2G lines which run down Washington Boulevard. Arlington Transit line 52, an Arlington County-managed bus system, passes through Westover.

Washington & Old Dominion Railroad Regional Park and Custis Trail also pass through Southern Westover, connecting Westover to Falls Church to the west and the Rosslyn-Ballston corridor and Washington, D.C. to the east.

== Buildings ==
=== Reed School ===
Walter Reed School, c. 1939

Westover is home to Walter Reed School, built in 1938 and reopened in October 2009 after significant renovations. It currently serves as a pre-school and public library, having served as an elementary school from 1938 to 1984.

Walter Reed Elementary School was built in 1938 by contractor T. Calvin Owens on what was farmland at the time. In 1950, the school was expanded and altered. A new 8 classroom wing and mechanical room were added to the rear of the building, while lower level rooms were converted to a library, teachers room, clinic and conference room. To cope with further population growth, in 1966 an octagonal classroom building was constructed.

By the 1980s, the Reed School building was deemed unsuitable for use as an elementary school according to modern standards. It contained large amounts of asbestos and lead paint, was extremely difficult to heat and cool, and was plagued by problems with mold and excessive humidity. It also was not wheelchair-accessible. Due to the physical problems in the building, declining enrollment, and the view of then-school superintendent Charles M. Nunley, the school ceased functioning as a traditional educational facility in 1984. Other schools were not within walking distance from Westover, and a county-funded study predicted that, within 20 years, Reed School would be needed to meet the needs of the projected population.

On May 9, 2008, a groundbreaking ceremony was held at the Reed School site for the $21.6M Reed School/Westover Library project. The project included tearing down the entire building, with the exception of the original 1938 shell, and rebuilding into a 61,000-square-foot (5,700 m^{2}) building which houses the new Westover Branch Library and several public pre-school programs. The library reopened on October 31, 2009, having been relocated from its former location approximately one block northeast.

By 2010, as predicted, the elementary schools that had absorbed Reed's student population; McKinley and Tuckahoe elementary schools were the most overcrowded in the county, and the county considered expanding Reed to serve as an elementary school again. In 2014, the Reed building was considered as a new location for the H-B Woodlawn Secondary Program. After neighborhood objection, citing the proximity of another secondary school and a new-found desire for a neighborhood elementary school, the district chose another location for H-B Woodlawn.

Due to neighborhood objections and recent construction at the site, a location on the campus of Williamsburg Middle School was chosen instead, where Discovery Elementary School opened in 2015.

In 2017, the Arlington School Board approved construction at the Reed site of a new neighborhood elementary school, and the new school was slotted for opening in 2021.

=== Cardinal Elementary School ===
The newly renovated and expanded Reed Building is now host to the new Cardinal Elementary School, which started accepting students in fall of 2021. Cardinal Elementary School has absorbed most students from McKinley Elementary, which now hosts Arlington Traditional School. Cardinal Elementary also accepted some Tuckahoe students, since Tuckahoe is overcrowded. Cardinal Elementary School is named as such to make McKinley students, whose mascot was the cardinal, feel better at Cardinal. Cardinal ES currently has 683 students enrolled.

=== Swanson Middle School ===
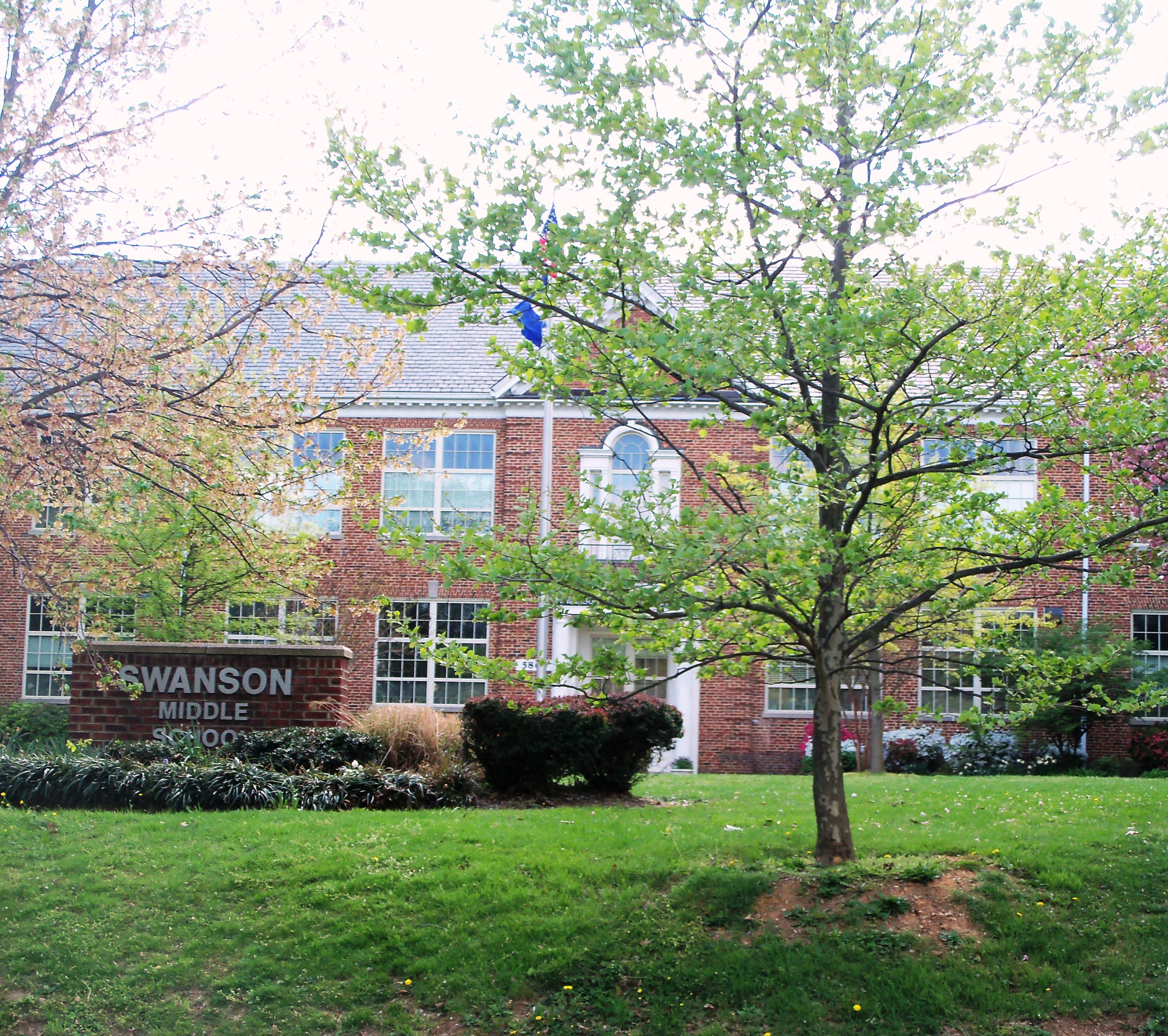
Swanson Middle School

Swanson Middle School is located at the intersection of Patrick Henry Drive and Washington Boulevard in Westover. Built in 1939, Swanson is part of the Arlington Historic District and is the oldest operating junior high in Arlington. Originally a 7-9th grade school, it currently serves 6-8th grade students.

Swanson Junior High School, built by contractor E. A. Pessagnolo for a cost of $200,941, opened in 1939 on land formerly occupied by the A. Duke Torreyson family farm. In 1955, a large addition off the North side was constructed to add classroom space. In 1963 and 1968, the central courtyard of the original design was filled in via two additions which accommodated a gymnasium, classrooms, a library, and mechanical rooms.

In 1958, Swanson was the focus of a racial desegregation controversy when it came under court order to admit an African American student. The student was "one of seven [plaintiffs] who can attempt to enter white schools under a court order." State officials threatened to shut the school down in the fall to avoid the desegregation. Ultimately, integration did not actually take place until 1959, when several African American students were admitted to Stratford Junior High School.
