= Westover Historic District =

Historic district in Virginia, United States

- U.S. National Register of Historic Places
- U.S. Historic district
- Virginia Landmarks Register
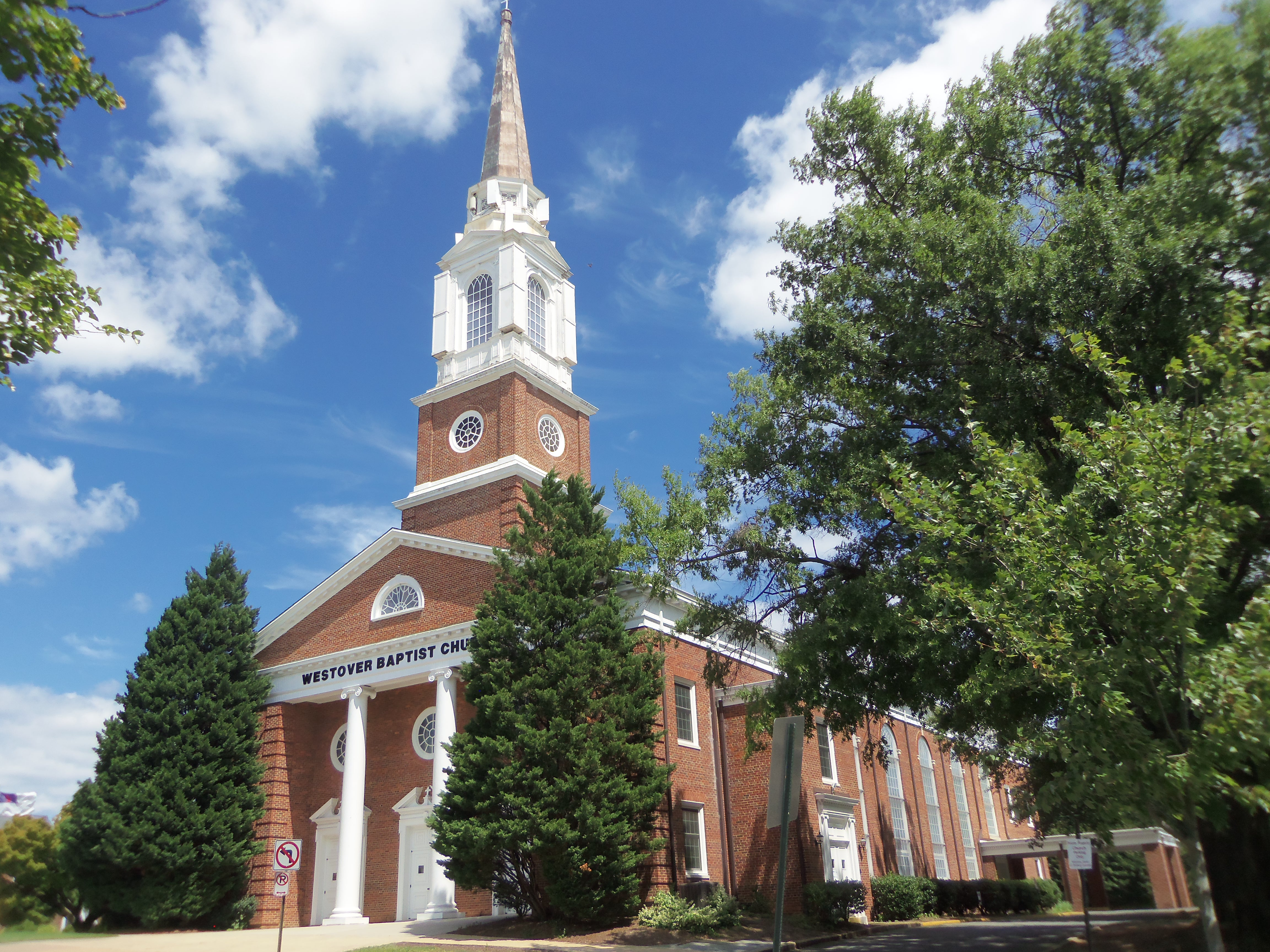
- Westover Baptist Church

- Location within District of Columbia Location within Virginia Location within the United States
- Location: Bounded by McKinley Rd., N. Washington Blvd., N. 16th St., N. Jefferson St., N. 11th St. and N. Fairfax Dr., Arlington, Virginia
- Coordinates: 38°52′58″N 77°8′11″W
- Area: 173.4 acres (70.2 ha)
- Built: 1939-1957
- Built by: Keene, E. Ray; Mace Properties, et al.
- Architectural style: Colonial Revival, Moderne
- MPS: Garden Apartments, Apartment Houses and Apartment Complexes in Arlington County, Virginia MPS
- NRHP reference No.: 06000345
- VLR No.: 000-0032

Significant dates
- Added to NRHP: May 2, 2006
- Designated VLR: March 18, 2006

The Westover Historic District is a national historic district located at Westover, Arlington County, Virginia. It contains 383 contributing buildings and 1 contributing site in a residential neighborhood in northern Arlington. The neighborhood was constructed in five phases between 1939 and 1957: Westover Apartments, Westover Hills, Keene's Addition to Westover, Westover Park, and Mason's Addition to Westover. The neighborhood consists of Colonial Revival-style single-family dwellings, twin houses, duplexes, and multi-family garden apartments. Also in the district are a shopping center, the Claude A. Swanson Junior High School, the Westover Baptist Church, and Swanson Park.

It was listed on the National Register of Historic Places in 2006.
