= Sugarland Run Valley Stream Trail =

Virginian trail path

Coordinates: 39°0′22.5″N 77°22′27.5″W

The Sugarland Run Valley Stream Trail is part of the Fairfax County, Virginia countywide trail system. The main portion of the asphalt trail runs approximately 3 miles, although a newer section of trail, which connects to the Washington & Old Dominion Trail, extends the length of the main trail to approximately 4 miles. There are also many tributaries of this trail, several of which terminate in neighborhoods in the Town of Herndon, VA.

The trail passes by several basketball courts, and is a very popular trail for jogging and dog-walking. During very rainy periods, many (if not all) of the "fair weather crossings" may become impassible. These crossings mostly consist of flat, cylindrical concrete columns forming a step-way across the stream. During less rainy periods, stream crossings tend to not be very deep, and most dogs can usually traverse the crossing without completely submerging.

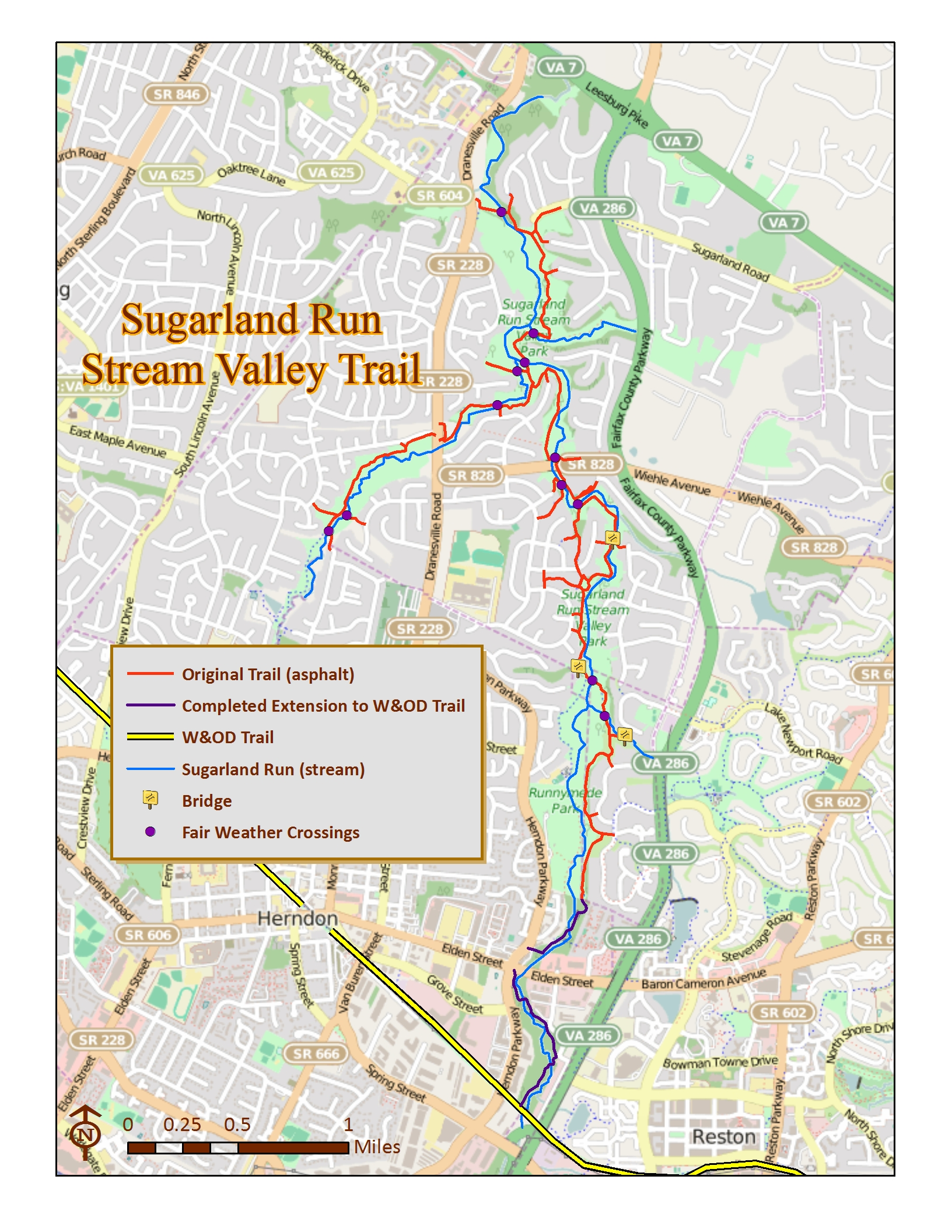
Sugarland Run Stream Valley Trail

The first section of the trail, from Sugarland Road to Runnymeade Park, was constructed prior to 1997. In 1998, with funding from a settlement with Colonial Pipeline Company for an oil spill and federal TEA-21 and CMAQ funding, design work began on a 1 mile extension to connect the trail to the Washington & Old Dominion Trail. Construction on the extension began in 2004 and completed in October 2005. It included almost 6,000 linear feet of paved trail, eight bridges for stream crossings and a boardwalk through a wetland area. In 2019 nearly 12,000 liner feet of the trail were repaired.
