= Washington and Old Dominion Railroad Regional Park =

Regional park in Northern Virginia, United States

Washington & Old Dominion Railroad Trail
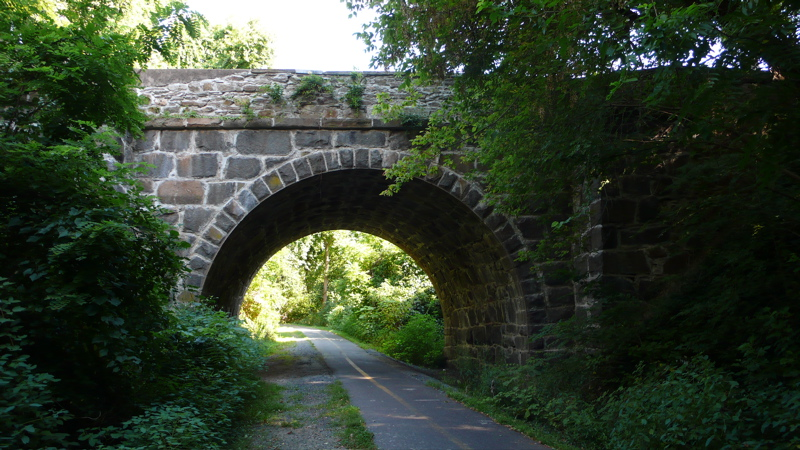
- Stone arch at Clarke's Gap northwest of Leesburg, Virginia in August 2008
- Length: 44.7 mi (71.9 km)
- Location: Virginia, U.S.
- Trailheads: East: Shirlington in Arlington County, Virginia, U.S. West: Purcellville in Loudoun County, Virginia, U.S.
- Use: Biking; Horseback riding Running; Hiking
- Elevation change: 469 ft (143 m)
- Highest point: Clarke's Gap, 610 ft (190 m)
- Lowest point: Shirlington, 141 ft (43 m)
- Difficulty: Easy
- Season: All

Trail map
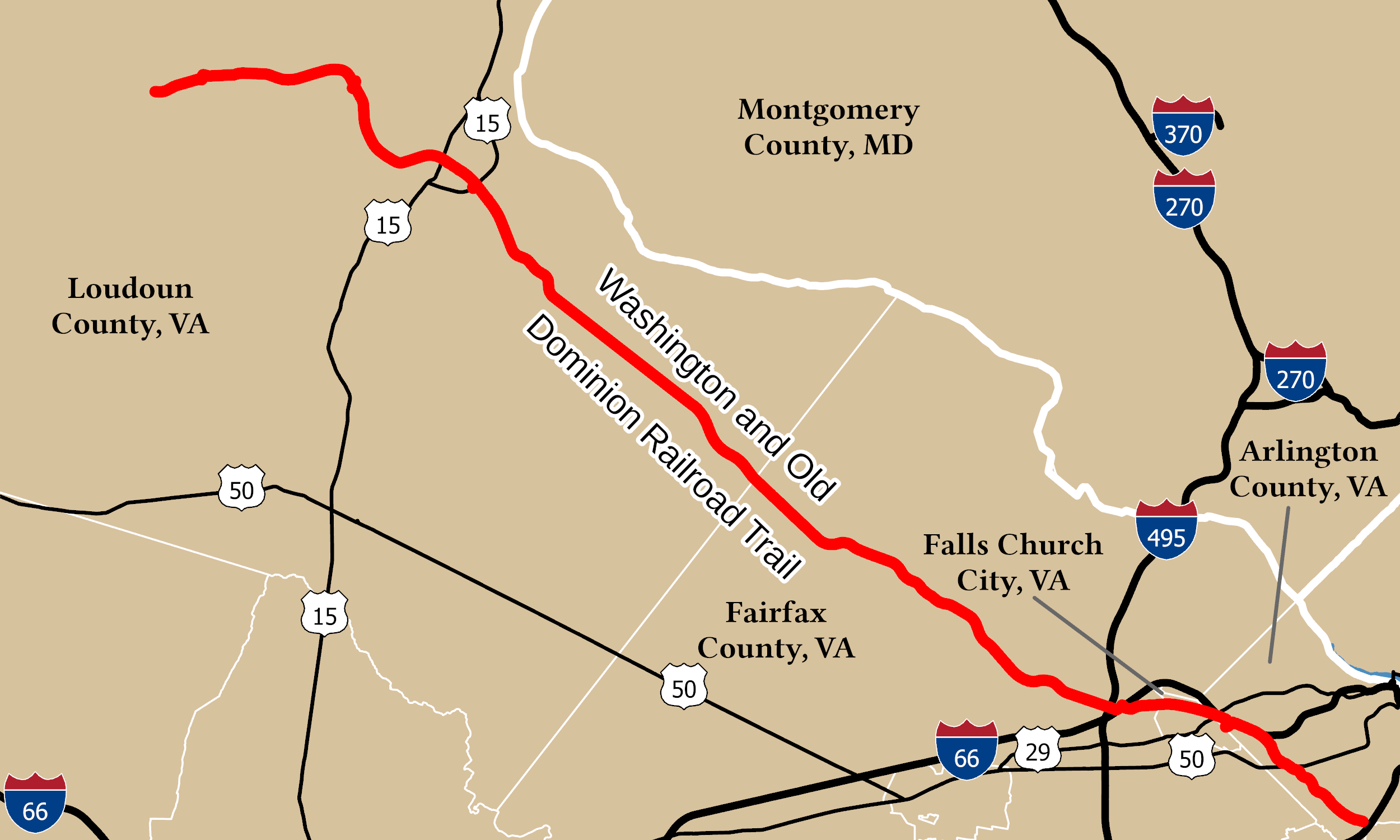

The Washington and Old Dominion Railroad Regional Park is a linear regional park in Northern Virginia. The park's primary feature is the Washington and Old Dominion Railroad Trail (abbreviated as W&OD Trail), an asphalt-surfaced paved rail trail that runs through densely populated urban and suburban communities as well as through rural areas. Most of the trail travels on top of the rail bed of the former Washington and Old Dominion Railroad, which closed in 1968.

Although the park is 44.6 miles (71.8 km) long, it is only about 100 feet (30 m) wide. The rail trail is approximately 10 feet (3.0 m) wide through much of its length and is a shared use path that is suitable for walking, running, cycling, and roller skating.

A crushed bluestone–surfaced bridle path travels near the paved trail in the park's most westerly 33 miles (53 km). The path is suitable for horseback riding and mountain biking.

NOVA Parks administers and maintains the park and its trails. NOVA Parks keeps most of the parkland surrounding the trails in a natural state. The park authority has placed alongside the paved trail a series of mile markers and a number of interpretative exhibits that describe the historic and natural features of the park (see Washington and Old Dominion Railroad Stations for locations of historical markers near the W&OD Trail).

The headquarters office of the park is near the southwest side of the trail at Smith's Switch Road in Ashburn. A park rest stop is adjacent to the trail near the park's headquarters.

== Route ==
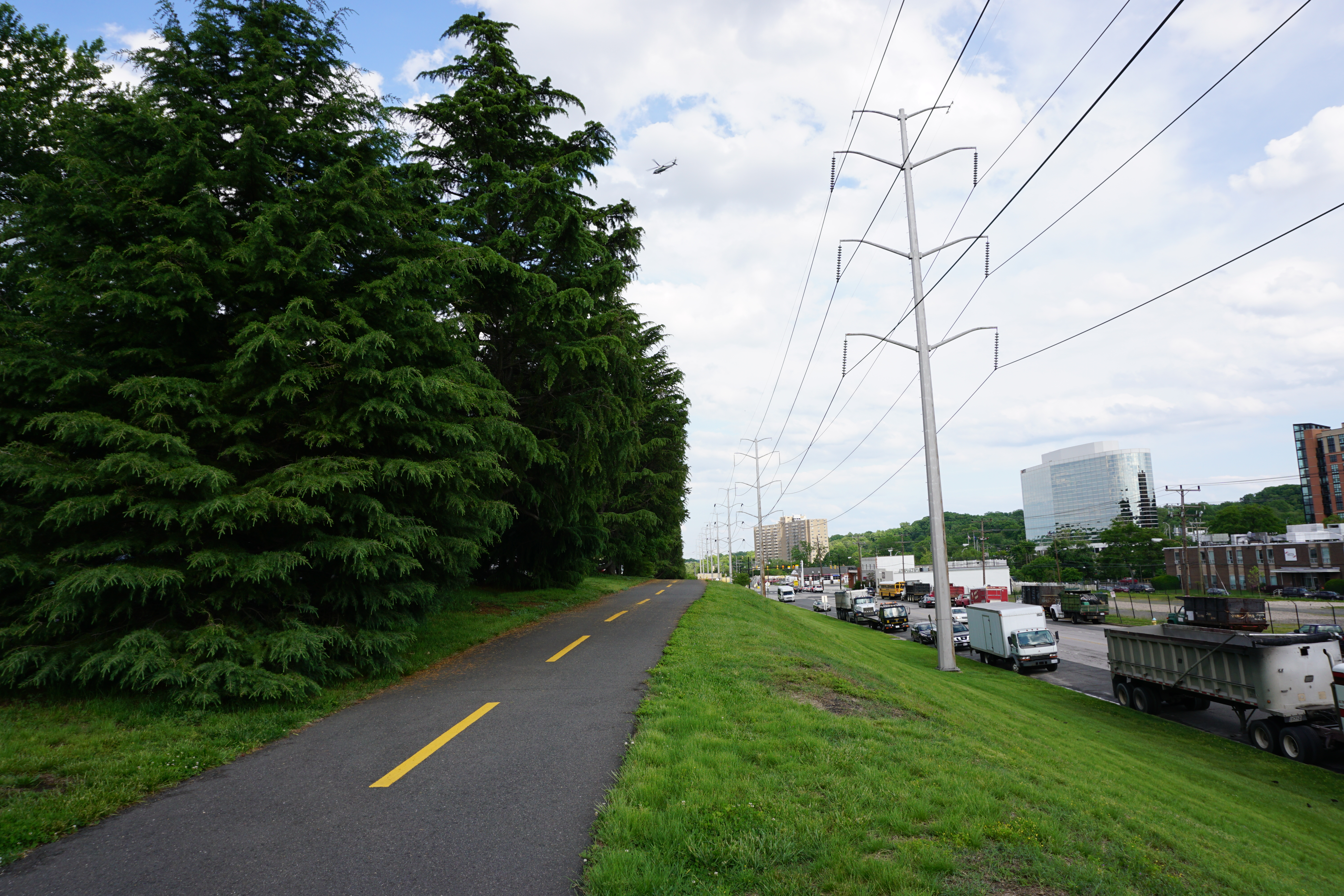
Looking east towards the start of the W&OD Trail in Arlington County (May 2014)

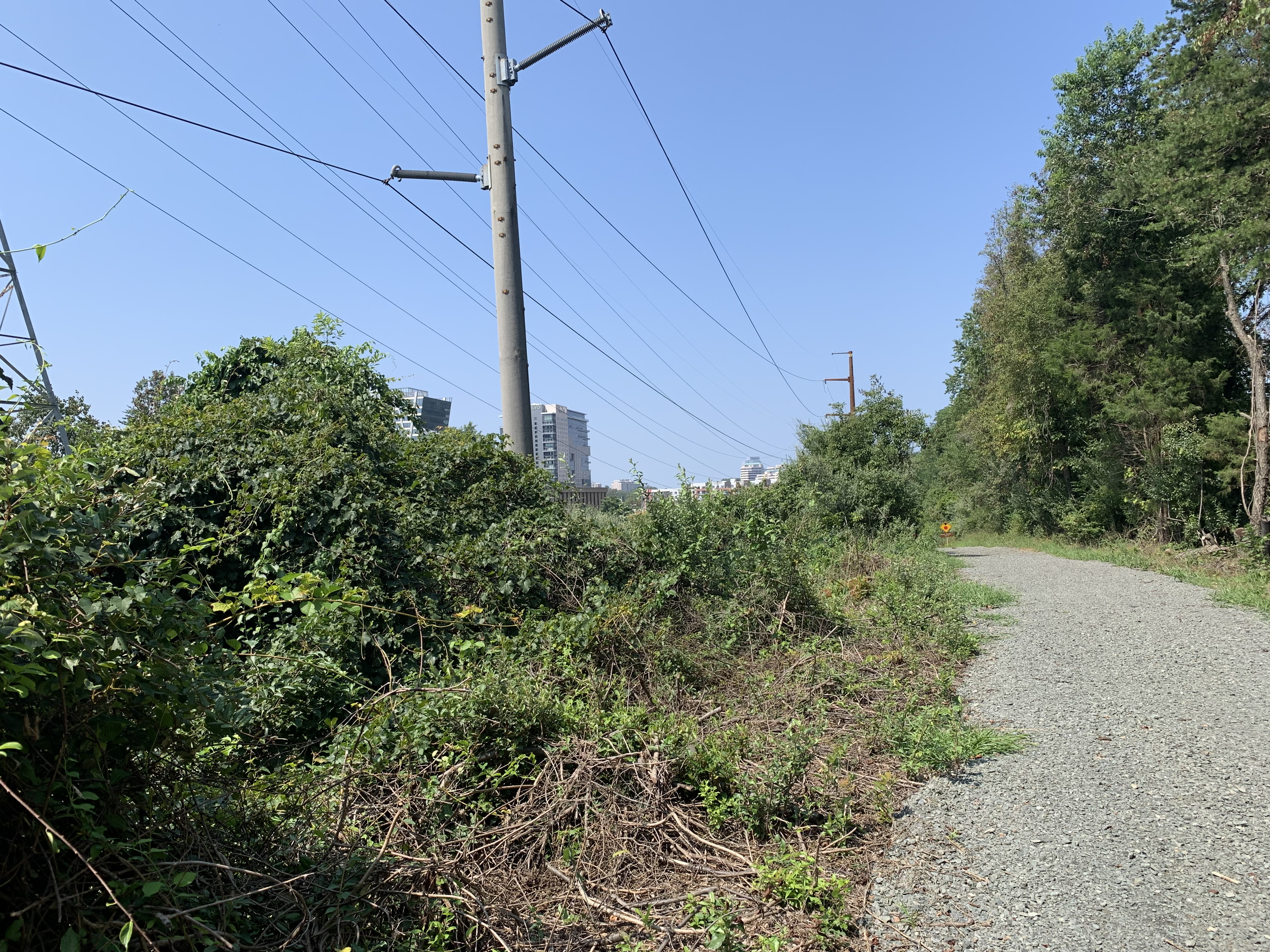
The W&OD crushed bluestone bridle path just east of the junction with Wiehle Avenue (VA-828) in Reston, Virginia in August 2021.

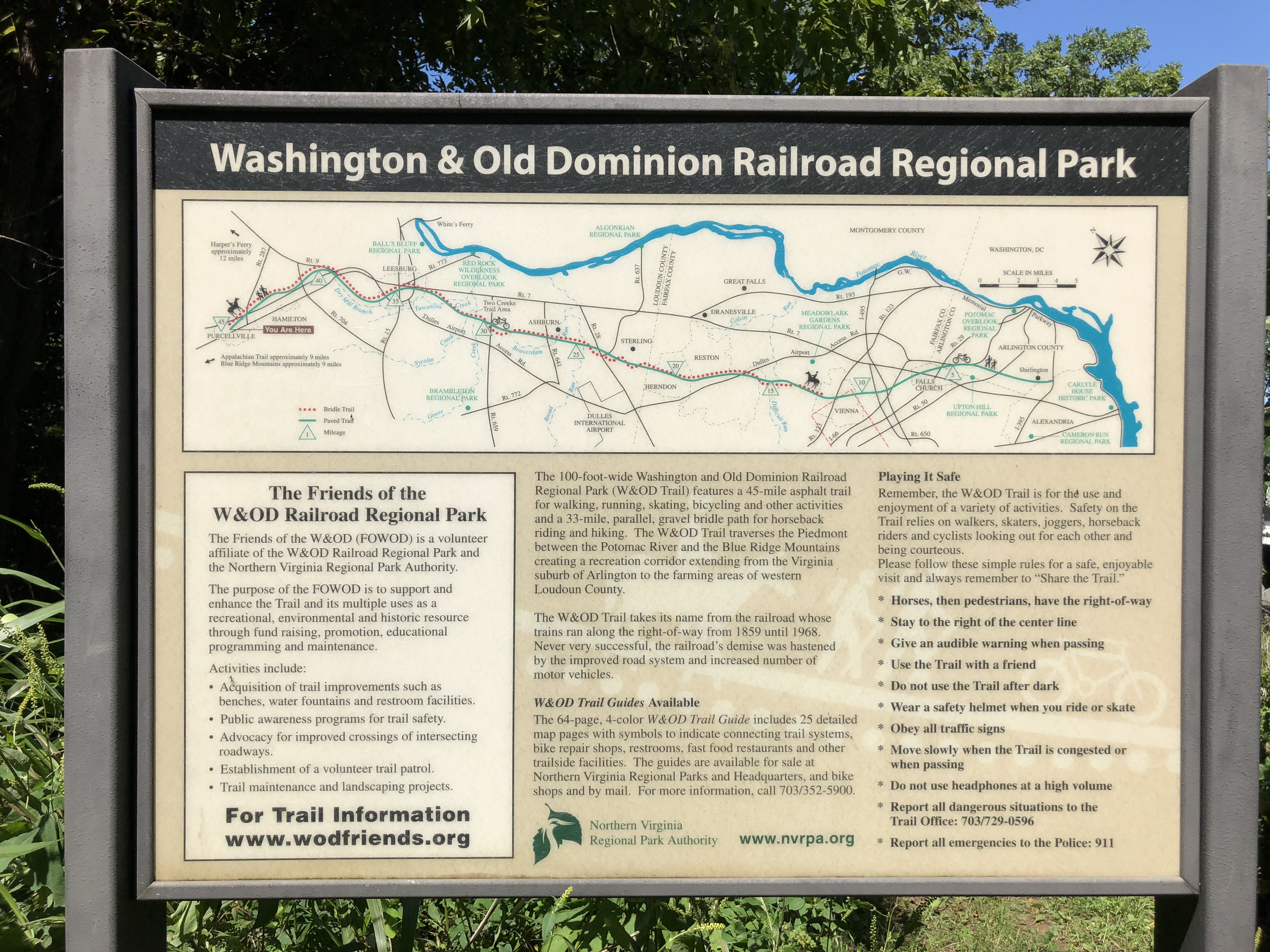
Marker at end of the W&OD Trail in Purcellville showing the trail's route (August 2018)

W&OD Trail Elevation Map (2008)

The W&OD Trail begins in the Nauck neighborhood near the Shirlington section of Arlington County, close to the boundary between the County and the City of Alexandria. The trail ends in Purcellville in western Loudoun County. Its route largely parallels the routes of the Potomac River and Virginia State Route 7 (VA 7).

The trail connects at its origin to the paved Four Mile Run Trail, which travels eastward through Arlington along a stream embankment to meet the Mount Vernon Trail at Ronald Reagan Washington National Airport, near the Potomac River. The start of the trail is also accessible from the Shirlington exit (Exit 6) of Interstate 395 (I-395) (the Henry G. Shirley Memorial Highway).

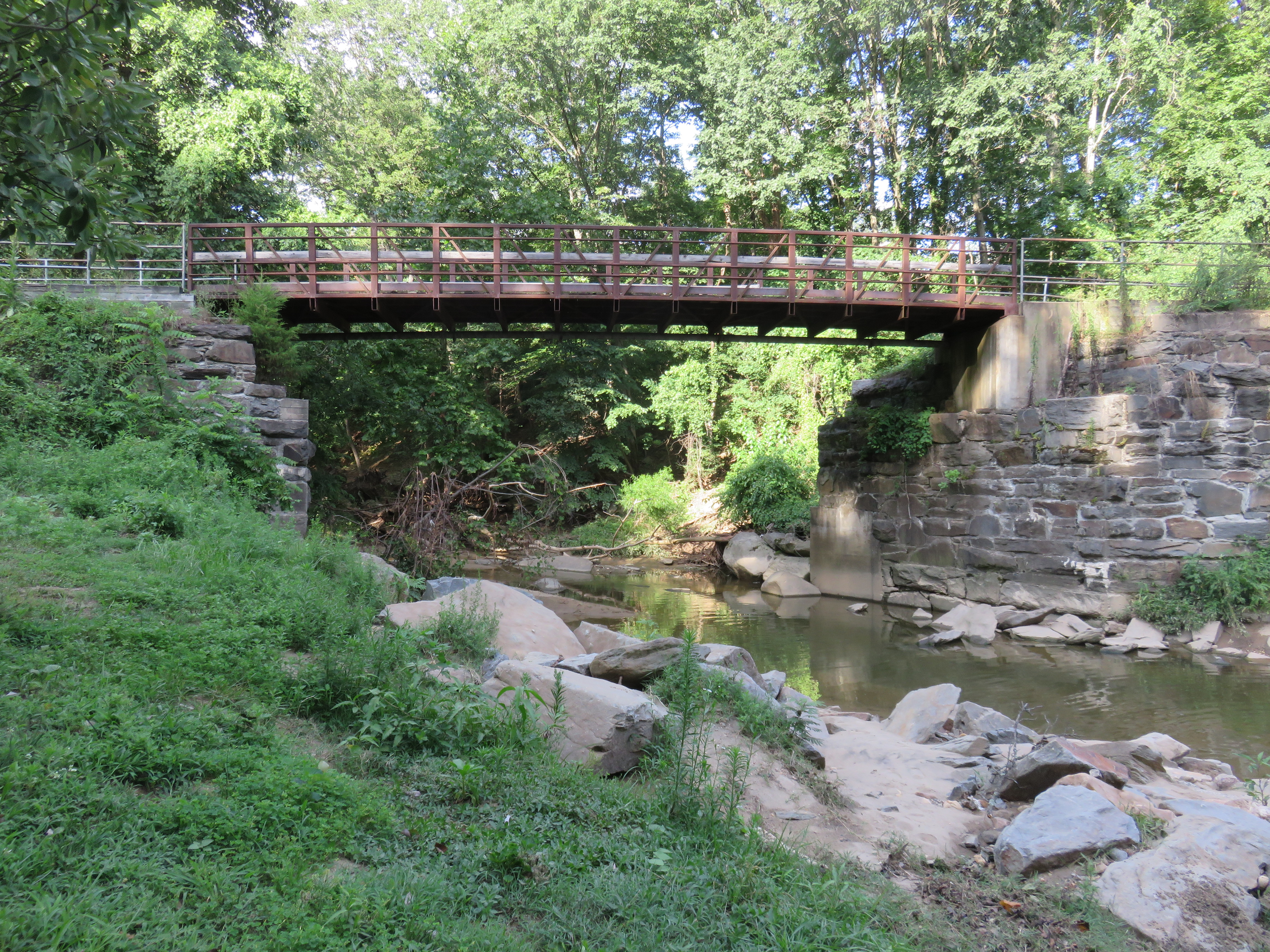
Bridge over Four Mile Run in Glencarlyn Park south of Arlington Boulevard (U.S. Route 50) (July 2020)

The trail parallels the more curving and hilly Four Mile Run Trail throughout its route in Arlington. Although they coincide in several locations, the two trails generally travel on opposite sides of the Run. There are no restrooms and few water fountains alongside the W&OD Trail in the County. Restrooms and additional water fountains are available near ball fields and picnic areas along the Four Mile Run Trail. The W&OD Trail's trailhead (Mile 0) is at the intersection of South Shirlington Road and South Four Mile Run Drive. The trail starts in the Atlantic Coastal Plain at the trail's lowest elevation: 72 feet (22 m) above sea level.

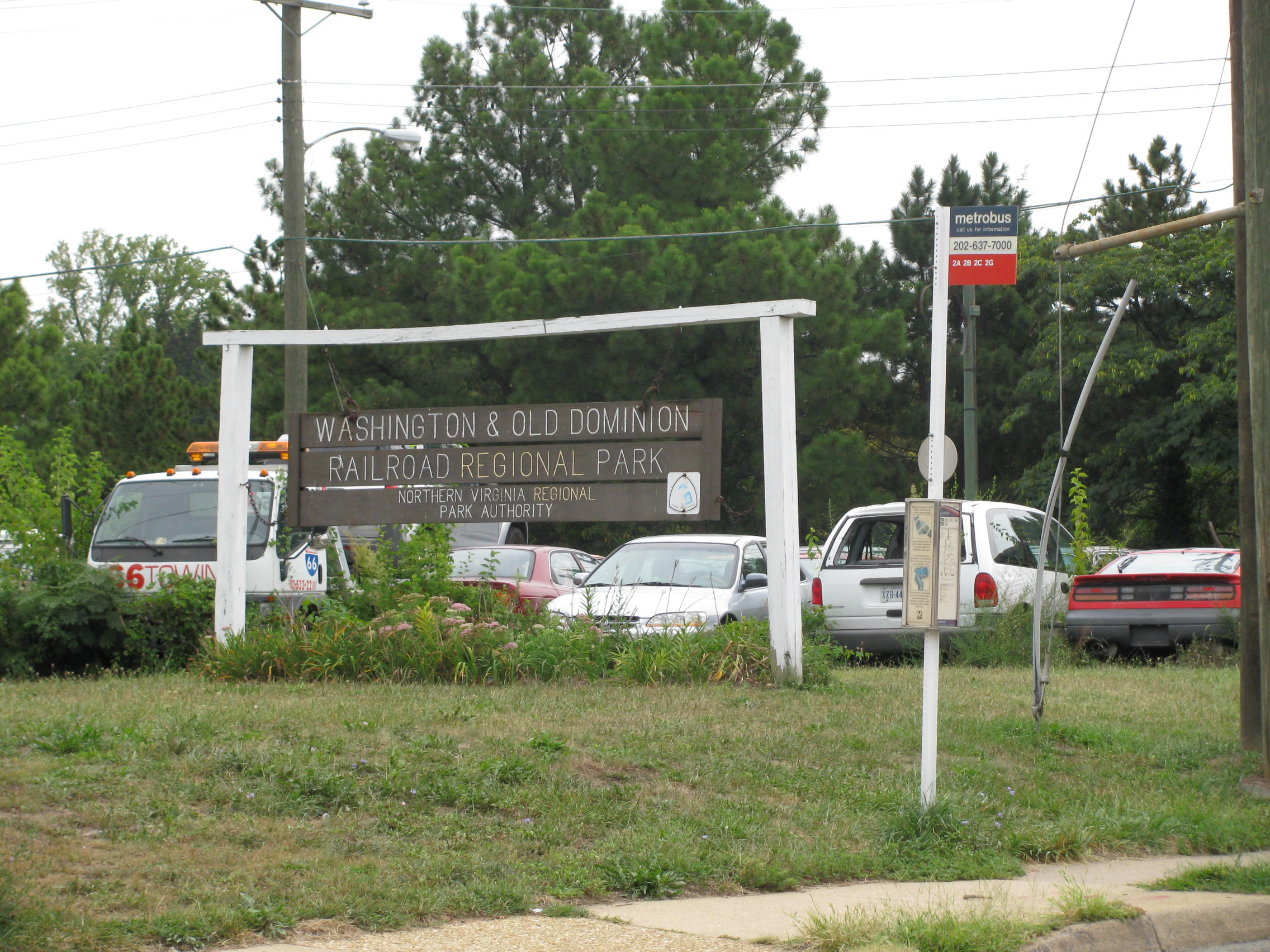
W&OD Railroad Regional Park sign in Falls Church (September 2012)

The trail climbs 213 feet (65 m) in 5.8 miles (9.3 km) while traveling northwest through Arlington County. While in Arlington, the trail ascends through the Atlantic Seaboard fall line while climbing upstream in the valley of Four Mile Run. The trail crosses the Run seven times in the valley on bridges whose abutments were constructed before the Civil War by the Alexandria, Loudoun & Hampshire Railroad, a predecessor of the W&OD Railroad.

After crossing Columbia Pike (VA 244), the trail enters a steeply-sloped woodland that covers both sides of the valley. The trail crosses under Arlington Boulevard (U.S. Route 50) while within the woodland.

Near the end of the woodland, the trail intersects the Bluemont Junction Trail, a 1.3 miles (2.1 km) long paved rail trail that travels to Ballston on the bed of a former W&OD Railroad branch that once ran to Rosslyn and Georgetown. 0.6 miles (1.0 km) past that intersection, the W&OD Trail intersects the Custis Trail, a 4.5 miles (7.2 km) long paved shared use path that travels along Interstate 66 (I-66) (the Custis Memorial Parkway) to Rosslyn and which provides access to Washington, D.C. and the northern end of the Mount Vernon Trail.

After crossing its intersection with the Custis Trail, the W&OD Trail travels northwest near an I-66 soundwall for most of its remaining course in Arlington. After crossing under North Sycamore Street next to Four Mile Run, the W&OD Trail crosses over the Run and passes the East Falls Church station on Washington Metro's Orange and Silver Lines.

After leaving the fall line, the W&OD Trail enters the Piedmont plateau region near the west corner of the County. The trail continues to climb in the Piedmont while traveling northwest through the City of Falls Church and Fairfax County.

The trail reaches an elevation of 489 feet (149 m) at its crossing of I-66 in Fairfax County. When it reaches this point, the trail has risen 417 feet (127 m) while traveling 8.4 miles (13.5 km).

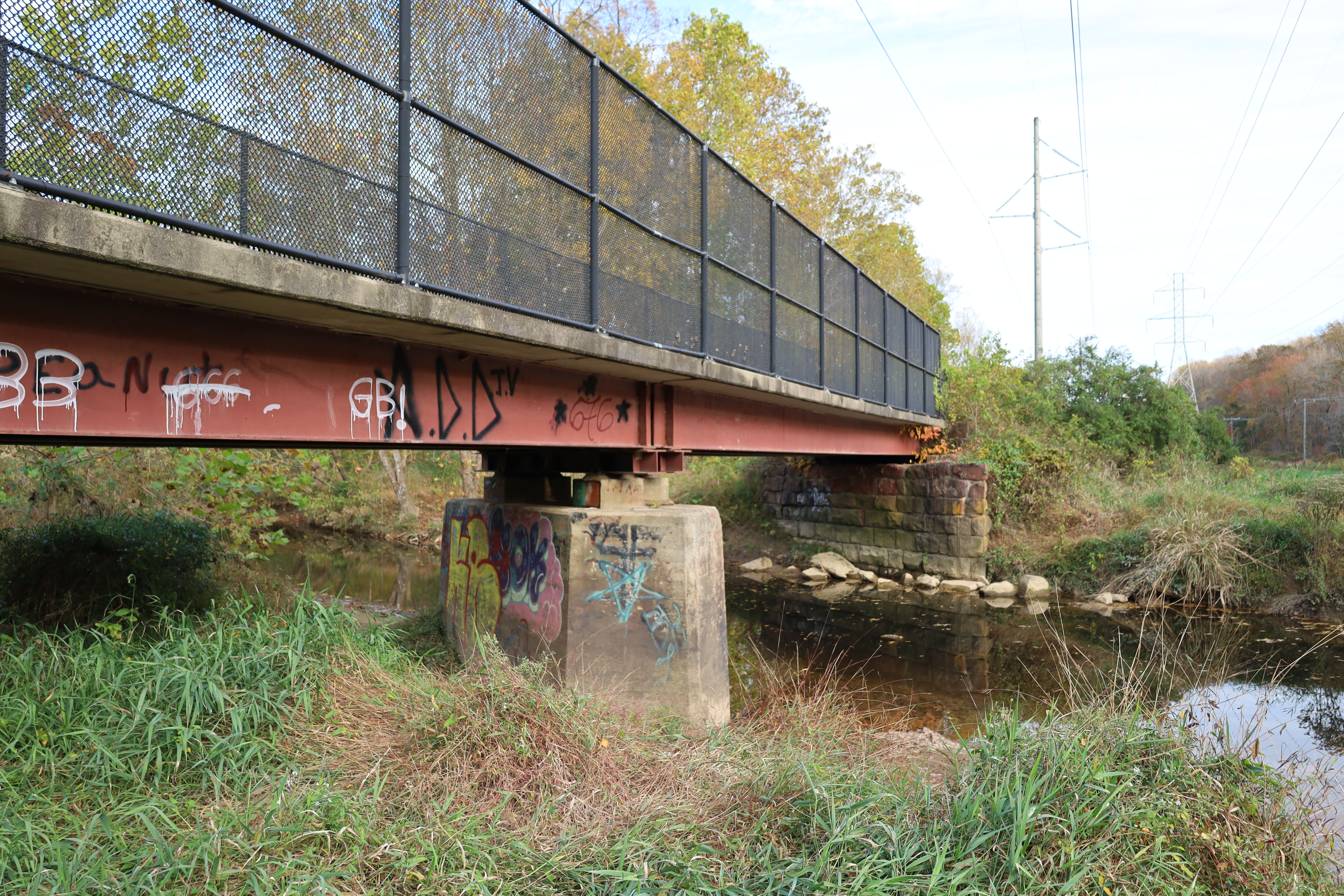
Bridge over Difficult Run in Fairfax County (October 2020)

After crossing over I-495 (the Capital Beltway) on a trail bridge and passing Dunn Loring, the trail begins a long descent as it travels through Vienna. After leaving Vienna, the trail continues to descend until it reaches Mile 14, where its elevation of 242 feet (74 m) is only 170 feet (52 m) higher than is its elevation at the trail's origin.

After the trail crosses Difficult Run (Mile 14.3), it ascends and descends between additional streams (including Sugarland Run, Broad Run, Beaverdam Run, Goose Creek, Sycolin Creek and Tuscarora Creek) as it travels further northwest in the Piedmont through or near Reston, Herndon, Sterling, Ashburn, and Leesburg. While traveling through Reston, the trail crosses Wiehle Avenue (VA 828), 0.3 miles (0.5 km) northeast of the Wiehle–Reston East station on Washington Metro's Silver Line.

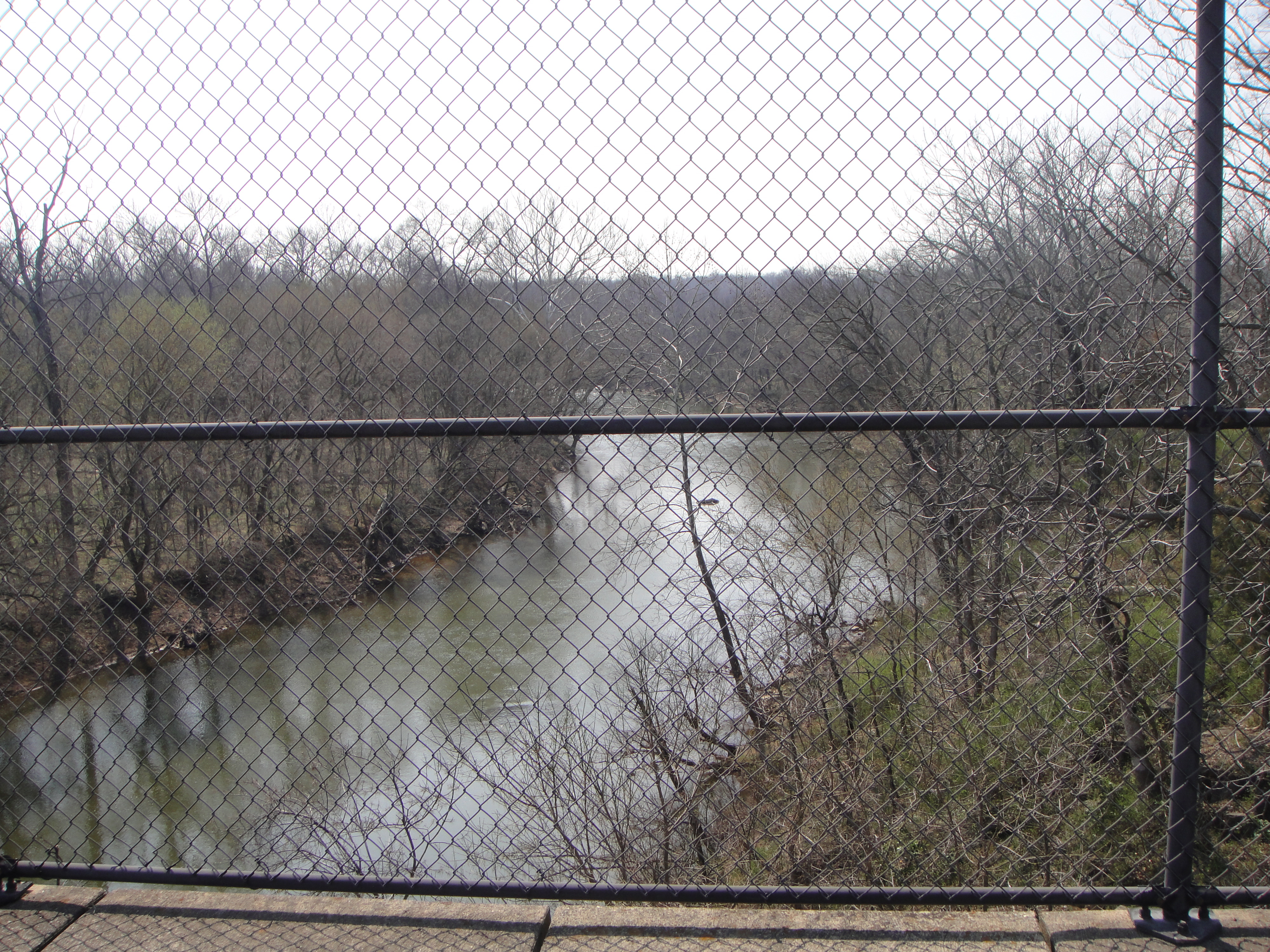
View of Goose Creek from the W&OD Trail in March 2012

When crossing Tuscarora Creek in Leesburg, the trail's elevation of 315 feet (96 m) is only 2 feet (0.61 m) higher than the highest elevation 313 feet (95 m) that it reached in Arlington. After crossing that stream, the trail climbs northwest in 6.0 miles (9.7 km) to reach its highest elevation (606 feet (185 m)) while traveling on a bridge carrying VA 9 (Charles Town Pike) over VA 7 near the saddle point of Clarke's Gap in Catoctin Mountain. 0.3 miles (0.48 km) before this crossing, the trail travels under an old stone arch that formerly carried VA 7 over the W&OD Railroad.

The trail then turns west, descends through Paeonian Springs to Hamilton Station and climbs to reach Purcellville. When the trail terminates in Purcellville, its elevation is 513 feet (156 m) above sea level.

== Trail features ==
Feature	Jurisdiction	Distance from Trailhead	Trail Elevation	Coordinates
Four Mile Run Trail-W&OD Trail Connector	City of Alexandria Arlington County	----	----	38°50′35″N 77°04′52″W
Trailhead	Arlington County	0	72 feet (22 m)	38°50′39″N 77°05′09″W
Crossing of Columbia Pike (VA 244)	Arlington County	1.6 miles (2.6 km)	131 feet (40 m)	38°51′23″N 77°06′35″W
Overlook of Sparrow Pond wetland	Arlington County	2.0 miles (3.2 km)	91 feet (28 m)	38°51′43″N 77°06′56″W
Arlington Boulevard (U.S. Route 50) bridge over trail and Four Mile Run	Arlington County	2.7 miles (4.3 km)	190 feet (58 m)	38°51′59″N 77°07′26″W
Carlin Springs Road bridge over trail and Four Mile Run	Arlington County	3.0 miles (4.8 km)	196 feet (60 m)	38°52′04″N 77°07′40″W
Intersection with Bluemont Junction Trail	Arlington County	3.3 miles (5.3 km)	231 feet (70 m)	38°52′19″N 77°07′56″W
Bluemont Junction Railroad Display and Caboose	Arlington County	3.4 miles (5.5 km)	231 feet (70 m)	38°52′23″N 77°07′57″W
Wilson Boulevard bridge over trail and Four Mile Run	Arlington County	3.5 miles (5.6 km)	216 feet (66 m)	38°52′30″N 77°08′01″W
Intersection with Custis Trail	Arlington County	3.9 miles (6.3 km)	225 feet (69 m)	38°52′45″N 77°08′20″W
Brandymore Castle (rock outcrop)	Arlington County	4.8 miles (7.7 km)	270 feet (82 m)	38°53′02″N 77°09′12″W
N. Sycamore Street (near East Falls Church Metro Station)	Arlington County	5.0 miles (8.0 km)	270 feet (82 m)	38°53′10″N 77°09′25″W
Trail bridge over Lee Highway (U.S. 29)	Arlington County	5.6 miles (9.0 km)	292 feet (89 m)	38°53′14″N 77°09′45″W
Former site of Falls Church W&OD Railroad station	Arlington County	5.6 miles (9.0 km)	292 feet (89 m)	38°53′14″N 77°09′45″W
Coal trestle remnant	Arlington County	5.6 miles (9.0 km)	306 feet (93 m)	38°53′15″N 77°09′48″W
Crossing of Little Falls Road	Arlington County	5.9 miles (9.5 km)	277 feet (84 m)	38°53′18″N 77°09′57″W
W&OD Railroad station mile marker post	City of Falls Church	5.9 miles (9.5 km)	285 feet (87 m)	38°53′18″N 77°09′59″W
Former site of West Falls Church W&OD Railroad station	City of Falls Church	6.9 miles (11.1 km)	344 feet (105 m)	38°53′30″N 77°11′07″W
Trail bridge over West Broad Street (VA 7)	City of Falls Church	7.0 miles (11.3 km)	374 feet (114 m)	38°53′30″N 77°11′09″W
Trail and Virginia Lane bridge over I-66 and Washington Metro	Fairfax County	8.4 miles (13.5 km)	489 feet (149 m)	38°53′28″N 77°12′38″W
Trail bridge over I-495 (Capital Beltway)	Fairfax County	8.8 miles (14.2 km)	430 feet (130 m)	38°53′26″N 77°13′04″W
Crossing of Sandburg Street, Dunn Loring	Fairfax County	9.1 miles (14.6 km)	392 feet (119 m)	38°53′30″N 77°13′20″W
Crossing of Gallows Road (VA 650)	Fairfax County	9.3 miles (15.0 km)	429 feet (131 m)	38°53′32″N 77°13′30″W
Arlington & Fairfax Railway bridge abutments	Town of Vienna	10.4 miles (16.7 km)	491 feet (150 m)	38°54′00″N 77°14′45″W
Crossing of Maple Avenue E (VA 123)	Town of Vienna	11.5 miles (18.5 km)	375 feet (114 m)	38°54′09″N 77°15′50″W
Freeman Store and Museum (Church Street NE)	Town of Vienna	11.6 miles (18.7 km)	364 feet (111 m)	38°54′12″N 77°15′54″W
Railroad whistle post in Vienna Centennial Park	Town of Vienna	11.7 miles (18.8 km)	360 feet (110 m)	38°54′12″N 77°15′56″W
Vienna Caboose Museum in Vienna Centennial Park	Town of Vienna	11.7 miles (18.8 km)	360 feet (110 m)	38°54′13″N 77°15′57″W
Vienna W&OD Railroad Station and model railroad	Town of Vienna	11.8 miles (19.0 km)	360 feet (110 m)	38°54′15″N 77°16′01″W
Eudora Park	Fairfax County	12.5 miles (20.1 km)	309 feet (94 m)	38°54′49″N 77°16′39″W
Clarks Crossing Road and Park	Fairfax County	13.2 miles (21.2 km)	285 feet (87 m)	38°55′15″N 77°17′09″W
Trail bridge over Piney Branch	Fairfax County	13.6 miles (21.9 km)	281 feet (86 m)	38°55′32″N 77°17′18″W
Trail bridge over Difficult Run	Fairfax County	14.3 miles (23.0 km)	252 feet (77 m)	38°55′51″N 77°17′54″W
Crossing of Hunter Mill Road (VA 674)	Fairfax County	14.7 miles (23.7 km)	252 feet (77 m)	38°55′58″N 77°18′18″W
Crossing of Sunrise Valley Drive (VA 5320)	Fairfax County	15.8 miles (25.4 km)	343 feet (105 m)	38°56′31″N 77°19′18″W
Dulles Access Road and Dulles Toll Road (VA 267) bridges over trail	Fairfax County	16.1 miles (25.9 km)	394 feet (120 m)	38°56′41″N 77°19′32″W
Crossing of Wiehle Avenue (near Wiehle-Reston East Metro Station)	Fairfax County	16.8 miles (27.0 km)	393 feet (120 m)	38°57′02″N 77°20′09″W
Sunset Hills W&OD Railroad Station, Reston	Fairfax County	17.7 miles (28.5 km)	413 feet (126 m)	38°57′21″N 77°21′06″W
Northbound Reston Parkway (VA 602) bridge over trail	Fairfax County	17.9 miles (28.8 km)	442 feet (135 m)	38°57′25″N 77°21′17″W
Intersection with trail to Reston Town Center	Fairfax County	18.2 miles (29.3 km)	408 feet (124 m)	38°57′23″N 77°21′41″W
Intersection with trail to Fairfax County Parkway Trail	Fairfax County	18.3 miles (29.5 km)	390 feet (120 m)	38°57′28″N 77°22′06″W
Sugarland Run culvert	Town of Herndon	18.8 miles (30.3 km)	384 feet (117 m)	38°57′35″N 77°22′16″W
Intersection with Sugarland Run Valley Stream Trail	Town of Herndon	18.9 miles (30.4 km)	384 feet (117 m)	38°57′37″N 77°22′18″W
Herndon Depot Museum	Town of Herndon	19.9 miles (32.0 km)	396 feet (121 m)	38°58′13″N 77°23′09″W
Herndon Caboose	Town of Herndon	20.0 miles (32.2 km)	393 feet (120 m)	38°58′15″N 77°23′10″W
Fairfax County-Loudoun County boundary	--------	21.2 miles (34.1 km)	357 feet (109 m)	38°58′58″N 77°24′09″W
Crossing of S. Sterling Boulevard (VA 846)	Loudoun County	22.4 miles (36.0 km)	346 feet (105 m)	38°59′37″N 77°25′04″W
West Church Road (VA 625) bridge over trail, Sterling	Loudoun County	23.3 miles (37.5 km)	306 feet (93 m)	39°00′19″N 77°25′40″W
Ruritan Circle (Old Church Road) (VA 859), Sterling (tracks near trail)	Loudoun County	23.4 miles (37.7 km)	316 feet (96 m)	39°00′22″N 77°25′42″W
Trail bridge over Sully Road (VA 28) (viewpoint)	Loudoun County	23.9 miles (38.5 km)	346 feet (105 m)	39°00′41″N 77°26′00″W
Trail bridge over Broad Run	Loudoun County	24.7 miles (39.8 km)	251 feet (77 m)	39°01′06″N 77°26′42″W
Trail bridge over Loudoun County Parkway (VA 607)	Loudoun County	24.8 miles (39.9 km)	275 feet (84 m)	39°01′13″N 77°26′52″W
W&OD Regional Park Headquarters, Ashburn	Loudoun County	25.7 miles (41.4 km)	258 feet (79 m)	39°01′38″N 77°27′39″W
Smiths Switch Station rest stop, Ashburn	Loudoun County	25.7 miles (41.4 km)	258 feet (79 m)	39°01′39″N 77°27′37″W
Trail bridge over Beaverdam Run	Loudoun County	26.2 miles (42.2 km)	237 feet (72 m)	39°01′55″N 77°28′02″W
Crossing of Ashburn Road (VA 641)	Loudoun County	27.5 miles (44.3 km)	281 feet (86 m)	39°02′38″N 77°29′15″W
Trail bridge over Claiborne Parkway (VA 901)	Loudoun Parkway	28.6 miles (46.0 km)	325 feet (99 m)	39°03′11″N 77°30′10″W
Crossing of Belmont Ridge Road (VA 659)	Loudoun County	29.5 miles (47.5 km)	310 feet (94 m)	39°03′49″N 77°30′40″W
Overlook of Luck Stone Quarry	Loudoun County	29.7 miles (47.8 km)	304 feet (93 m)	39°04′02″N 77°31′03″W
Trail bridge over Goose Creek	Loudoun County	30.1 miles (48.4 km)	263 feet (80 m)	39°04′10″N 77°31′10″W
Entrance to Two Creeks Trail Area	Loudoun County	30.2 miles (48.6 km)	262 feet (80 m)	39°04′14″N 77°31′14″W
Trail bridge over Sycolin Creek	Loudoun County	30.4 miles (48.9 km)	256 feet (78 m)	39°04′20″N 77°31′29″W
Crossing of Cochrane Mill Road (VA 653)	Loudoun County	30.7 miles (49.4 km)	272 feet (83 m)	39°04′26″N 77°31′42″W
Pleasant View Substation of Dominion Energy	Loudoun County	30.8 miles (49.6 km)	275 feet (84 m)	39°04′33″N 77°31′43″W
Crosstrail Boulevard bridge over trail	Loudoun County	31.2 miles (50.2 km)	295 feet (90 m)	39°04′46″N 77°31′54″W
Trail bridge over Tuscarora Creek	Town of Leesburg	32.4 miles (52.1 km)	315 feet (96 m)	39°05′44″N 77°32′32″W
VA 7/U.S. 15 bridges over trail	Town of Leesburg	33.0 miles (53.1 km)	294 feet (90 m)	39°06′01″N 77°32′59″W
19th century lime kiln	Town of Leesburg	34.1 miles (54.9 km)	339 feet (103 m)	39°06′35″N 77°33′40″W
Crossing of Harrison Street SE	Town of Leesburg	34.3 miles (55.2 km)	326 feet (99 m)	39°06′37″N 77°33′48″W
Crossing of S. King Street (U.S. 15 (Business))	Town of Leesburg	34.4 miles (55.4 km)	320 feet (98 m)	39°06′43″N 77°33′58″W
Trail bridge over VA 7	Town of Leesburg	35.5 miles (57.1 km)	433 feet (132 m)	39°06′37″N 77°35′16″W
Crossing of Dry Mill Road (VA 699)	Loudoun County	38.0 miles (61.2 km)	582 feet (177 m)	39°08′16″N 77°36′34″W
Stone arch over trail at Clarke's Gap	Loudoun County	38.2 miles (61.5 km)	579 feet (176 m)	39°08′22″N 77°36′39″W
Trail and VA 9 (Charles Town Pike) bridge over VA 7 at Clarke's Gap (trail high point)	Loudoun County	38.4 miles (61.8 km)	606 feet (185 m)	39°08′27″N 77°36′45″W
Clarks Gap passenger shelter (relocated), Paeonian Springs	Loudoun County	39.2 miles (63.1 km)	555 feet (169 m)	39°08′52″N 77°37′10″W
Hamilton W&OD Railroad Station	Loudoun County	40.9 miles (65.8 km)	443 feet (135 m)	39°08′39″N 77°39′05″W
Crossing of Berlin Turnpike (VA 287)	Loudoun County	43.0 miles (69.2 km)	519 feet (158 m)	39°08′44″N 77°41′29″W
VA 7 bridges over trail and Berlin Turnpike (VA 287)	Loudoun County	43.1 miles (69.4 km)	519 feet (158 m)	39°08′40″N 77°41′30″W
Crossing of N. Maple Avenue (VA 722)	Town of Purcellville	43.8 miles (70.5 km)	503 feet (153 m)	39°08′31″N 77°42′03″W
Crossing of Hatcher Avenue (VA 611)	Town of Purcellville	44.4 miles (71.5 km)	516 feet (157 m)	39°08′18″N 77°42′47″W
Purcellville Train Station (N. 21st Street)	Town of Purcellville	44.6 miles (71.8 km)	513 feet (156 m)	39°08′18″N 77°42′58″W
End of trail	Town of Purcellville	44.6 miles (71.8 km)	513 feet (156 m)	39°08′19″N 77°42′59″W

== History ==
When the W&OD Railroad closed in 1968, its 100 feet (30.5 m) wide right-of-way extended from Potomac Yard in Alexandria to the center of Purcellville. In October 1968, the Virginia State Highway Department started condemnation proceedings to acquire the right-of-way, which was eventually donated to the state, where it crossed Shirley Highway. The section where it crossed the future Interstate 66 was also donated. In the same year that the railroad closed, the land that lay west of the Alexandria/Arlington boundary was sold for $4.91 million to Virginia Electric and Power Company (VEPCO) (part of which was incorporated into Dominion Energy in 2000) for power line right-of-way. Also in 1968, the Town of Vienna rejected a proposal to ask the State Highway Commission to add the railroad ROW to the urban road system for Northern Virginia and instead sought to purchase the ROW and include part of it in the new Northside Park. In 1969, Vienna asked VEPCO to give them the ROW through town.

In 1971, voters in Fairfax County approved a $35 million park bond referendum that was to be used in part to buy the W&OD right of way in the county and buy another 590 acres of land along the route for campgrounds and picnic areas (but due to slow negotiations with VEPCO, that money was spent elsewhere). In 1972, voters approved the construction of a trail, then called "The Virginia Creeper," along the right-of way.

In 1973 a study of the right-of-way proposed using it for a linear park.

=== Trail construction and extension ===
The first portion of the W&OD Trail opened in 1974 within the City of Falls Church under a lease agreement between the City government, the power company VEPCO and the NVRPA. It extended from Little Falls Street to Railroad Avenue. By late 1976 a second, 1-mile long section opened in Vienna - again with permission from VEPCO. As the 1.5 miles (2.4 km) trails proved to be popular, the NVRPA and Fairfax County proposed building a 7.5 mile long trail to connect them as part of a Bicentennial project but VEPCO refused to give the land away, lease it for a $1 a year or sell it in pieces; instead it wanted sell the whole piece of property at once.

After the state legislature passed a unanimous resolution in favor of the trail, and promised oversight of VEPCO, the impasse was overcome. VEPCO agreed to sell the entire right-of-way to NVRPA on December 19, 1977 for $3.6 million, allowing regular purchases of it between 1978 and 1982; and Fairfax County voters passed another $51.1 million bond referendum that included money to pay for it. The power company retained an easement that permitted the company to maintain its lines and to extend them along the right-of-way if needed.

The NVRPA was not able to acquire from the power company the portion of the right-of-way that lay within the City of Alexandria. The NVRPA also could not acquire the portion of right-of-way that the highway department had retained for construction of I-66 near East Falls Church in Arlington and various portions of the right-of-way that contained existing or potential highway crossings.

The NVRPA extended the trail east and west of Falls Church as it acquired portions of the right-of-way until it stretched from Alexandria to Purcellville. In 1979, the trail was extended 26 miles (42 km) westward from Falls Church to Goose Creek with the aid of a federal Rails-to-Trails grant, although it was only paved as far as Maple Avenue East (VA Route 123) in Vienna - a distance of 6 miles (10 km); and by 1979 Fairfax County had built Buckthorn Lane on a raised area across the right-of-way, forcing the trail to leave the ROW and climb up to the road. Beyond that it was only suitable for hiking.

In 1981, the NVRPA paved the trail from Vienna to Herndon. During the same year, the NVRPA also converted a section 12 miles (19 km) long from Herndon to Leesburg from a hiking trail to a gravel path.

In 1982, the NVRPA completed a trail underpass at U.S. 15 (Leesburg Bypass) east of Leesburg, increasing the trail's total distance to over 30 miles (48 km). The trail's route west of Leesburg remained accessible only by foot.

Also in 1982, the trail was extended and paved eastward from Little Falls Street in Falls Church to Patrick Henry Drive in Arlington as part of the construction of I-66. During that same time period, the NVRPA began paving the easternmost section of trail from Shirlington Road to Columbia Pike (VA 244) in Arlington, with that work completed by the end of 1983.

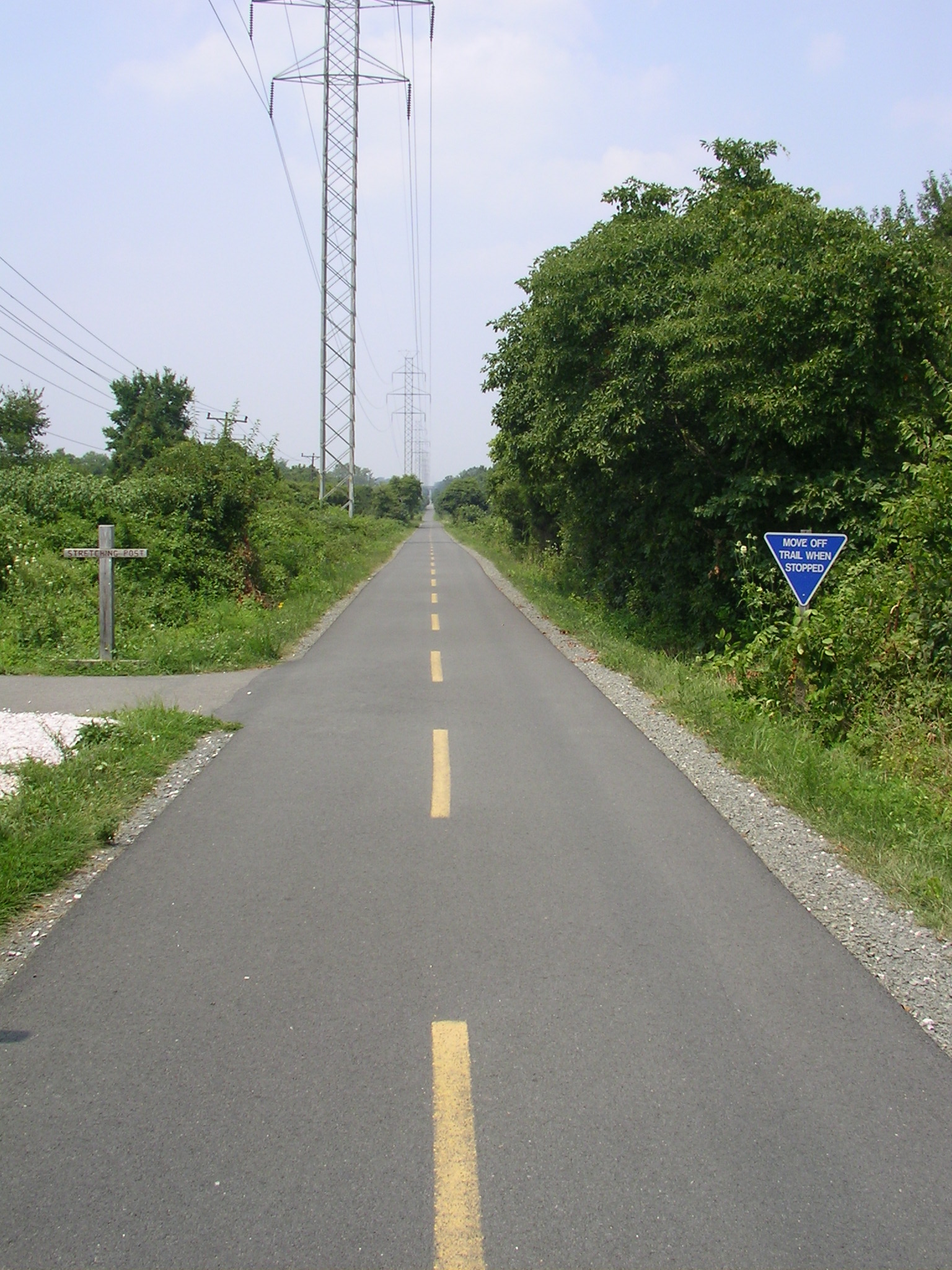
W&OD Trail near Ashburn at entrance to rest stop west of Smith Switch Road in August 2006, looking northwest

In September 1984, the NVRPA finished paving two sections of the trail, an extension westward from Herndon to Sterling and, two weeks later, an extension east from I-66 to Columbia Pike. Prior to the 1984 completion, the Arlington section of the trail from Columbia Pike to Lee Highway had been a dirt and gravel path. A sewer construction project that traveled along Four Mile Run delayed the paving for years.

In 1985, the NVRPA extended the paved portion of the trail through Leesburg, together with a parallel bridle path that NVRPA extended to Purcellville. The paved trail reached its western terminus in Purcellville in 1988.

In 2002, the NVRPA constructed the final section of the trail in and near Arlington County's Bluemont Park. Construction was delayed for years due to opposition from the public over the potential environmental impacts of the paved section. When completed, the final section connected the W&OD Trail's intersection with the Bluemont Junction Trail to the section of the W&OD Trail that is just east of North Carlin Springs Road. The final section included a new trail bridge over Four Mile Run and an underpass below North Carlin Springs Road.

On October 20, 2007, construction began for a paved trail that would connect the W&OD Trail at its origin with the Four Mile Run Trail by traveling for 3,000 feet (914 m) along a bank of the Run while passing beneath the Henry G. Shirley Memorial Highway (I-395) in Alexandria and West Glebe Road in Arlington. On May 30, 2009, a ribbon-cutting ceremony heralded the completion and opening of the connecting trail.

=== Spot changes ===
After constructing most of the trail, the NVRPA focused on grade-separating the trail and making other spot changes, sometimes in collaboration with the Virginia Department of Transportation (VDOT) or with developers of nearby properties. In 1989, the VDOT completed the Herndon Parkway on the east side of Herndon, which included a trail bridge over the Parkway. In 1990, a trail bridge was constructed over VA 28 in eastern Loudoun County as part of a project to widen that road.

In 1991, the trail crossing of Reston Parkway (VA 602) in Reston was moved from Sunset Hills Road (VA 675) to Bluemont Way. On October 3, 1993, the NVRPA completed a bridge over West Broad Street (VA 7) in Falls Church.

In 1999, a developer, Terrabrook Communities, built a 55 ft (16.8 m) wide and 15 ft (4.6 m) high arched-concrete trail underpass beneath Reston Parkway as part of an agreement with the NVRPA. The 500 ft (152.4 m) of old trail in that section became connectors to the parkway at Bluemont Way. The western section of the Herndon Parkway, with another trail bridge over it, was completed in 1997. In 2001, the VDOT expanded the Fairfax County Parkway (VA 286) across the W&OD Trail right-of-way, building an overpass for the trail at about the same time.

In 2005, the Sugarland Run Valley Stream Trail in Herndon was extended 1 mi (1.6 km) to connect to the trail. In May 2006, the VDOT completed work on an extension of Claiborne Parkway (VA 901) that crossed NOVA Parks' right-of-way. As part of the project, the VDOT constructed a bridge that carried the W&OD Trail over the extended Parkway.

On June 15, 2011, VDOT opened a new trail bridge over I-495 that was constructed as part of the Capital Beltway High Occupancy Toll (HOT) Lanes project. The new bridge was both 4 ft (1.2 m) wider and 30 ft (9.1 m) higher than the one built in 1979. In 2013-2015, an Arlington County streetscape and utilities project realigned the W&OD's Trail's crossing of Columbia Pike (VA 244). An associated Arlington County project constructed a plaza and a bicycle "learner's loop" adjacent to the realigned trail in the County's Glencarlyn Park.

In late 2015, a truck-climbing lane project was completed on VA 7 in Clarke's Gap. The project realigned the trail to move its crossing of Charles Town Pike (VA 9) at Dry Mill Road (VA 699) to a new underpass beneath the Pike on the south side of VA 7. The realigned trail bypassed the trail's former high point, reducing the trail's highest elevation above sea level from 680 feet (207.3 m) to 606 feet (184.7 m).

In 2017, a bridge carrying Belmont Ridge Road (VA 659) over the W&OD Trail and a trail parking lot was constructed in Loudoun County as part of a project to widen the road. Also in 2017, NOVA Parks made within the County a set of safety improvements at the trail's crossing of S. Sterling Boulevard (VA 846), including removing one left turn lane to reduce the trail's crossing distance, installing Rectangular Rapid Flashing Beacons, and widening the Boulevard's median

On March 12, 2021, the VDOT opened a W&OD Trail pedestrian and bicycle bridge over Lee Highway (U.S. 29) in Arlington County's East Falls Church neighborhood as part of its "Transform 66 - Inside the Beltway" I-66 eastbound widening project. When planning the project, the VDOT hosted several public meetings that provided information about the bridge, which had raised concerns among neighborhood residents.

In 2023, a campaign failed to name the bridge for Peter Beers, whom a falling tree had killed in 2020 while he was cycling. Nevertheless, a local online newspaper gave Beers' name to the bridge in 2024 and 2026.

On July 24th, 2024 the Fairfax County Department of Transportation opened a new trail bridge over Wiehle Avenue in Reston. The bridge was recommended in an April 2008 study by the Reston Metrorail Access Group, an advisory committee created in spring 2006 to prepare for the arrival of Metro’s Silver Line. The Wiehle Metro station opened in 2014, but the Fairfax County Board of Supervisors didn’t approve a final design for the bridge crossing until July 2018. Preliminary work relocating utilities started in 2021, and construction started in March 2023.

In 2026 Loudoun County made substantial improvements to 8 intersections which included signage, painting and in cases such as Smith Switch Road or Dry Mill Road, realigning the trail at the intersection.

=== W&OD Dual Trails project ===
Around 2017, NOVA Parks commissioned a feasibility study for a potential widening of the W&OD Trail or for adding a parallel trail to it within Falls Church and Arlington County because of high use at peak times. The study's author recommended that NOVA Parks make plans to construct a 16 feet (4.9 m) or 19 feet (5.8 m) wide trail within the two jurisdictions, while temporarily widening the trail to 11 feet (3.4 m).

In June 2018, NOVA Parks received a $3.2 million grant from the Northern Virginia Transportation Authority that enabled it to expand a 1.2 miles (1.9 km) long W&OD Trail segment within the City of Falls Church. The project converted an 11 feet (3.4 m) wide section of the trail and part of its adjacent green space into a dual paved path containing a 12 feet (3.7 m) wide bicycle trail and an 8 feet (2.4 m) wide pedestrian trail. A 2 feet (0.6 m) wide strip of pavement separated the two routes, creating a 22 feet (6.7 m) wide transportation corridor that doubled the W&OD Trail's width.

The two imperviously-surfaced trails traveled through a 16 acres (6 ha) urban open space that a 2016 Falls Church master plan had called "The City's Greenest Street". The master plan's "Vision Statement" stated that the project would help "Develop the W&OD Park as a Great Street and greenway".

Officials broke ground on the Falls Church "W&OD Dual Trails" project on August 26, 2020. The widened trail formally opened during a ribbon-cutting ceremony on October 7, 2021. The executive director of NOVA Parks, Paul Gilbert, stated during the event: "I envision over the next decade, more and more urban sections of the W&OD Trail will take on this dual trail methodology."

== Designations ==
In 1987, the U. S. Department of the Interior designated the trail as a National Recreation Trail. In 1999, Virginia Department of Historic Resources staff determined that the "Washington and Old Dominion Railroad Historic District" (053-0276) was eligible for listing on the National Register of Historic Places (NRHP). A 2000 NRHP registration form states that the Historic District is eligible for the listing because the District "is associated with events that have made a significant contribution to the broad patterns of our history". The form contains an in-depth description of the District's historical resources and of the railroad's history, as well as maps that show the locations of the Districts's major historical features.

== Historic structures ==
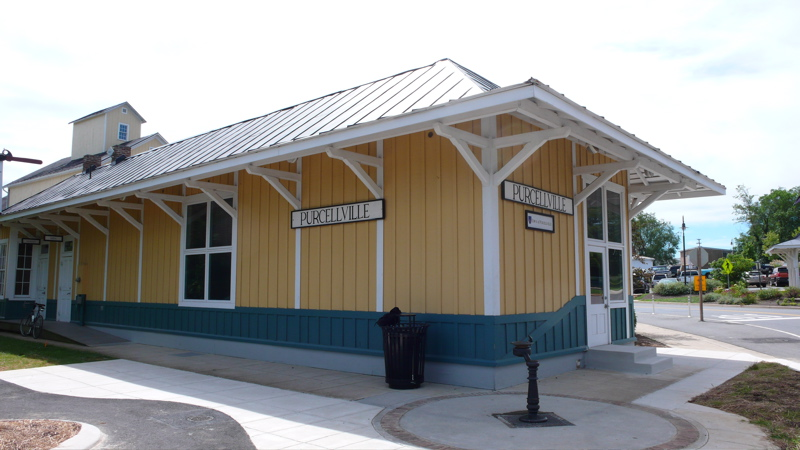
Purcellville Station, August 2008

The park and its immediate surroundings contain a number of historic structures, some of which date to the pre-Civil War period. Most of these structures are railroad remnants, including intact stations at Vienna, Sunset Hills, Herndon, Hamilton and Purcellville, stone arches and culverts, the piers and abutments of bridges, and a relocated passenger shelter (formerly at the site of the Clarks Gap station at the present crossing of the trail and Dry Mill Road (VA 699); now at the former site of the Paeonian Springs station near Simpson Circle).

Part of the reinforced concrete floor of a brick electrical substation that the railroad constructed in 1912 to help supply power to its new electric locomotives and trolley cars is visible in Arlington County's Bluemont Junction Park, south of Wilson Boulevard. The floor is located in the space between a soccer field and a Southern Railway caboose.

A remnant of a coal trestle stands south of the W&OD Trail, near the west end of the trail's bridge over Lee Highway (U.S. 29) in Arlington. In June 2014, the owner of a property adjacent to the regional park demolished part of the structure to provide space for a planned self-storage facility. At the time, the Arlington County government was considering a proposal to designate the structure as a local historic district. In September 2014, the Arlington County Board designated the remaining portion of trestle, which was located on NVRPA property, as a local historic district. The trestle was once adjacent to the west side of the railroad's Falls Church (East Falls Church) station, which was dismantled after the railroad closed.

A white metallic marker post lettered in black with the words "Station 1 Mile" stands on the north side of the trail west of Little Falls Road near the boundary between Arlington and Falls Church. This post, which once stood next to the W&OD Railroad's tracks, is one mile (1.6 km) east of the site of the railroad's demolished West Falls Church Station. The station was located near the east side of the railroad's crossing of W. Broad Street (VA 7) in Falls Church.

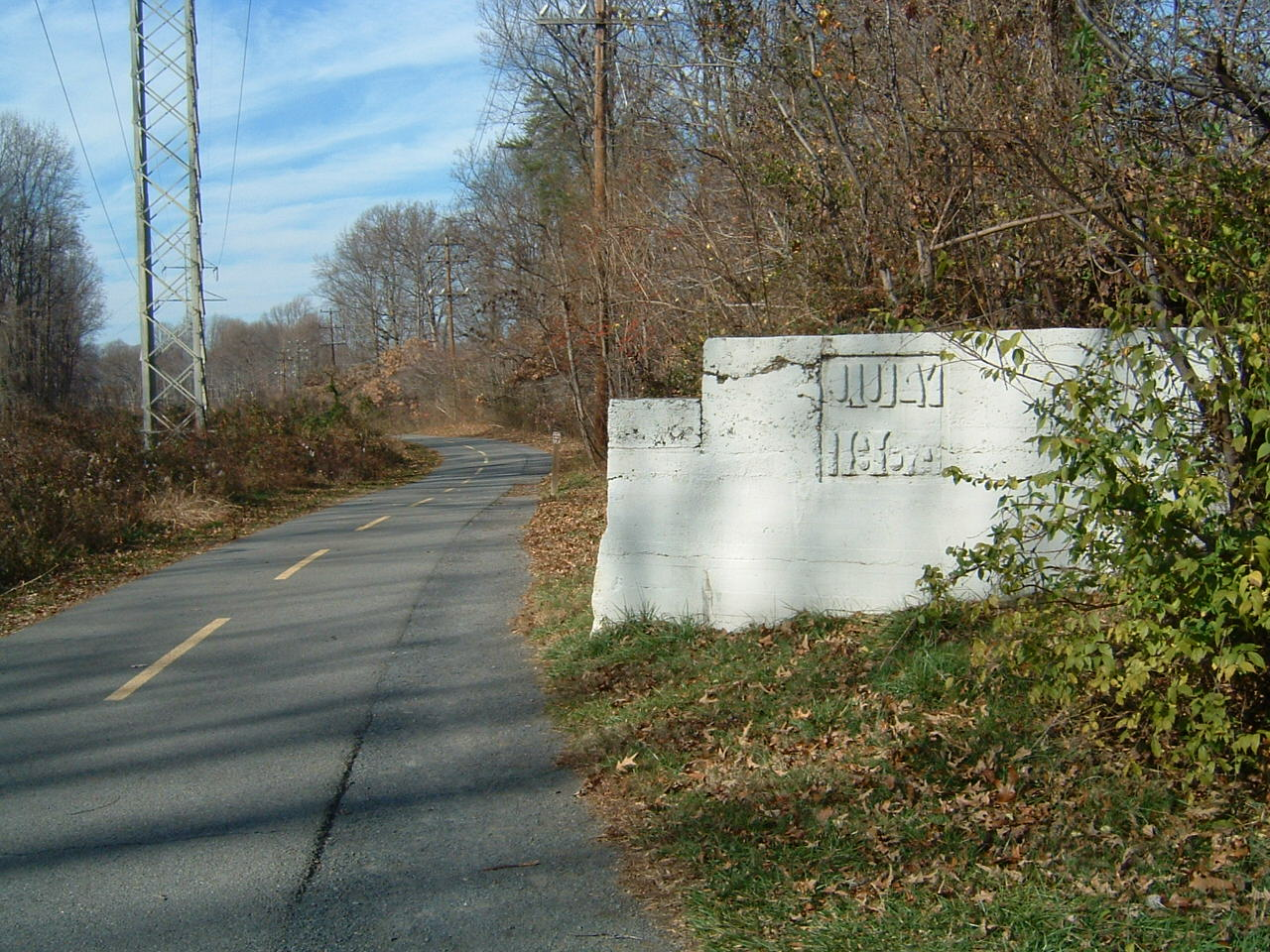
Concrete abutment of the bridge that carried the Arlington & Fairfax Railway over the W&OD Railroad near the east end of Vienna (December 2006)

Near the east end of Vienna, the poured concrete abutment of a bridge that carried an interurban trolley line, the Arlington & Fairfax Railway, over the W&OD Railroad remains on the north side of the trail. An inscription showing the month and year of the abutment's construction (July 1904) is visible on the structure's east side.

Portions of track were visible near the W&OD Trail's crossing of Ruritan Circle (Old Church Road, VA 859) in Sterling during 2023.

The trail crosses Goose Creek in Loudoun County on a span that NVRPA built on top of the piers and abutments of the highest and longest (268 feet (82 m)) bridge that the railroad constructed within the present boundaries of the regional park. Visitors can view these remnants and the intact span, pier and abutments of the railroad's deck girder bridge over Sycolin Creek from unpaved paths that travel between the streams in NVRPA's Two Creeks Trail Area on the north side of the trail.

The Sycolin Creek bridge bears the only remaining span that once carried trains of the W&OD Railroad. As the trail travels on the concrete deck of the bridge, visitors can only see the span and the structures below if they leave the trail.

The piers and abutments of the railroad's bridge over Tuscarora Creek are visible south of the trail near the east end of Leesburg. The bridge was the second longest (149 feet (45 m)) that the railroad built within the present boundaries of the regional park. The piers and abutments are the only ones along the trail's route that do not presently support a bridge.

Remnants of the facilities of a 19th-century lime company are visible in Leesburg on the northeast side of the trail, southeast of Harrison Street SE. Limestone (calcium carbonate) from a company quarry was mixed with coal and burned in a nearby kiln that was adjacent to the railroad's tracks. Quicklime (calcium oxide) was brought out of the kiln through two arched openings that visitors can see from the trail. The company also supplied farmers with agricultural lime and provided builders with lime plaster for walls and stone for roads.

Near the saddle point of Clarks Gap, a stone arch crosses over the trail. Constructed around 1867-1868 soon after the end of the Civil War, the masonry arch once carried the original VA 7 over the railroad's tracks at the railroad's highest point. The arch now carries Dry Mill Road (VA 699) over the trail.

== Displays and museums ==
The Norfolk Southern Railway and its predecessors have donated three cabooses for display along the W&OD Trail. While none of these resemble the cabooses that once travelled along the route of the W&OD Railroad, two of the three cars house exhibits of materials relating to the W&OD Railroad and Trail.

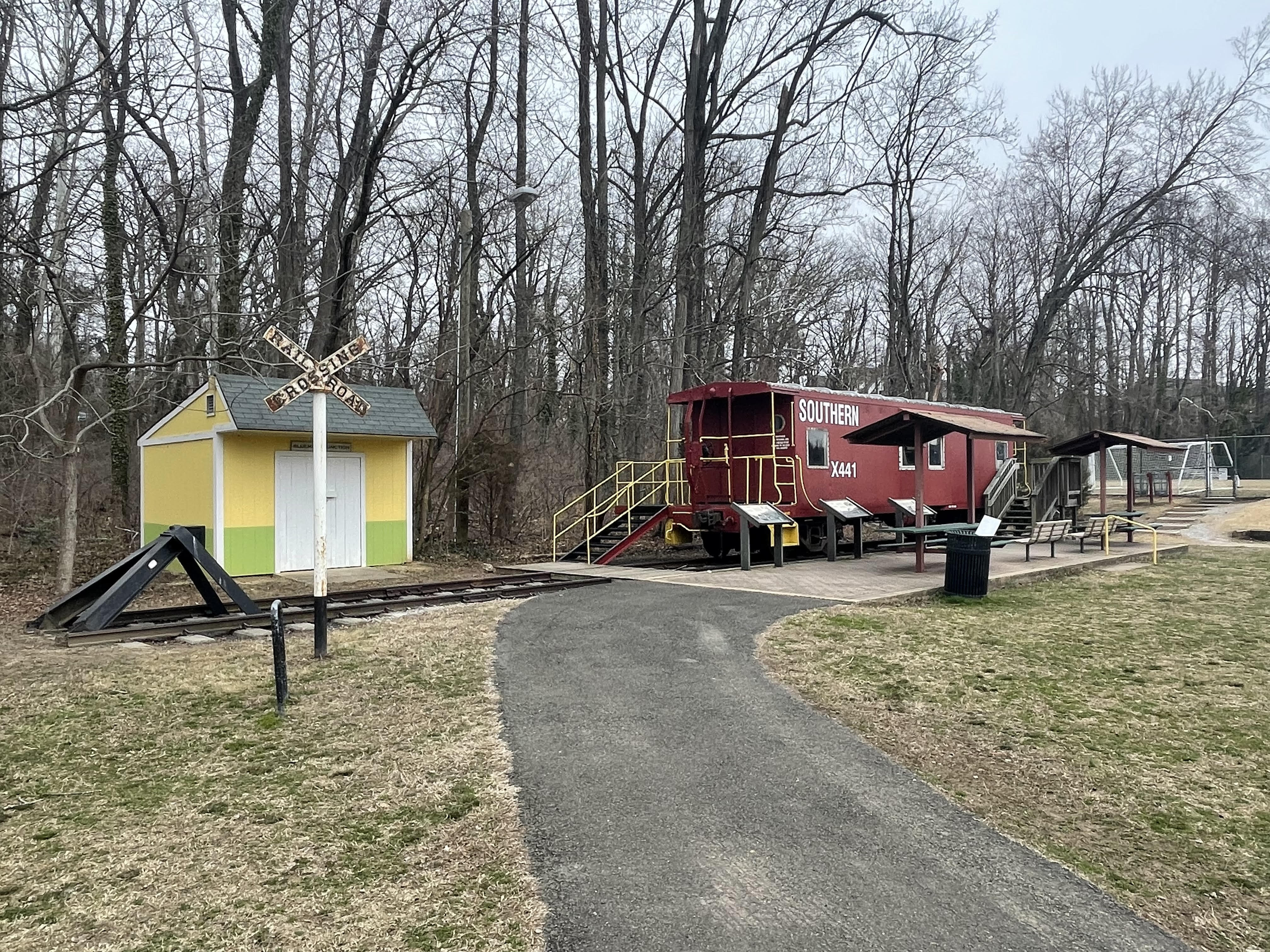
Bluemont Junction Park (February 2024)

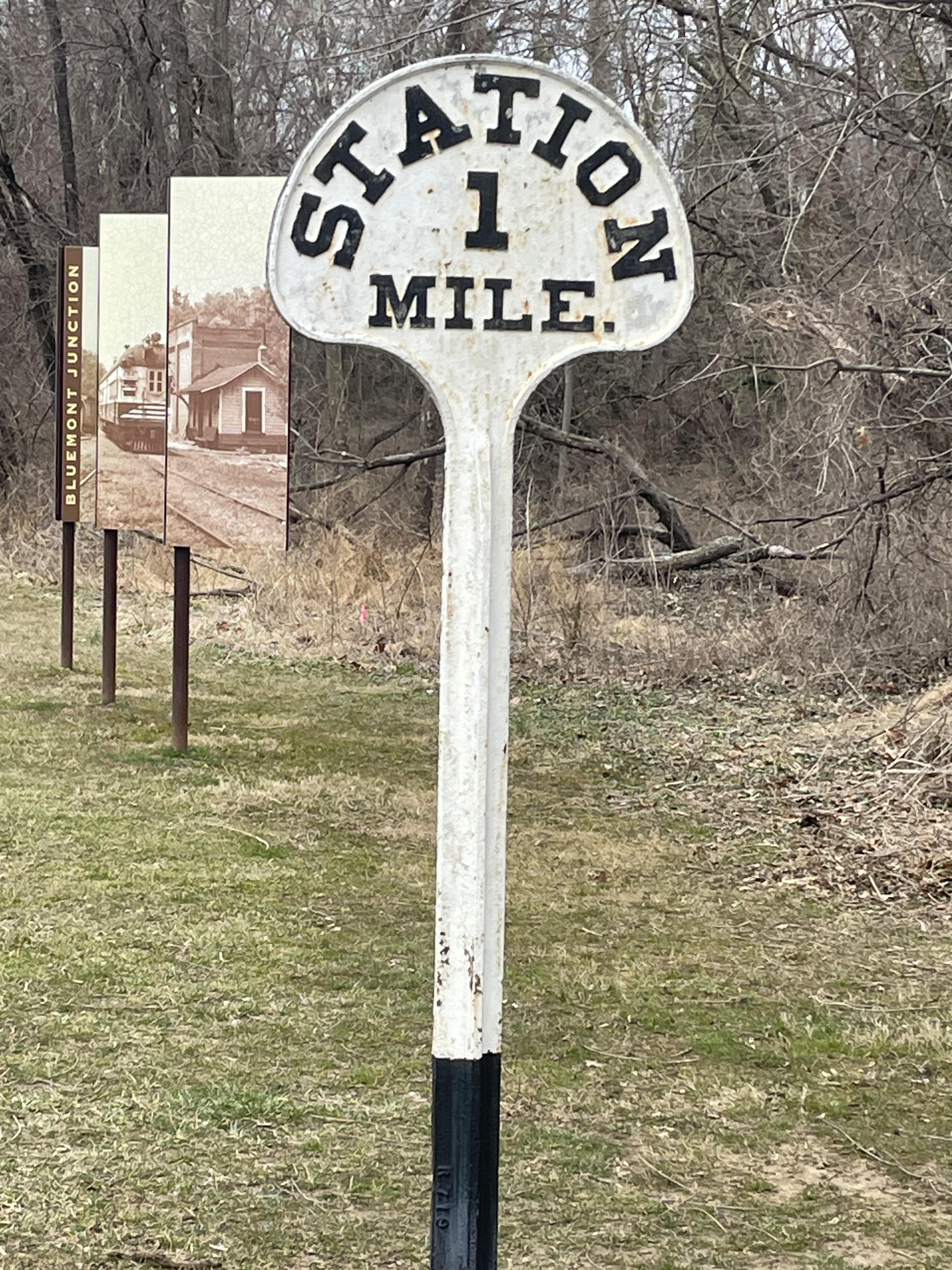
Mile marker sign and railroad photographs in Bluemont Junction Park (February 2024)

A Southern Railway bay window caboose (number X441) within Arlington's Bluemont Junction Park exhibits photographs, maps, and other information related to the County's railroads and trolleys. The caboose was built in 1971, three years after the W&OD Railroad closed. The park contains outdoor signage and photographs that describe and illustrate the history of the W&OD Railroad and of its junction that once operated at the site of the exhibit, as well as a metallic crossbuck and a metallic marker post that was once located 1 mile (1.6 km) from a station.

Adjacent to the Trail in Vienna, the Freeman Store houses a museum of the town's history. The museum contains maps, books and other materials that relate to the W&OD Railroad. Operated by Historic Vienna, Inc., the museum is open to the public during the afternoons of each week from Wednesdays through Sundays.

A cupola caboose near the Trail in Vienna Centennial Park contains a museum that houses materials that the W&OD Railroad once used. Staffed by members of the Optimist Club of Greater Vienna, bearing on its sides the name "WASHINGTON & OLD DOMINION RAILROAD" and numbered 503, the caboose is open to the public during the afternoons on selected weekends and holidays. Near the caboose is a historical marker, an NVRPA information sign, a metallic crossbuck on a wooden post and a metallic marker post that was once located 1 mile (1.6 km) from a station. A metallic white railroad whistle post with black markings is located in Vienna Centennial Park on the north side of the Trail between Church Street NE and the caboose.

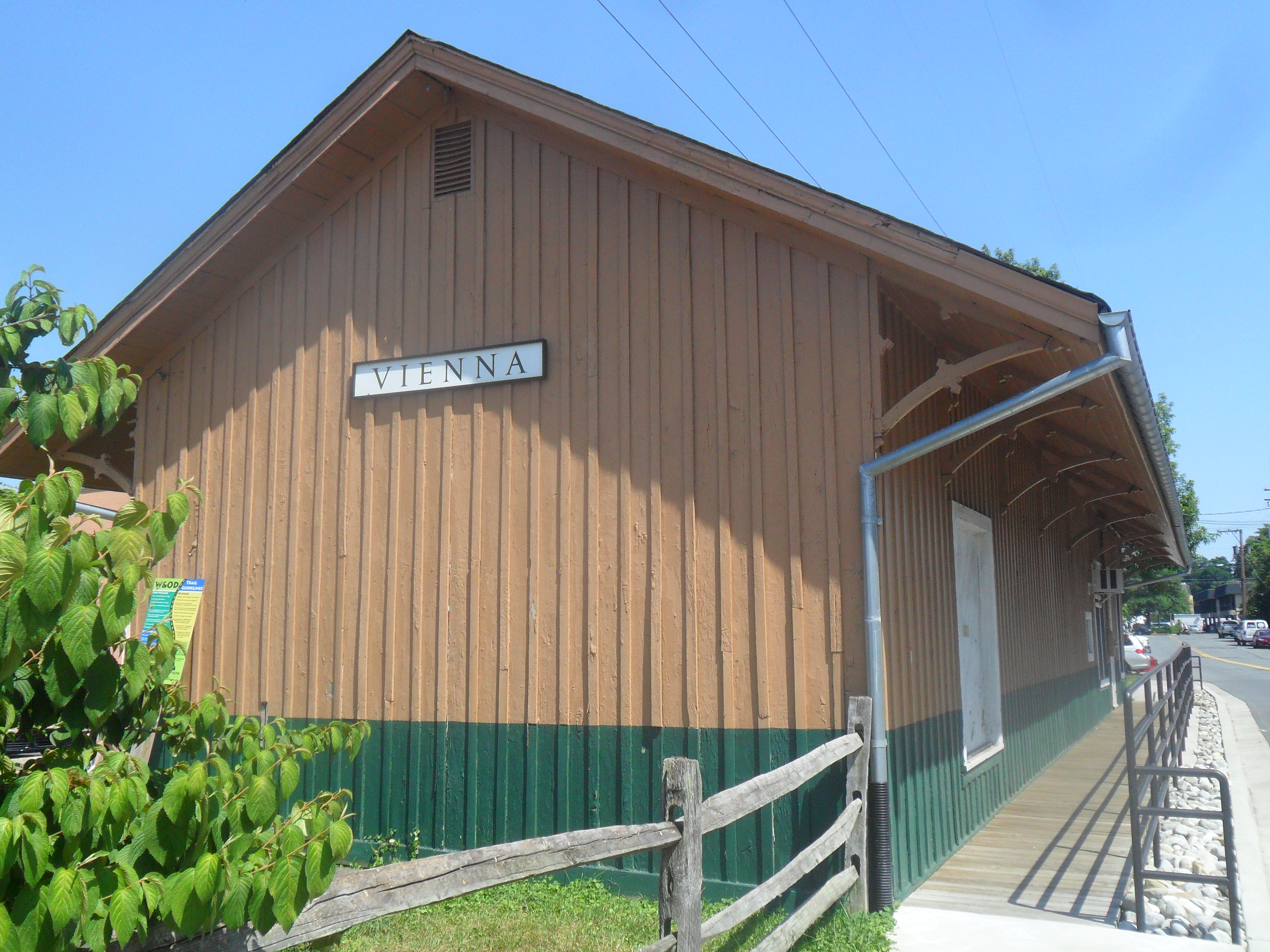
Vienna depot in July 2018

The W&OD Railroad station in Vienna houses a museum and a model railroad layout. Operated by the Northern Virginia Model Railroaders, Inc., the museum displays materials that the W&OD Railroad once used and a model of the station as it appeared when steam locomotives stopped at the station. The model railroad and museum is open to the public during the afternoon of one Saturday of each month except June and August.

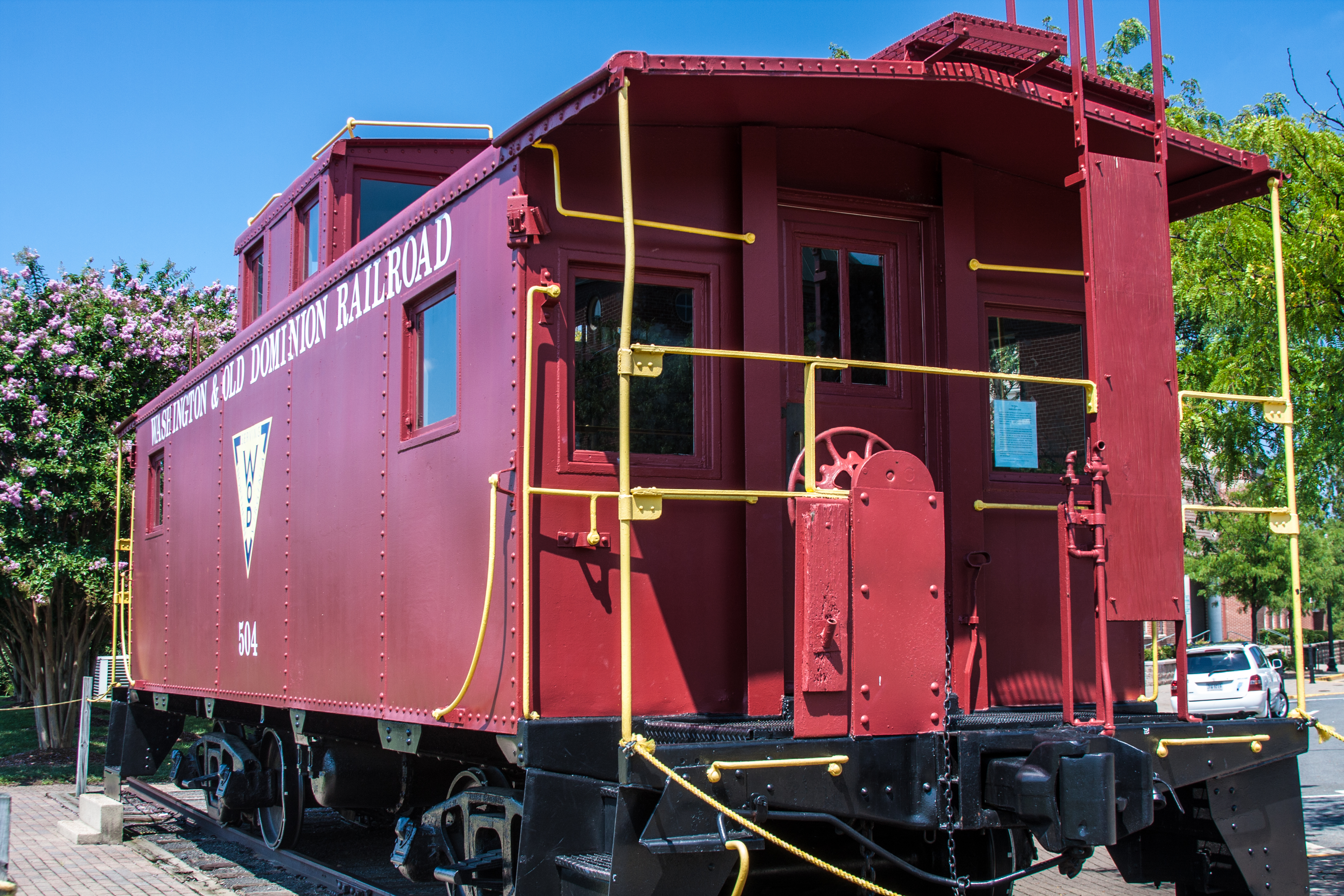
Retired Norfolk & Western Railway caboose repainted and renamed to W&OD 504 after relocating to W&OD Railroad Regional Park near Herndon Depot Museum (August 2012)

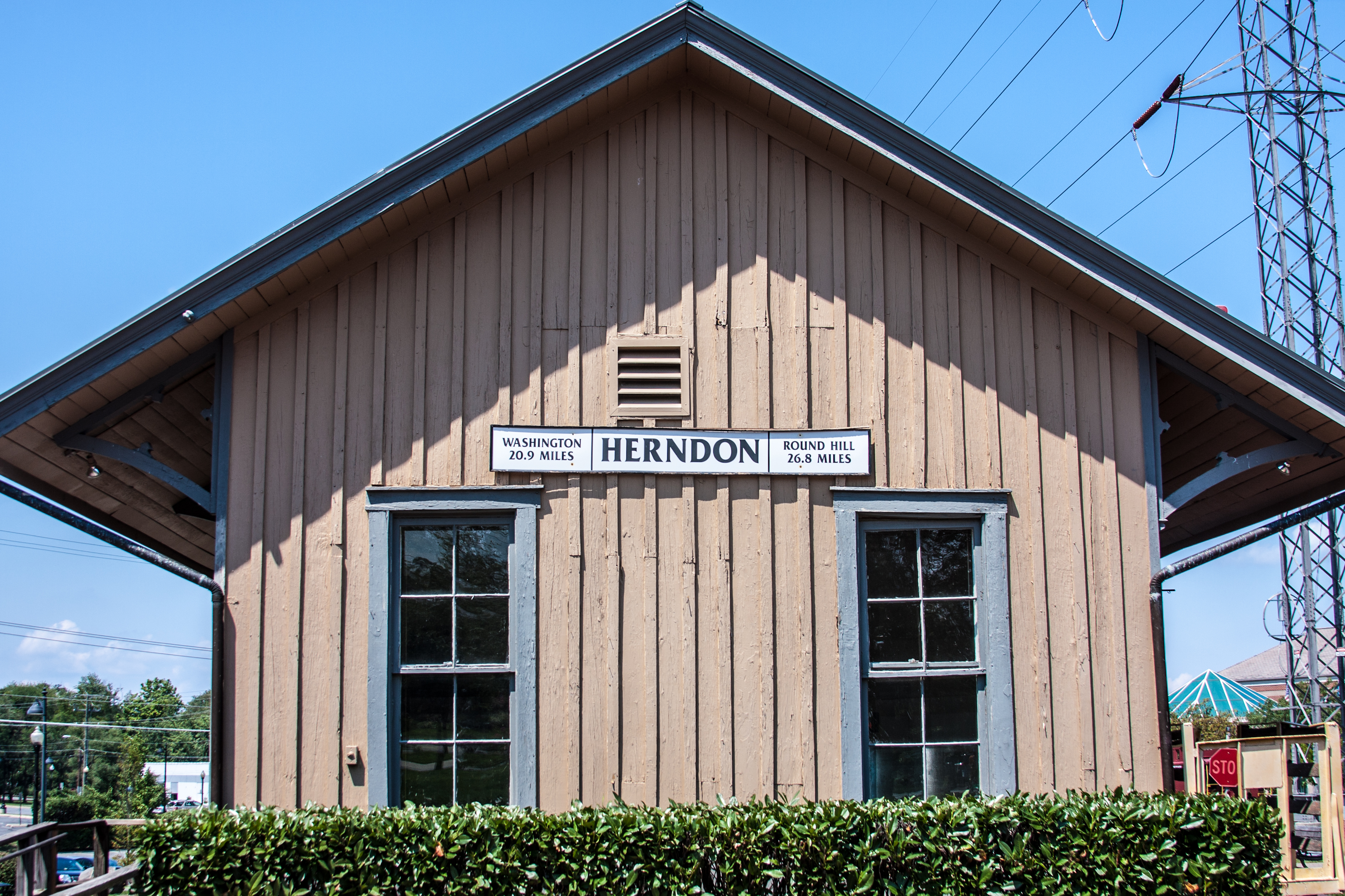
Herndon Depot Museum in August 2012

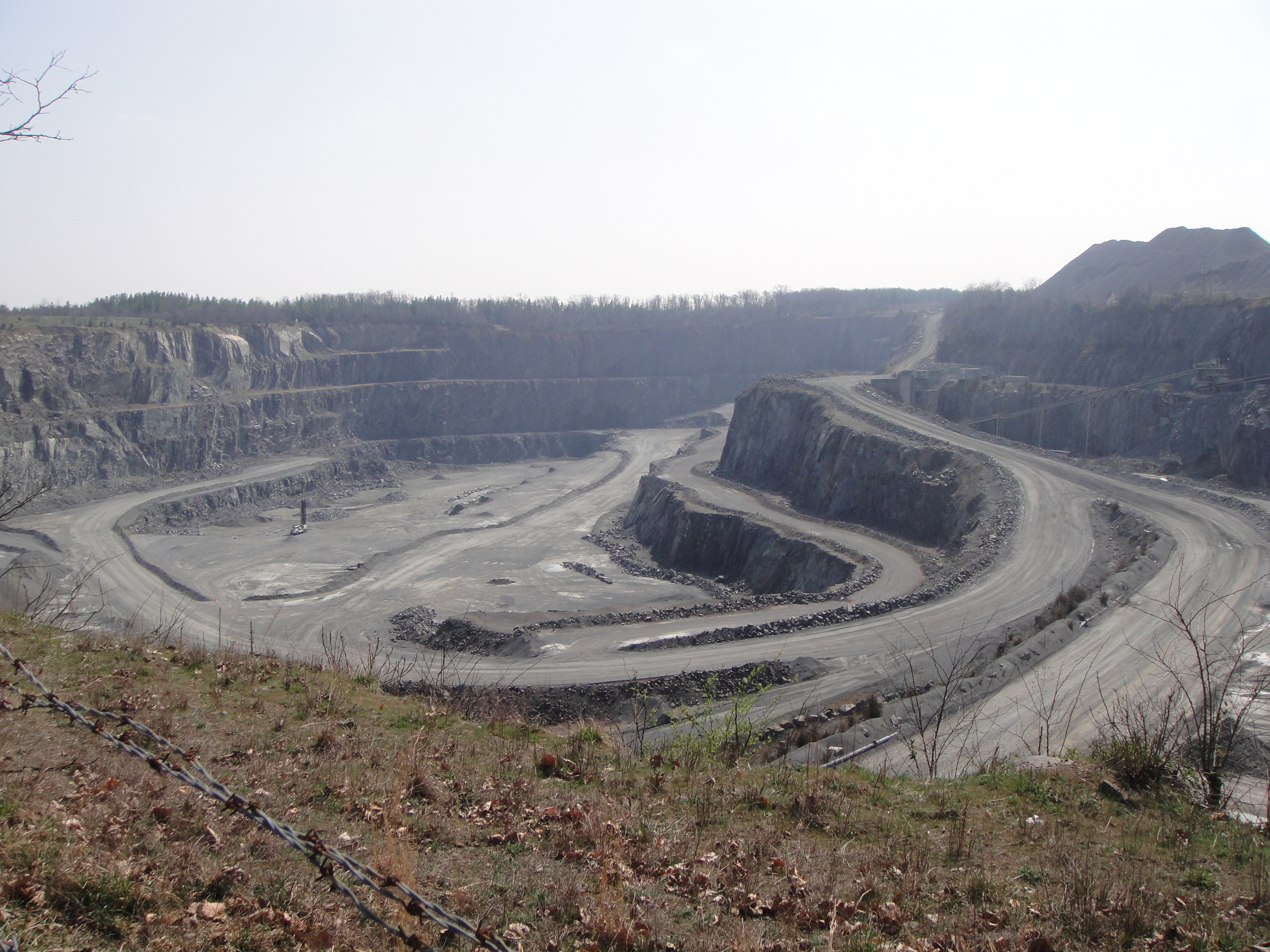
View south from Luck Stone Quarry overlook in March 2012

The W&OD Railroad station in Herndon houses the Herndon Depot Museum, which the Herndon Historical Society operates. The museum, which is open on Sundays from noon to 3:00 p.m. from March to mid-December, displays photographs and newspaper articles relating to the history of the Town of Herndon and the W&OD Railroad.

The museum also contains materials that the railroad once used. The museum additionally contains information about the history of a nearby Norfolk and Western Railway cupola caboose whose sides bore the name and logo of the W&OD Railroad and the number 504 in 2006. A railroad whistle post is located near the caboose.

An overlook at the Luck Stone Quarry east of Goose Creek displays a large trap rock quarry. This mineral provides bulk for concrete, macadam and paving stones.

The W&OD Railroad station in Purcellville houses the Loudoun Visitors Center. The Visitors Center contains a W&OD Railroad historical display and hosts wine-tasting events. The Visitors Center is open from noon to 4:00 p.m. on Saturdays and Sundays from late April through October.

== Natural resources ==
Most of the landscaping in the park is left in a natural state to preserve green space and to provide wildlife habitat. Some natural areas within the park are contiguous to larger natural areas in adjacent public parks, including those in and around the Sparrow Pond wetland, Brandymore Castle and Four Mile Run in Arlington, Piney Branch and Difficult Run in Fairfax County, and the confluence of Goose Creek and Sycolin Creek in Loudoun County.

Park interpreters, local teachers, environmental groups and amateur naturalists use the park as a resource for plant and animal study. These groups have identified approximately 450 species of wildflowers and more than 100 species of birds in the park. Wildlife in the park includes mammals such as foxes, river otters and beavers, and reptiles such as turtles and snakes. A variety of hawks and owls and other resident, non-resident and migratory birds, both upland and aquatic, find habitat in the park.

== Transmission lines ==
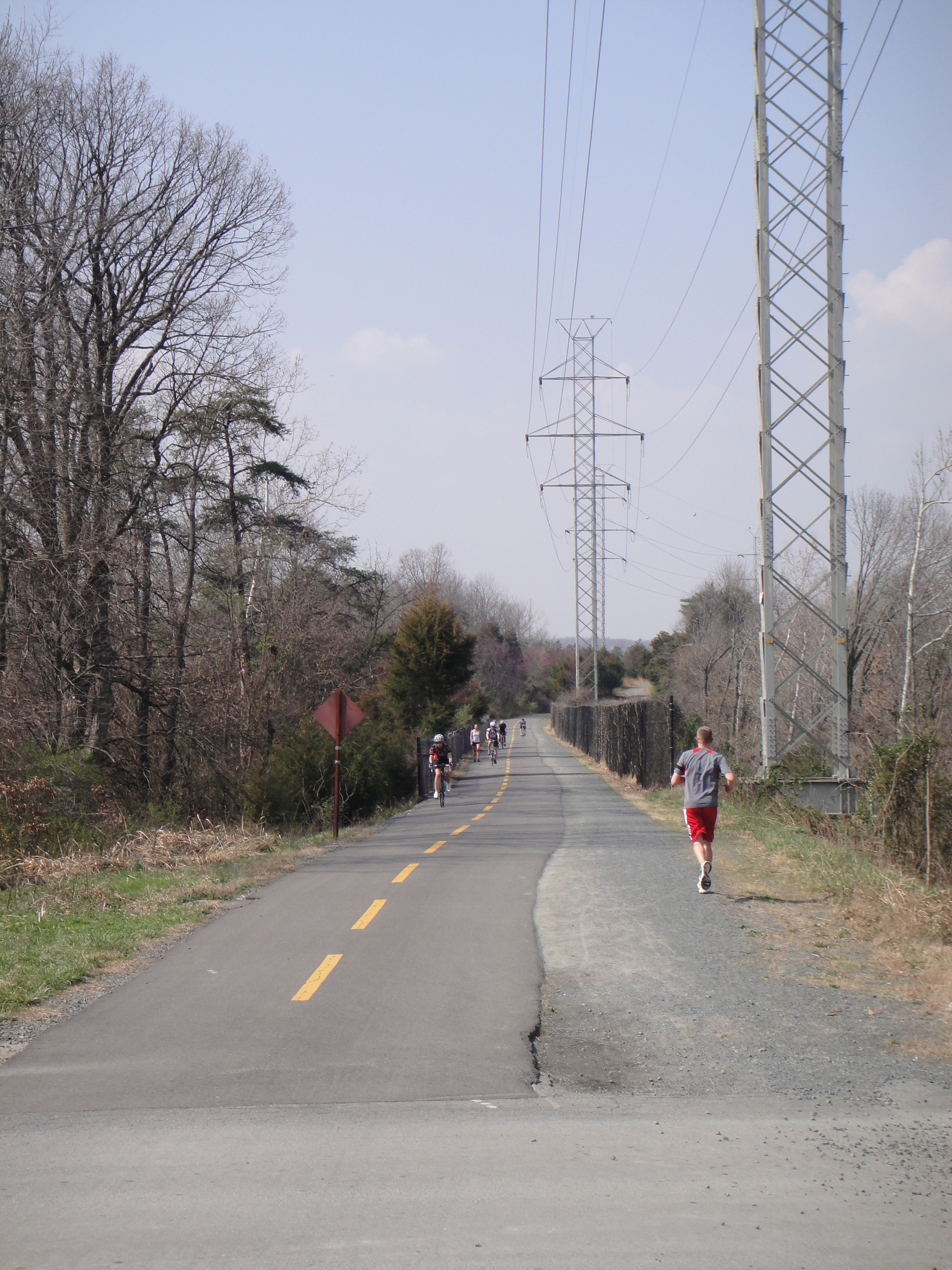
Transmission lines over W&OD Trail in Loudoun County (March 2012)

The W&OD Trail lies beneath a set of electric power transmission lines between its trailhead and the Dominion Energy's Pleasant View Substation in Loudoun County southeast of Leesburg. The power company removes trees along this section of the trail to protect its lines, at times eliciting protests from members of the public and elected officials in the impacted jurisdictions. Trees shade much of the remainder of the trail.

In 2004, Dominion Energy announced plans to extend its transmission lines in Loudoun County above ground from the Pleasant View Substation northwestward along the route of the W&OD Trail. In response, on November 15, 2005, the Loudoun County Board of Supervisors unanimously adopted a resolution of continued opposition to the installation of the proposed transmission lines along the Trail.

Citing the impending loss of trees along its trail, the NVRPA asked the public on December 13, 2005, to oppose Dominion Energy's application for the transmission line project in hearings that the State Corporation Commission (SCC) was planning to conduct as part of its review of the project. During 2005, 2006 and 2007, the NVRPA submitted testimony and briefs to the SCC that opposed the construction of transmission lines along the route of the trail.

In January 2007, an SCC hearing examiner recommended the construction of an overhead transmission line that would follow a wooded segment of the W&OD Trail between Leesburg and Clark's Gap. After the SCC ordered the examiner to consider construction of an underground line along that segment of the trail, the Loudoun County Board of Supervisors unanimously adopted on June 5, 2007, a resolution that supported the location of the line along that segment only if the SCC required Dominion to "install the line underground at a minimum width with the least amount of impact".

The SCC nevertheless approved on February 15, 2008, a transmission line route that would travel above ground for 1.8 miles (2.9 km) along the same segment of the trail. The Commission's approval order stated that the SCC had adopted the Examiner's recommendation against underground construction "due to both the physical, and the cost to the ratepayers, of the impacts that would result therefrom."

Less than three weeks later, on March 4 and 5, 2008, the Senate and the House of Delegates of the Virginia General Assembly unanimously passed emergency legislation that ordered the SCC to approve the underground construction of the line along that segment of the trail as part of a statewide pilot program for the development of such types of transmission lines. Sponsored by Delegate Joe T. May (Republican - Loudoun), the legislation exempted the project from any requirements for further SCC analyses relating to the impacts of the route, including environmental impacts and impacts upon historical resources.

The legislation went into effect when Virginia Governor Tim Kaine approved it on April 2, 2008. Soon afterwards, the power company asked the SCC to approve construction of the underground transmission line in accordance with the terms of the legislation. The SCC approved construction of the underground line on May 28, 2008.

The NVRPA expected the project to result in a significant loss of trees, as the power company planned to dig trenches on each side of the paved trail while installing duct banks to house its conduits. Supporting the NVRPA's expectation, Dominion Energy noted that the environmental impacts associated with underground cable installation in suburban and rural areas are significantly greater than are those of overhead line construction. The W&OD Trail closed for a year in the project area while the power company constructed its underground lines. The trail reopened to the public in November 2010.

In 2024, Dominion Energy backed out of a voluntary agreement to limit tree cuttings to only those directly at risk of tangling with power lines, and began clearcutting trees with potential to grow over 15 feet. This drew condemnation from the boards of Fairfax, Arlington, and Loudoun counties, prompting Dominion Energy to pause the clearings in March 2025.

== Future plans ==
=== Arlington County ===
In July 2020, NOVA Parks received a $650,000 grant from the Northern Virginia Transportation Authority (NVTA) that enabled NOVA Parks to make plans to extend the organization's "Dual Trails" project for 2 mi (3.2 km) eastward from the City of Falls Church into Arlington County (from North Roosevelt Street to North Carlin Springs Road). Although NOVA Parks had asked NVTA for sufficient funds ($5,646,000) to complete the project, the NVTA awarded only the amount that NOVA Parks had requested for design, engineering and environmental work.

The reduced award followed an NVTA public comment period that attracted more than 300 responders. Most comments supported the expansion.

=== Loudoun County ===
There have been plans to extend the trail west to Bluemont and the Appalachian Trail since the 1980s. Loudoun County's 2003 Bicycle and Pedestrian Mobility Master Plan and Virginia's 2013 and 2018 Outdoors Plans recommend such extensions. The right-of-way itself is unavailable to the county and planners have struggled to identify a route or acquire land. Further, construction has occurred on a portion of the former right-of-way that travels through Round Hill.

Because of these difficulties, the Loudoun County government stopped considering such a route. Instead, the County is now constructing a trail that will travel between Purcellville and Round Hill along VA 7 (Business). The first three sections built connect Leesburg Pike (VA 7) to the Lake Point subdivision near the east side of Round Hill. These include an underpass of Leesburg Pike built with the road in the 1990s; the trail north of it built with the Newberry Crossing development ~2008, and the trail south of the Pike built with the Lake Point subdivision ~2016.

The County solicited bids on the next 0.6 miles (1.0 km) shared-use trail between Main Street (VA 719) in Round Hill and Franklin Park west of Purcellville along East Loudoun Street (VA 7 (Business)) in 2019. Construction started on the project in 2020 and reached completion at a ribbon-cutting ceremony on September 27, 2022. It included a sidewalk along Round Hill's Main Street from the former Washington & Old Dominion railroad station to E. Loudoun Street (VA 7 (Business)); a sidewalk on both sides of E. Loudoun Street from the intersection of Main Street to Evening Star Drive where it connected to the previously constructed trail; and a 10-foot wide, shared-use path connecting the Lake Point subdivision to the Franklin Park pool.

The existing portion of the Bluemont-Purcellville trail will connect to another trail, currently under design, that will follow West Main Street (VA 7 (Business)) to connect Franklin Park and downtown Purcellville. County planners estimated in 2025 that the Franklin Park - Purcellville trail would reach substantial completion during the summer of 2030.

=== Proposed transit use ===
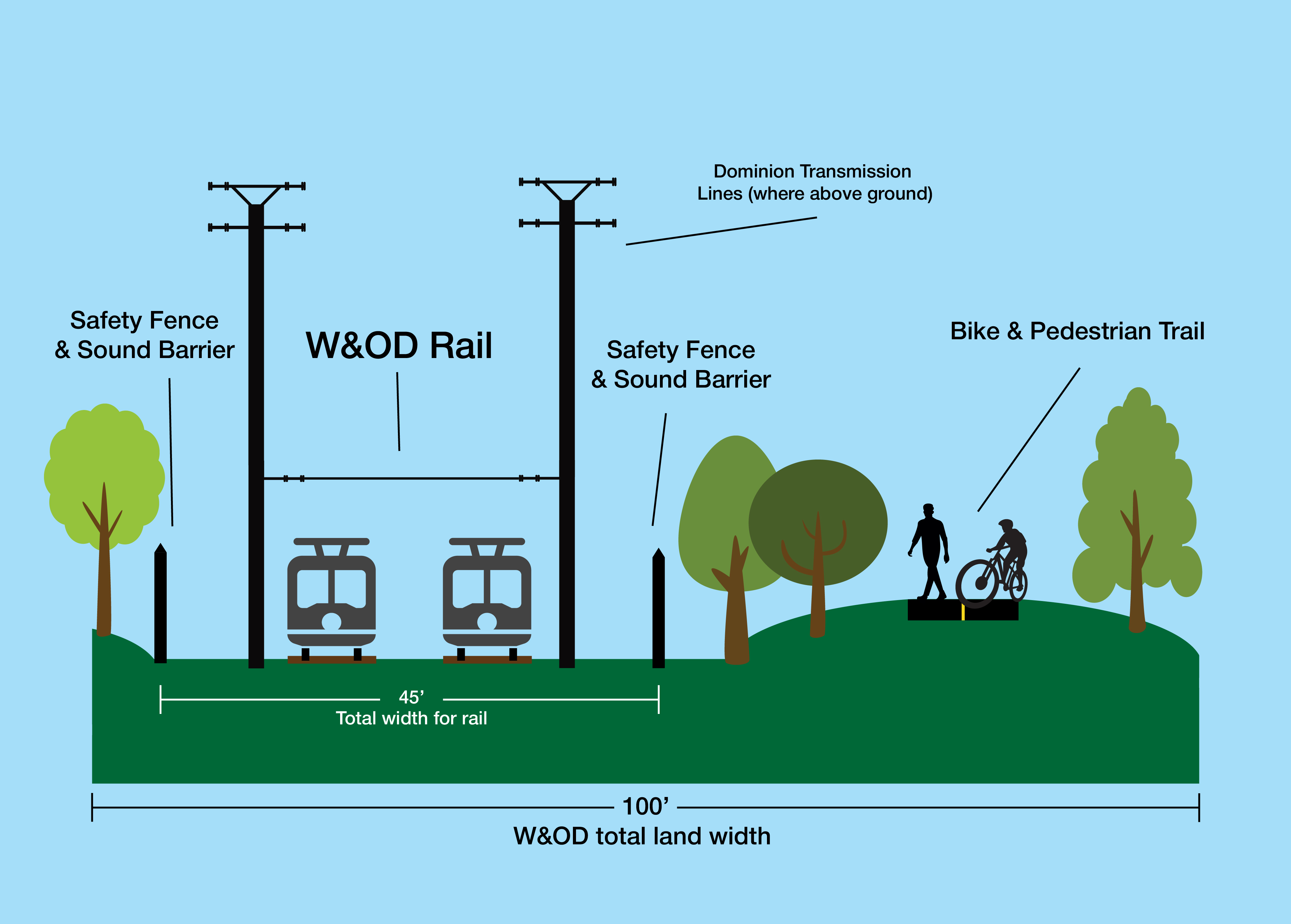
Stylized diagram of NOVA-TRAC's W&OD Rail proposal on the W&OD trail land

The advocacy group NOVA-TRAC has proposed utilizing the W&OD right-of-way to construct a commuter rail line from Purcellville and Leesburg to the Washington Metro's East Falls Church station, where riders can transfer to the Orange and Silver lines. The Hamilton town council voted to support NOVA-TRAC's plan on February 10, 2025. The council passed a resolution that supports studying the use of the W&OD rail trail corridor for rapid transit.

== See also ==
- Cycling infrastructure
- List of rail trails in Virginia
- Bluemont Junction Park
