= Mordellistena pallipes =

Conservation status
- Unranked (NatureServe)

Scientific classification
- Domain: Eukaryota
- Kingdom: Animalia
- Phylum: Arthropoda
- Class: Insecta
- Order: Coleoptera
- Suborder: Polyphaga
- Infraorder: Cucujiformia
- Family: Mordellidae
- Genus: Mordellistena
- Species: M. pallipes

Binomial name
- Mordellistena pallipes J.B. Smith, 1882

Species of beetle

Mordellistena pallipes, the pale-legged tumbling flower beetle, is a species of beetle from the family Mordellidae. It has an extensive distribution across the northern United States and southern Canada, with its native range stretching east-to-west from New Hampshire to Minnesota, and north-to-south from Ontario to Virginia.

== Taxonomy ==
Mordellistena pallipes was first described by American entomologist John Bernhardt Smith in 1882, based on a specimen collected in Ithaca, New York. The holotype specimen is held in the Smithsonian National Museum of Natural History's entomology collection.

It has been suggested that Mordellistena pallipes and its congener Mordellistena pratensis, which is known from South Carolina and Florida, may represent geographically separated forms of the same species. If they were to be formally merged into one species, Mordellistena pallipes would hold precedence as the valid name.

== Description ==
Mordellistena pallipes is a small, darkly-colored beetle measuring 2.5–3.2 mm (0.10–0.13 in) in length from its head to the tip of its elytra. Its leg ridge formula has been variably listed as either 2-3-1 or 2(3)-3-1, either of which allow it to be distinguished from its close relative Mordellistena pratensis, which has a leg ridge formula of 2-2-2. Its common name, the "pale-legged tumbling flower beetle," is derived from its pale-colored legs, which were declared to be a diagnostic characteristic of the species in Smith's original description. However, later research conducted by Emil Liljeblad in 1945 determined that the middle and posterior legs are often significantly darker or even black in coloration.

J.B. Smith's original description of the species is as follows: "All the legs pale testaceous—an unusual character in the genus—this point and the darker margins of elytra render the species easily recognizable. The rudiment of the third ridge is very short, having but two or three spinules but the pale color of the legs renders it easily noted, as the spinules are black. One specimen, Ithaca, N. Y.; my collection."

== Distribution and range ==
Mordellistena pallipes is native to the northeastern United States and southern Canada. It has been recorded in the U.S. states of Minnesota, Michigan (Grand Ledge), New Hampshire (Tamworth), Massachusetts (Framingham, Natick), New York, Maryland (Edgewater), and Virginia (Dyke Marsh), and the Canadian provinces of Ontario, Manitoba (Aweme), and Saskatchewan.

== Conservation status ==
The conservation status of this species is not well-documented, likely due to its rarity in nature. It has not been evaluated by the IUCN Red List, and is unranked by NatureServe. It is known to occur in several protected areas, including the Dyke Marsh Wildlife Preserve in Virginia and Criddle/Vane Homestead Provincial Park in Manitoba.
