= Gravelly Point =

River cape in Virginia, United States

Coordinates: 38.8651°N 77.0391°W

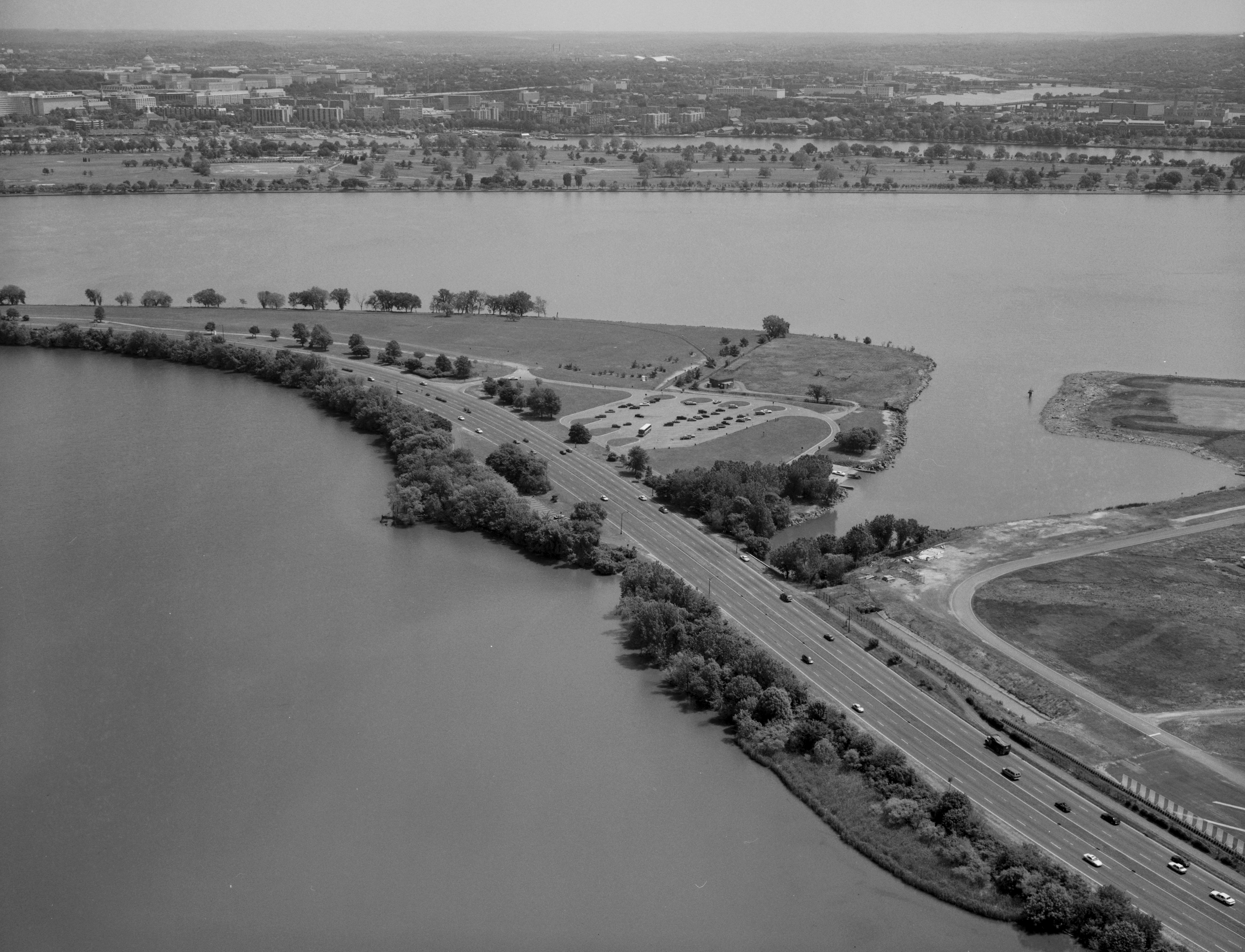
Aerial view of Gravelly Point circa 1968 with the George Washington Parkway in the foreground and the end of Reagan National Airport runway 19 at right.

Gravelly Point is an area within the National Park Service's George Washington Memorial Parkway in Arlington County, Virginia. It is located on the west side of the Potomac River, immediately north of Roaches Run and Ronald Reagan Washington National Airport.

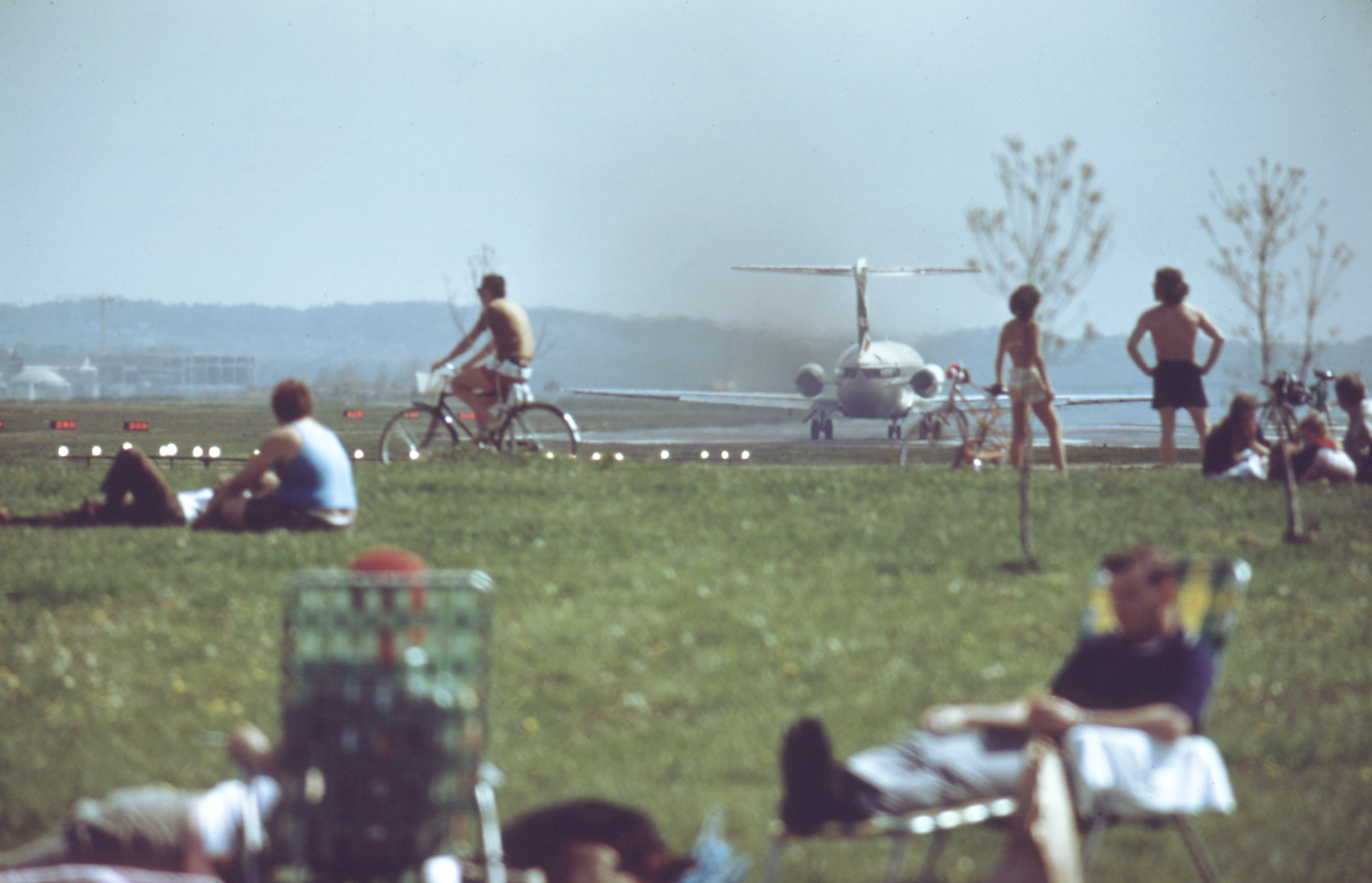
Gravelly Point visitors watching an aircraft land in April 1973.

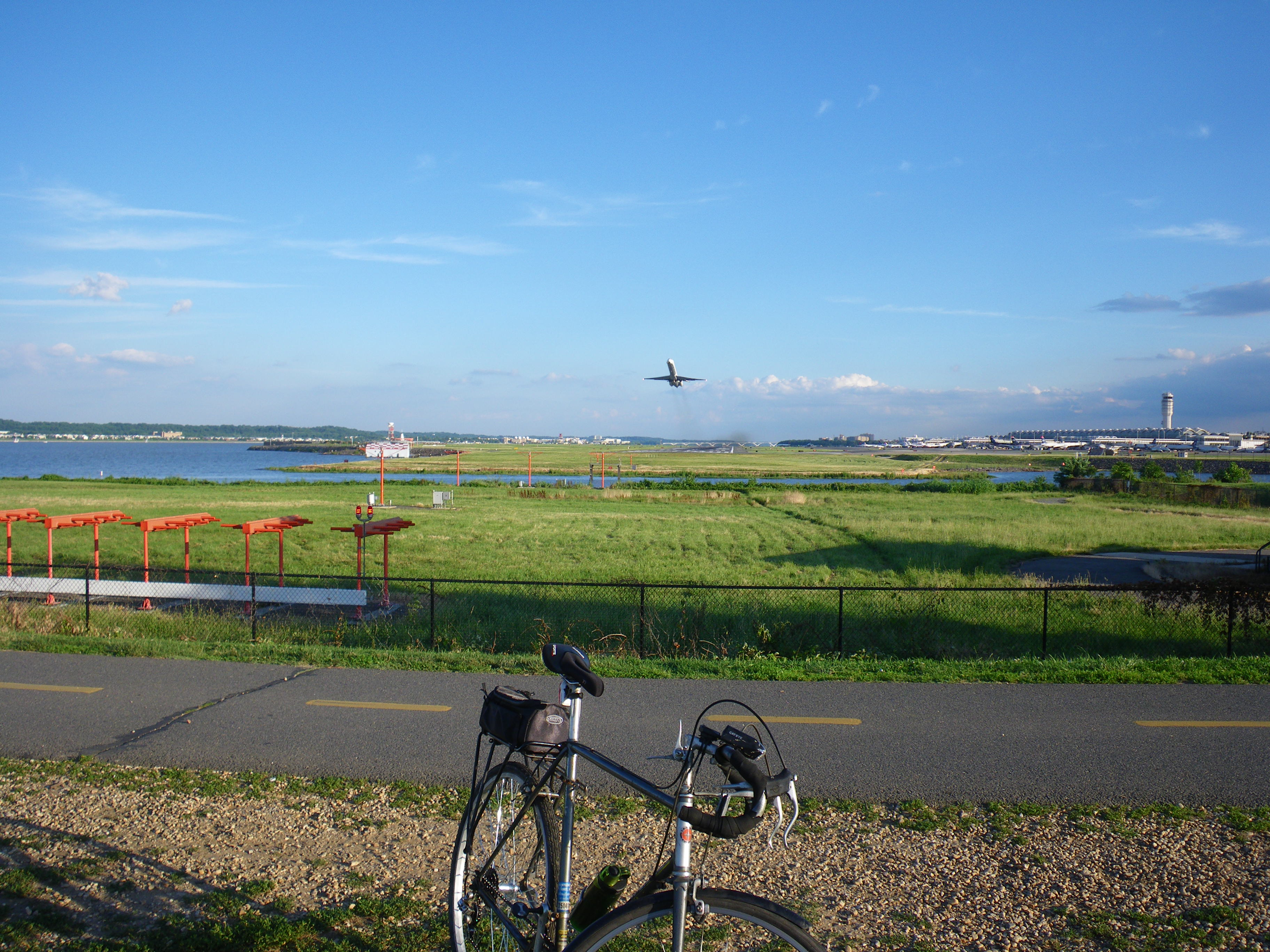
Airplane taking off from Ronald Reagan Washington National Airport as seen looking south from the Mount Vernon Trail at Gravelly Point in 2009.

Gravelly Point has served as an iconic spot for plane spotters, picnickers and others to watch planes take off and land from National Airport for more than half a century.

== Developments ==
In 2023, Arlington County announced it would allocate $1 million for implementing improvements at Gravelly Point. The funds were allocated ahead of the scheduled construction of a pedestrian bridge between Crystal City and the airport, which would be located less than a mile from the area.

== Geography ==
It sits directly under the glide path of the airport's main runways; aircraft pass between 100 and 200 feet overhead on final approach to land on Runway 19 and when taking off from Runway 1.

The paved Mount Vernon Trail travels through the area. A rugby pitch hosts high school matches. The area also has a boat launch and a Capital Bikeshare dock.

== Security ==
Part of the George Washington Memorial Parkway, the public recreation area is patrolled by the U.S. Park Police. The public is kept off the airport land by the Metropolitan Washington Airports Authority Police.

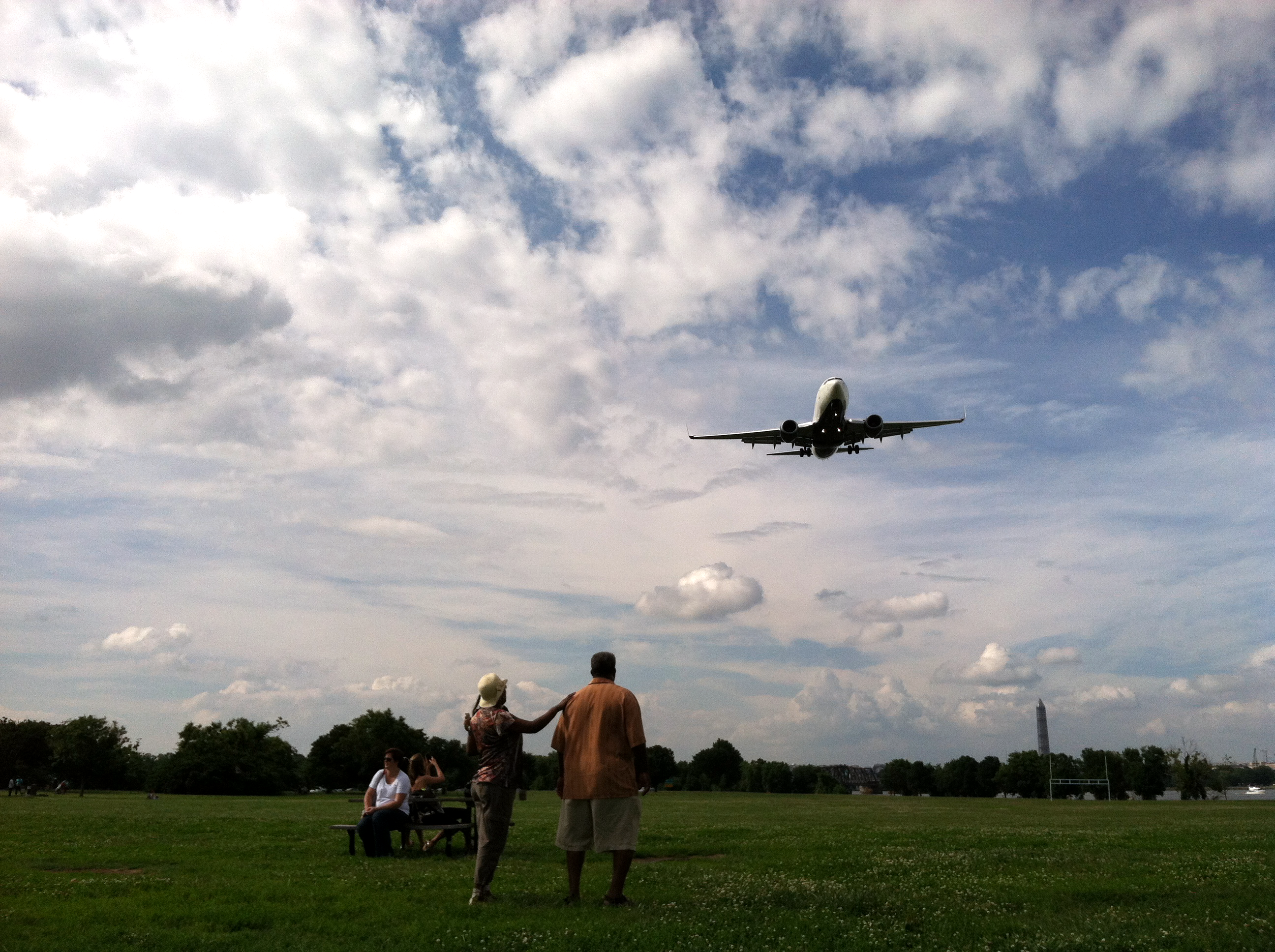
A couple at Gravelly Point watching an airplane approach Reagan National from the north in 2013.

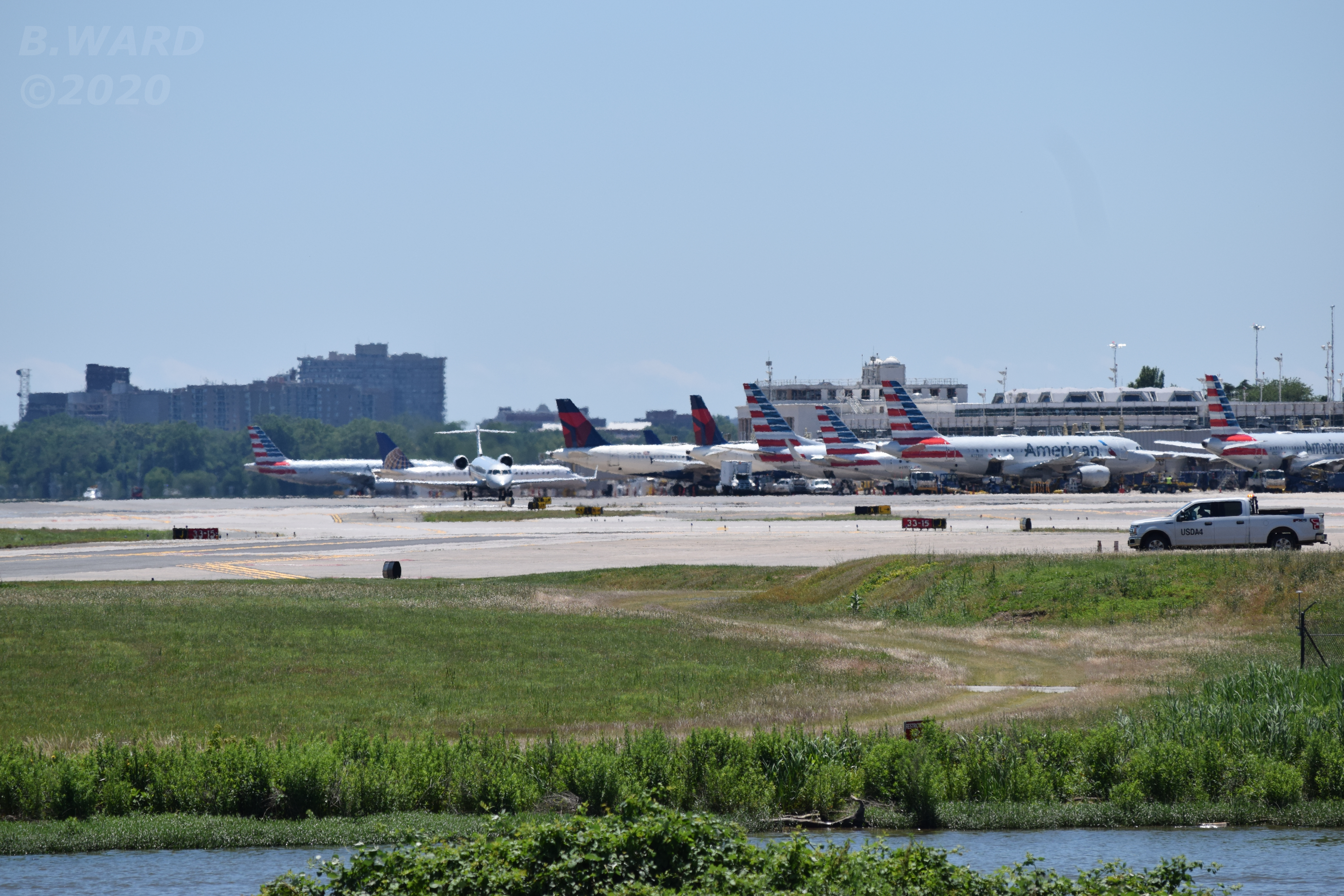
The view of Reagan National Airport terminals B and C from Gravelly Point.

== Proposed renaming ==
Between 2016 and 2021, Representative Jody Hice of Georgia, a Republican, introduced four unsuccessful bills in the House of Representatives to rename the Gravelly Point area "Nancy Reagan Memorial Park." His legislation, filed as H.R. 5457 (2016), H.R. 553 (2017-18), H.R. 308 (2019), and H.R. 4364 (2021), was each time referred to a subcommittee by the House Committee on Natural Resources, proceeding no further. Hice left office in 2023.
