= Washington Sailing Marina =

- Click on the map for a fullscreen view

Location
- Country: United States
- Location: Alexandria, Virginia
- Coordinates: 38°50′0″N 77°2′31″W

The Washington Sailing Marina is on Daingerfield Island in Alexandria, Virginia (United States), on the Potomac River. It hosts the Potomac River Sailing Association, Daingerfield Island Sailing Fleet, Sailing Club of Washington, and the Georgetown University Sailing Team. It is part of the National Park Service's George Washington Memorial Parkway and operated by a concessioner.
