= Dyke Marsh =

Wetland and wildlife preserve in Virginia, US

Coordinates: 38°46′04″N 77°02′55″W

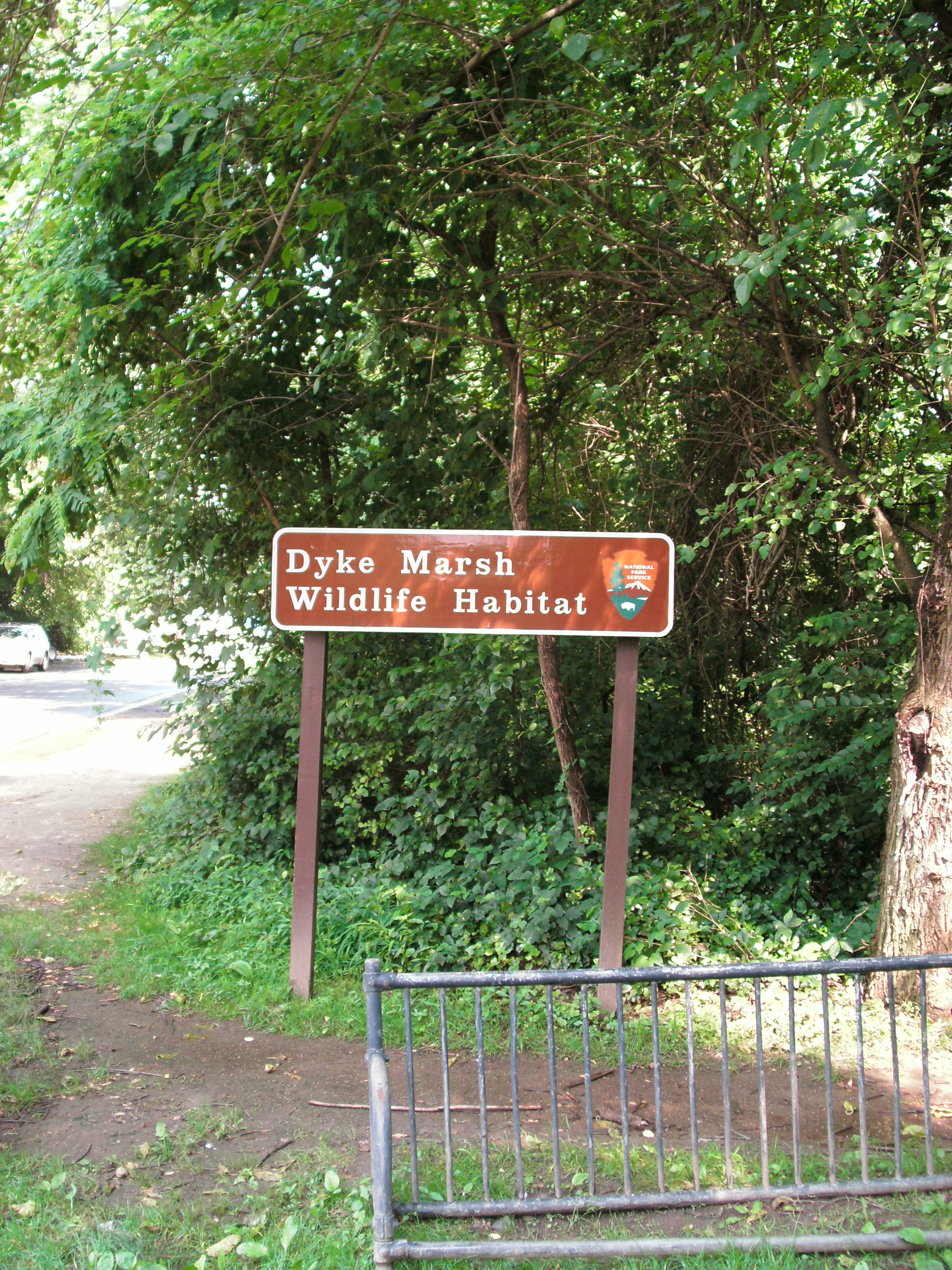
Entrance to the Dyke Marsh Wildlife Preserve

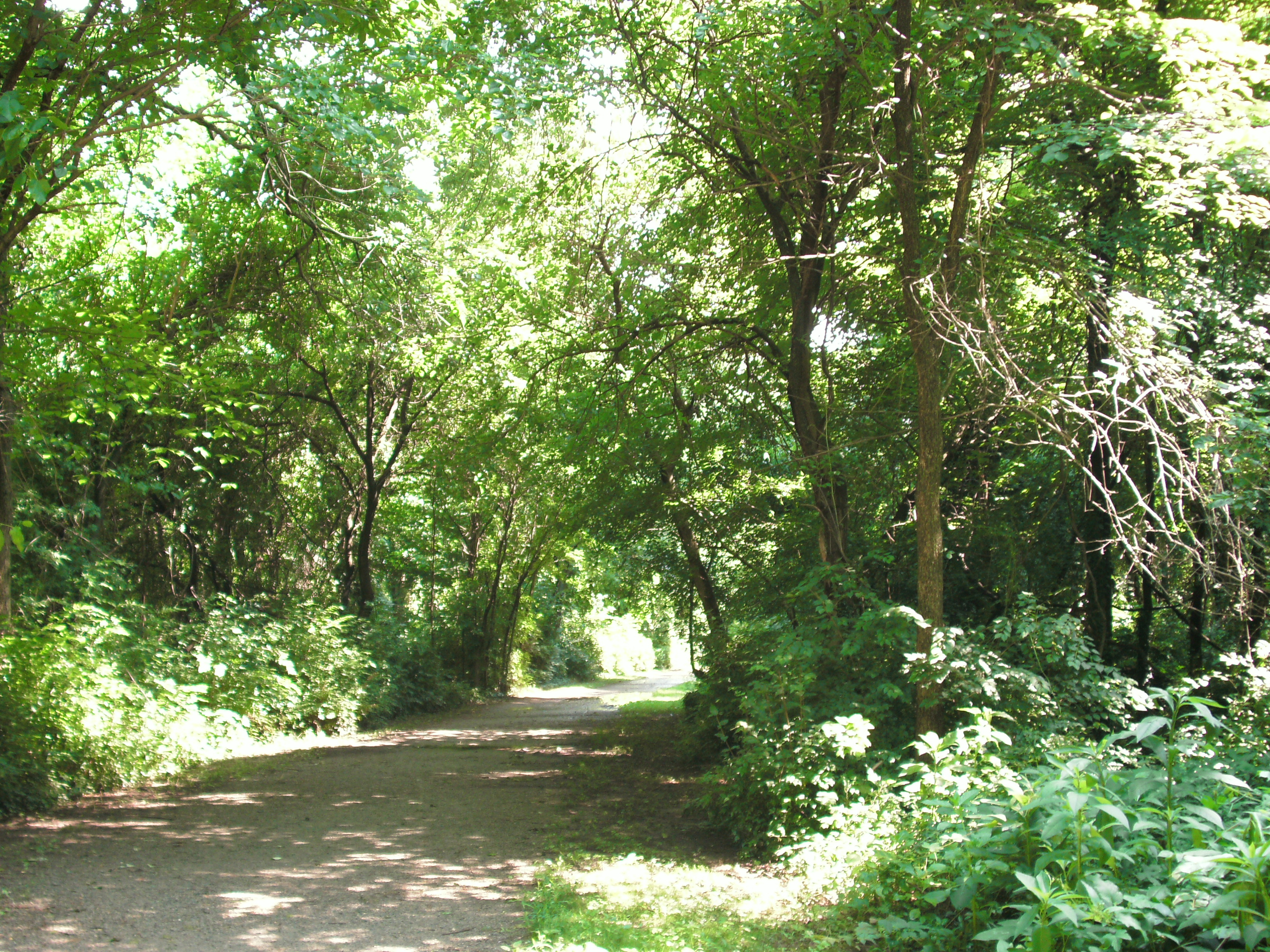
Walking path in the Preserve

Dyke Marsh is a freshwater wetland and wildlife preserve located on the west bank of the Potomac River south of Alexandria, Virginia between Old Town Alexandria and Mount Vernon. Dyke Marsh consists of about 380 acres (1.5 km^{2}) of tidal marsh, floodplain, and swamp forest. It formed 5,000 to 7,000 years ago. With a total size of 485 acres, Dyke Marsh is one of the largest remaining pieces of freshwater tidal wetlands left in the Baltimore-Washington Metropolitan Area. The marsh is managed by the National Park Service as part of the George Washington Memorial Parkway. Dyke Marsh contains a wide array of plant and animal life. "Haul Road" is a trail that leads visitors into the marsh. It is frequented by area birdwatchers. Dyke Marsh is located off the George Washington Memorial Parkway at the Belle Haven Marina exit.

Here the fresh water of the upper Potomac mixes with the salt water of the lower Potomac. The fresh water tends to float above the tidal salt water producing a tidal freshwater marsh.

== Name ==
Dyke Marsh got its name because it was within a dike at one point. Earthen walls were built around the perimeter of the marsh in the 19th century to create more "fast land," land not inundated by tides. This land was used for farming purposes, mainly to graze livestock or to grow crops.

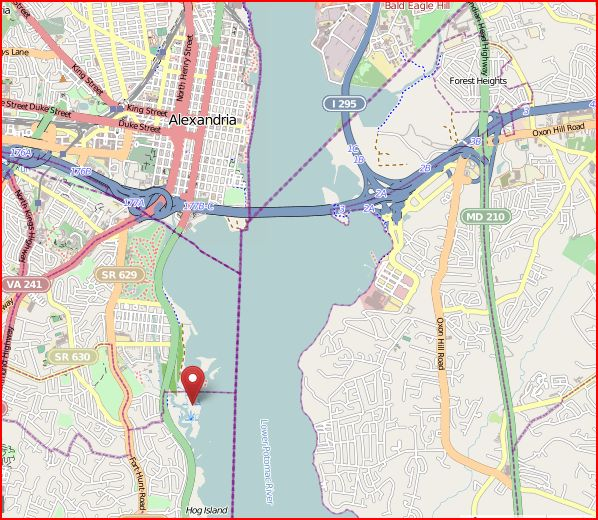

One of the oldest photographs of Dyke Marsh is a circa 1909 picture postcard created for the Alexandria-Mt. Vernon trolley line (whose light rail tracks were replaced by the George Washington Memorial Parkway in 1932.) The photograph is labelled: The "Dyke," a favorite resort for fishermen and hunters on the line of the Mt. Vernon Railroad, near Alexandria, Va.

== Wildlife ==
Dyke Marsh has an abundance of wildlife. Evidence of a beaver population is visible along the "Haul Road" and muskrat have been spotted numerous times. Little brown bats and red fox can be seen at night. Cottontail rabbit, gray squirrels, shrews, and field mice (the vole) can also be found in and around the marsh. The most obvious inhabitant of Dyke Marsh is the red-winged blackbird, with its distinct call. The red-winged blackbird nests among the cattails and feeds on insects and seeds. Nearly 300 species of birds have been seen in Dyke Marsh. It is known as one of the best birdwatching sites in the Washington Metropolitan Area. The lower Potomac is a natural migration route, especially for water birds. In 2014 a beetle species, Pterostichus sculptus, new to Virginia was discovered at Dyke Marsh.

== Plants ==
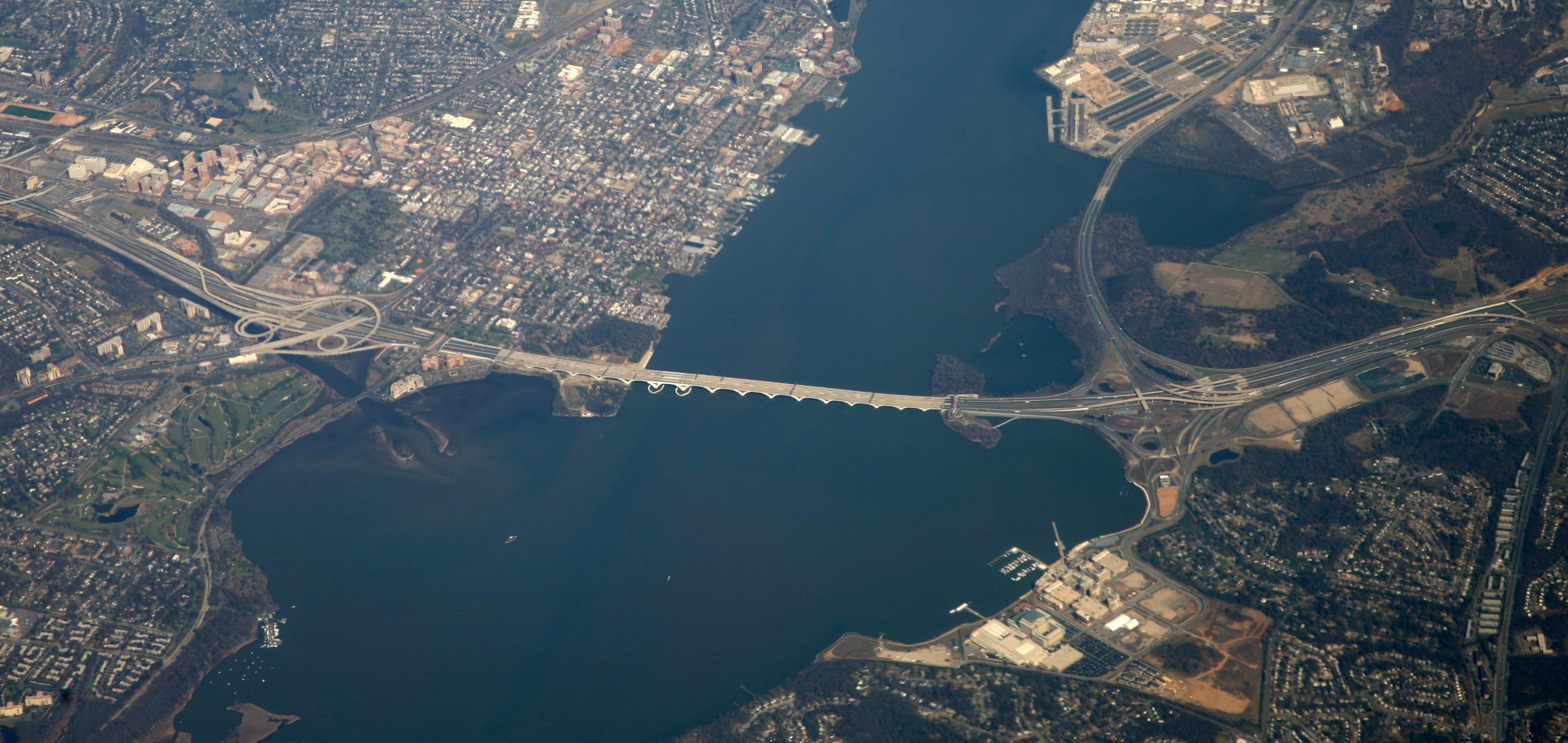
Northern tip of Dyke Marsh just visible at lower left

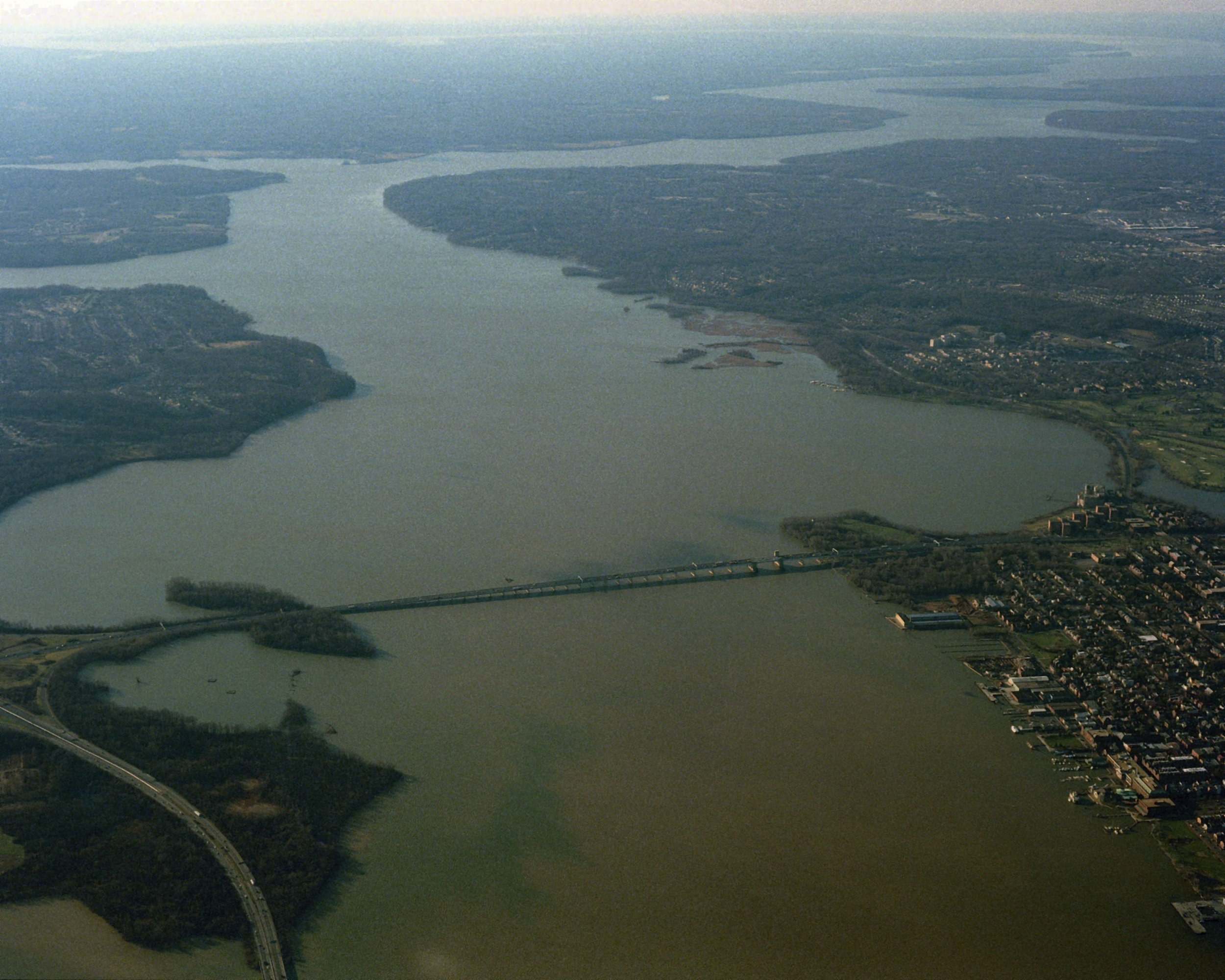
Looking south in 1991. Dyke Marsh is the light-colored area at upper center right

More than 360 species of plants have been found at Dyke Marsh. The narrow-leafed cattail is the dominant species in the area. It normally develops its characteristic flower spike by June. Many other species of plant occupy the marsh including several types of Sagittaria, arrow arum, pickerelweed, sweetflag, spatter-pond lily, and northern wild rice. The rice attracts animals such as the red-winged blackbird and waterfowl.

== Changes ==
Dyke Marsh is much different than it used to be. It is estimated that the marsh once consisted of 650 acres (2.6 km^{2}). In the 1950s and 1960s, dredging took place, which reduced it to its current size and configuration. Shoreline erosion is noticeable along the Haul Road, showing that the dredging is still making an impact. Human influences have also led to the introduction of several types of exotic, or non-native, plants to the marsh. These plants are very opportunistic and often outcompete beneficial native species of plants. Exotic vines, such as the Asian porcelain berry, Japanese honeysuckle, and Asiatic bittersweet have begun smothering parts of the floodplain forest. Yellow iris and the common reed are exotic plants that now inhabit the actual marsh. Efforts are being made to prevent the introduction of the purple loosestrife.

== Uses ==
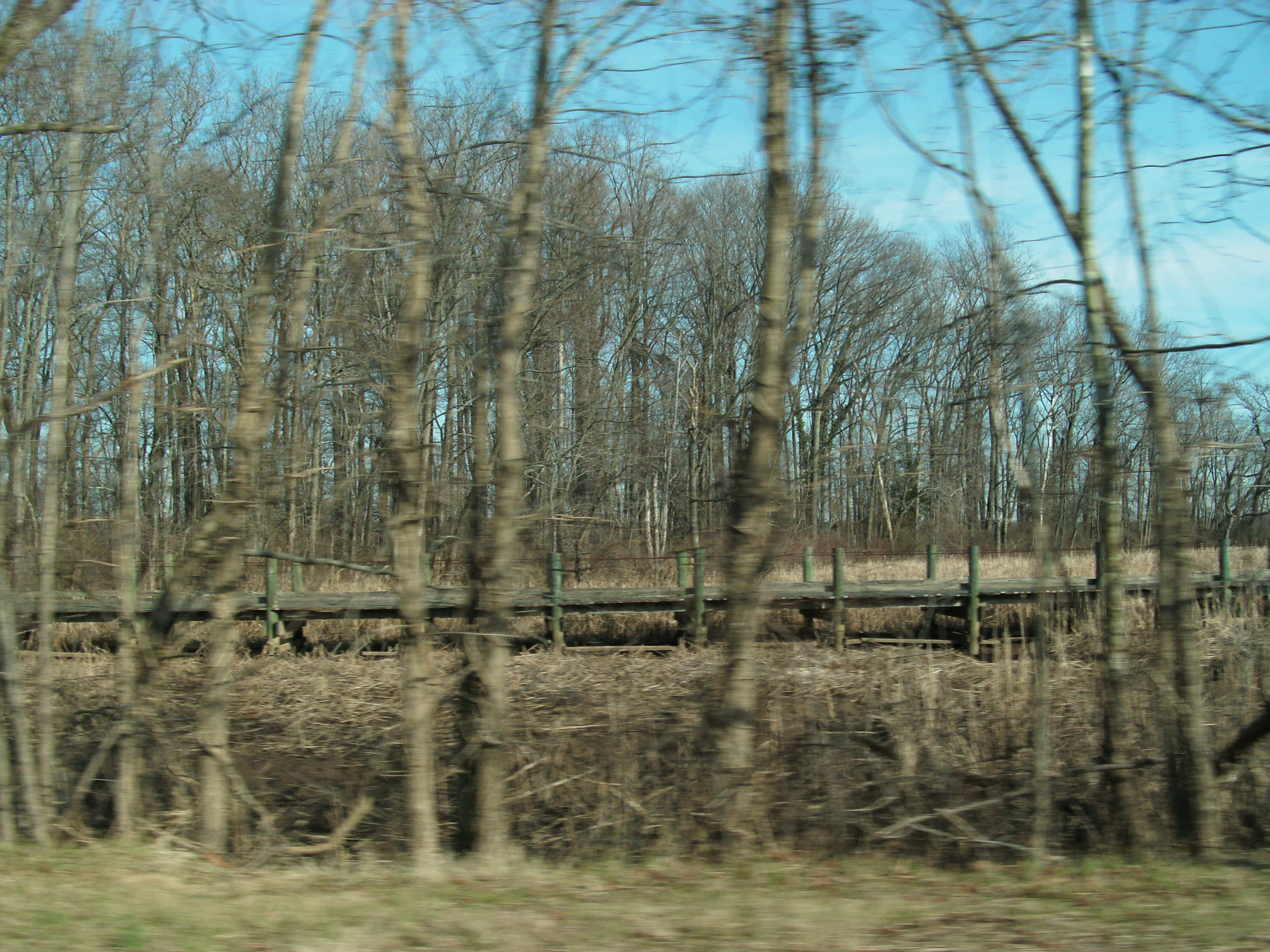
Dyke Marsh and the Mount Vernon Trail seen from the G.W. Parkway

Dyke Marsh is just east of the George Washington Memorial Parkway and the Mount Vernon Trail. Thousands of bicyclists, walkers, and runners go through Dyke Marsh on a weekly basis on the Mount Vernon Trail. Just off of the trail, there is a sitting area on a boardwalk over the marsh. The interior path is J-shaped and goes south from the marina entrance and then turns east onto a peninsula. Birdwatchers, animal lovers, and nature enthusiasts often visit the sitting area in an effort to catch a glimpse of what Dyke Marsh has to offer. Visitors also come at night to watch the fireflies in the marsh and trees.
