= Pterostichus sculptus =

Scientific classification
- Domain: Eukaryota
- Kingdom: Animalia
- Phylum: Arthropoda
- Class: Insecta
- Order: Coleoptera
- Suborder: Adephaga
- Family: Carabidae
- Genus: Pterostichus
- Species: P. sculptus

Binomial name
- Pterostichus sculptus LeConte, 1853

Species of beetle

Pterostichus sculptus is a species of woodland ground beetle in the family Carabidae.
