= Matt Scoggin =

American diver

Personal information
- Full name: Mathew Aaron Scoggin
- Born: August 17, 1963 (age 62) Saitama, Japan

Sport
- Sport: Diving
- College team: University of Texas 1987
- Club: Mission Viejo Natadores
- Coached by: Ron O'Brien (Natadores); Mike Brown (U. Texas)
Medal record
Men's diving
Representing the United States
Pan American Games
Silver medal – second place	1987 Indianapolis	10m platform

Mathew Aaron "Matt" Scoggin (born August 17, 1963, in Saitama, Japan) is a retired diver from the United States, who competed for the University of Texas and was a Platform Diving participant at the 1992 Barcelona Olympics. He coached diving at Longhorn Diving Club beginning in 1986, and at the University of Texas beginning in 1994. In his accomplished career of over thirty years as a coach at Texas, he has been a seven-time NCAA Coach of the Year and served as a U.S. Olympic Coach in 2000, 2008, 2012, 2020 and 2024. As of 2024, his divers at the University of Texas have earned 23 individual NCAA championships and 114 individual Big 12 titles.

== Early life ==
Scoggin was born on August 17, 1963, in Saitama, Japan to father Philip, a former Airforce major who worked as a computer scientist, and mother Joan, a Secretary. His brother Sam was a competitive diver who swam for Penn State. He spent his teens in Great Falls, Virginia and attended Langley High School in McClean, where he took up diving in his Freshman year. His prior sport was gymnastics which he began as an eight-year-old in Austin, Texas. Gymnastics gave Scoggin a basis for his diving career, though Matt had also trained as a swimmer. Scoggin's father was an Air Force Officer, and the family moved often, living in Japan, Omaha, Nebraska and Texas before moving to Great Falls, Virginia.

=== High school era diving ===
During his High School years in Great Falls, Virginia at the age of 13, Scoggin began to compete and train with a diving team coached by former University of Maryland Diver Don Quesada, who would be a valuable mentor and provide outstanding training to Scoggin. Quesada's dive team trained in Arlington, Virginia, fifteen miles Southeast of Great Falls. Matt began to gain recognition as a young diver at the National Junior Olympics in Lincoln, Nebraska at the age of 15 placing 31st of 43 overall, and 34th in national competition on the 1 meter board on August 13, 1978. Scoggin had also competed in the 1977 National Junior Olympics, but had not performed as well.

In 1979, Scoggin's Great Falls, Virginia area coach Don Quesada received a letter noting that Matt had attracted the attention of Ron O'Brien, the Head Diving Coach for California's Mission Viejo Nadadores. After a move to California, Scoggin began dive training with Hall of Fame Coach O'Brien and the Natadores, a highly competitive program where he continued to compete in 1980–81, living with a host family. O'Brien had served as a U.S. Olympic diving coach. While training with the Natadores, Scoggin attended and graduated Capistrano Valley High School in 1981. By 1980, Scoggin continued to excel and was regularly placing in the top 8 in National diving meets. In his early career, he finished 8th, competing for the Natadores in Platform diving at the U.S. Outdoor Diving Championships in Bartlesville, Oklahoma on August 23, 1980.

== University of Texas diver ==
Scoggin's coach Ron O'Brien recommended Scoggin consider diving for the University of Texas. From 1981 to 1985, Scoggin attended the University of Texas and served as a swim team captain competing for Hall of Fame Swimming and Diving Head Coach Eddie Reese while receiving instruction from UT Diving Coach Mike Brown. At Texas, Scoggin was an NCAA one-meter champion in 1983 and 1984, and was a U.S. 10-meter national champion four times. He graduated Texas in 1987 with a degree in Social Work, and initially began a career in Real Estate.

Scoggin continued his swimming career after graduating University of Texas. He won a silver medal in Platform Diving at the 1987 Pan American Games, and a bronze in Platform diving at the 1990 Goodwill Games. He was a four-time national and world champion as a member of the 1991 Pan Am US team. At the Olympic Festival, he was a US Champion for three successive years from 1989 to 1991. He repeated as a US Champion in both indoor and outdoor competition in 1989, and in 1990 won again in outdoor competition. In international competition, he had a long running ten-year career as a member of the US National Diving Team from 1980 to 1982 and from 1984 through 92.

Scoggin injured his back before the 1984 Olympic trials, and did not make the finals, failing to qualify for the U.S. team. He required a while to recover. Continuing to train, at the 1988 Olympic trials in Indianapolis, he placed fifth in the 10-meter platform finals around August 21, 1988, and could not outperform rival Greg Louganis.

== 1992 Olympics ==
He competed for the U.S. Olympic team at the 1992 Summer Olympics in Barcelona while serving as team Captain, and finished in tenth place in the Men's 10-meter Platform event. Scoggin's former University of Texas Head Swimming and Diving Coach Eddie Reese also served as the head swimming coach for the U.S. team at the 1992 Olympics and his former Diving Coach at the Mission Viejo Natadores Ron O'Brien served as the Olympic Head Diving Coach that year.

Scoggin was married to former UT diver Rebecca Culver, a former U. Texas diver who in 2008 received the Frank Erwin Award, recognizing individuals making outstanding contributions to swimming and diving with the University of Texas. Scoggin met Culver as a diver while competing in Virginia, and they both dove for the University of Texas. The couple have one daughter.

== Coaching ==
Since 1994, Scoggin has been the Diving Coach for his alma mater, the University of Texas. As of 2025, in his career of over 30 years with Texas, his divers have earned 23 individual NCAA championships and 114 individual Big 12 titles. He has been a seven-time NCAA Coach of the Year. In only his third season with Texas, he was the 1997 NCAA National Women's Diving Coach of the Year. As of 2025, Scoggin divers had won twenty Men's Platform Big 12 Championships, sixteen Men's 1 Meter Big 12 Champions, and eighteen Men's 3 Meter Big 12 Champions. At the Big 12 Championships, his women's teams have had twenty 1 meter Champions, nineteen 3 meter champions and 21 Platform champions.

As a Diving Coach, he was a CSCAA Women's Diving Coach of the Year four times in 1997, 1998, 1999, and 2024. He was a six-time CSCAA Men's Diving Coach of the Year in 1999, 2000, 2012, 2014, 2019 and 2021. As of 2024, as a highly recognized coach in his conference, he was an eighteen-time Big 12 Men's Diving Coach of the Year, and the Big 12 Women's Diving Coach of the Year fifteen times.

Scoggins formerly coached Austin's Longhorn Diving Club beginning in 1986, where he won many Coach of the Year awards.

In international competition, he was coach of the U.S. Olympic team in 2000, 2008, 2012, 2020 and 2024, and served as an assistant coach for the United States at the 2011, 2013 and 2022 FINA World Championships.

Scoggin has written that coaches should "show their diver’s potential and guide them with relentless optimism. Also, watch, study, and compare world-class divers, learn to pull ropes expertly, and never give up. Stay positive, keep learning, and be humble.” He is considered by many to be one of the greatest contemporary diving coaches in the country.

=== Honors ===
Scoggin has been recognized by regional organizations, Olympic associations and national coaches associations for his accomplishments. He was inducted into the University of Texas Hall of Fame in 1988. He is a member of the Texas Swimming and Diving Hall of Fame. In a more exclusive honor, he was elected to 100 Greatest Swimming and Diving Coaches by the College Swimming Coaches Association Hall of Fame. Recognized for his achievements as an Olympic Coach, in both 2009 and 2010, he was the United States Olympic Committee National Diving Coach of the Year.

USA Diving presented Scoggin the Benjamin Foundation Coaches Performance Award as well as the Ted Keller Award. Scoggin won USA Diving's Coach of Excellence Award at the USA Diving National Championships in the summer of 2010.

== See also ==
- List of University of Texas at Austin alumni
- Northern Virginia Swim League - Diving
