= Northern Virginia =

Coordinates: 38°51′45″N 77°20′42″W

- Region
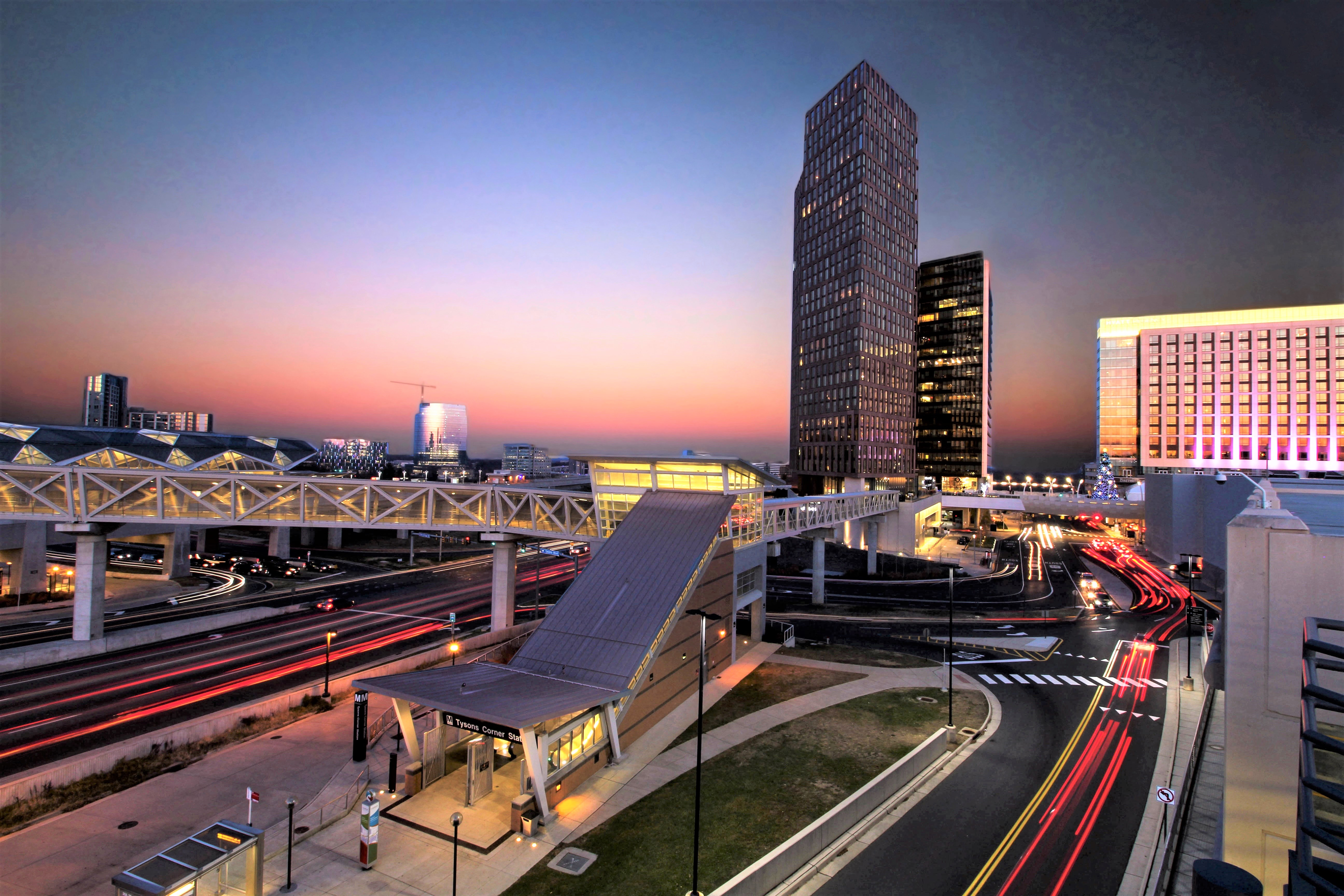
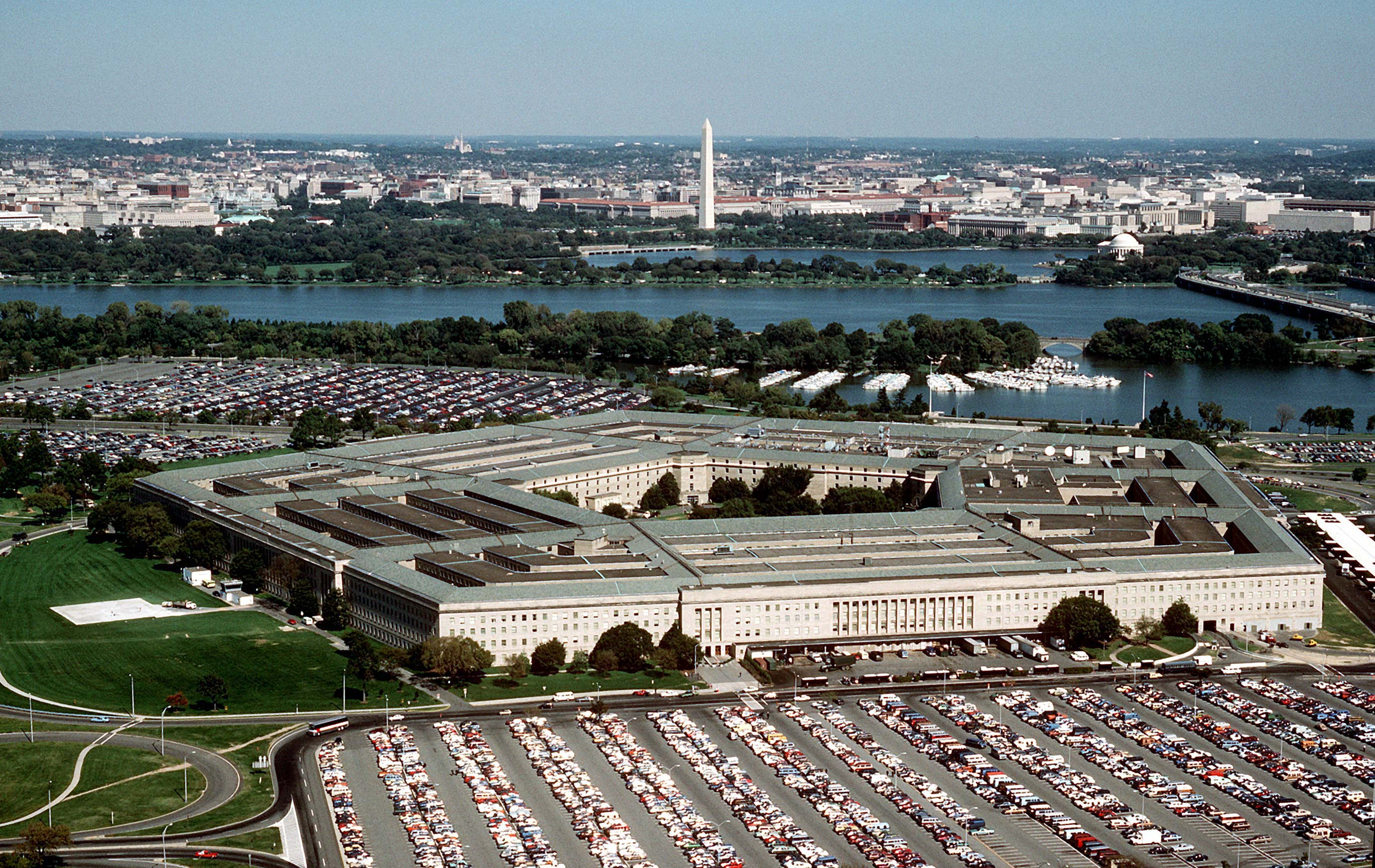
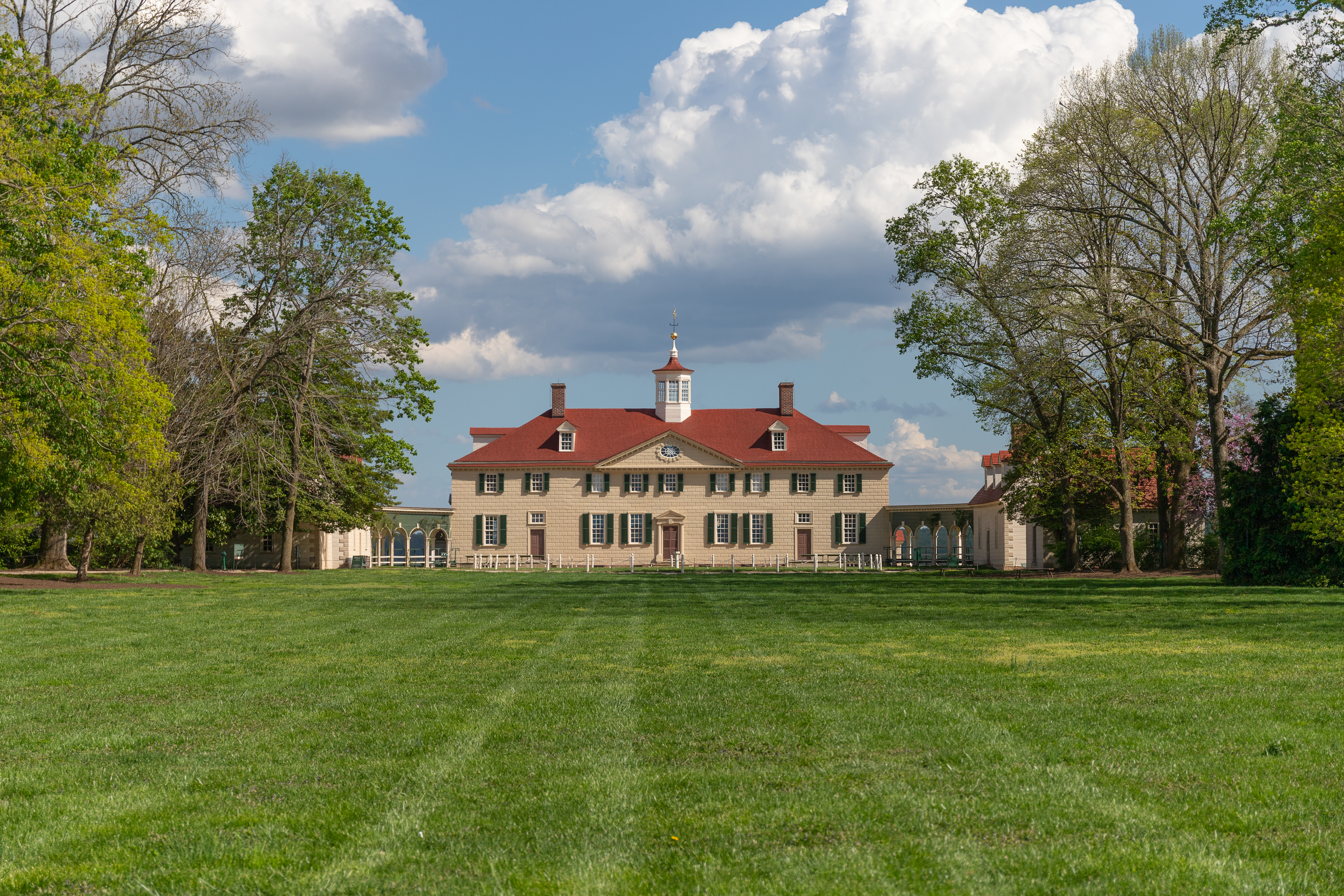
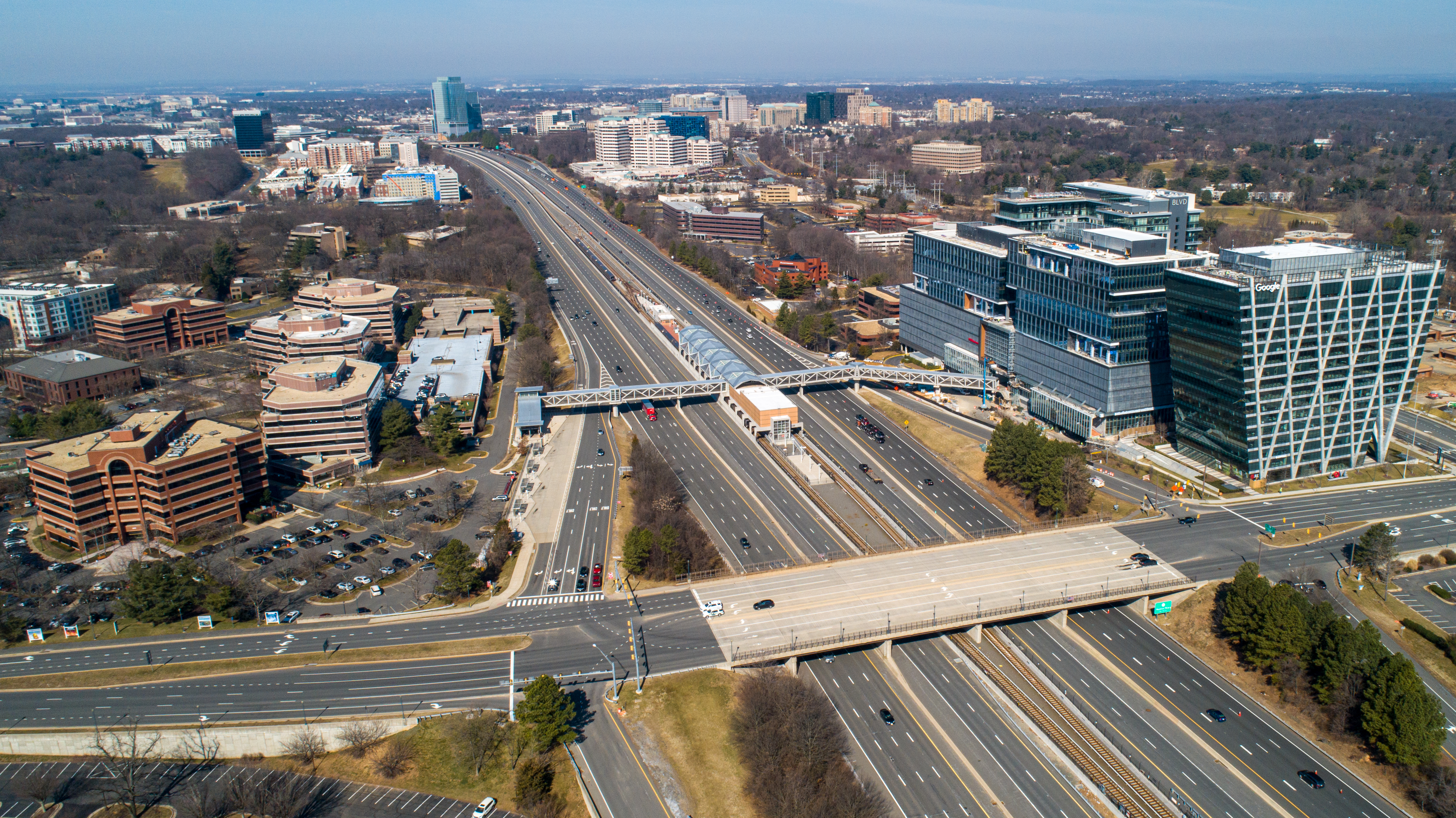
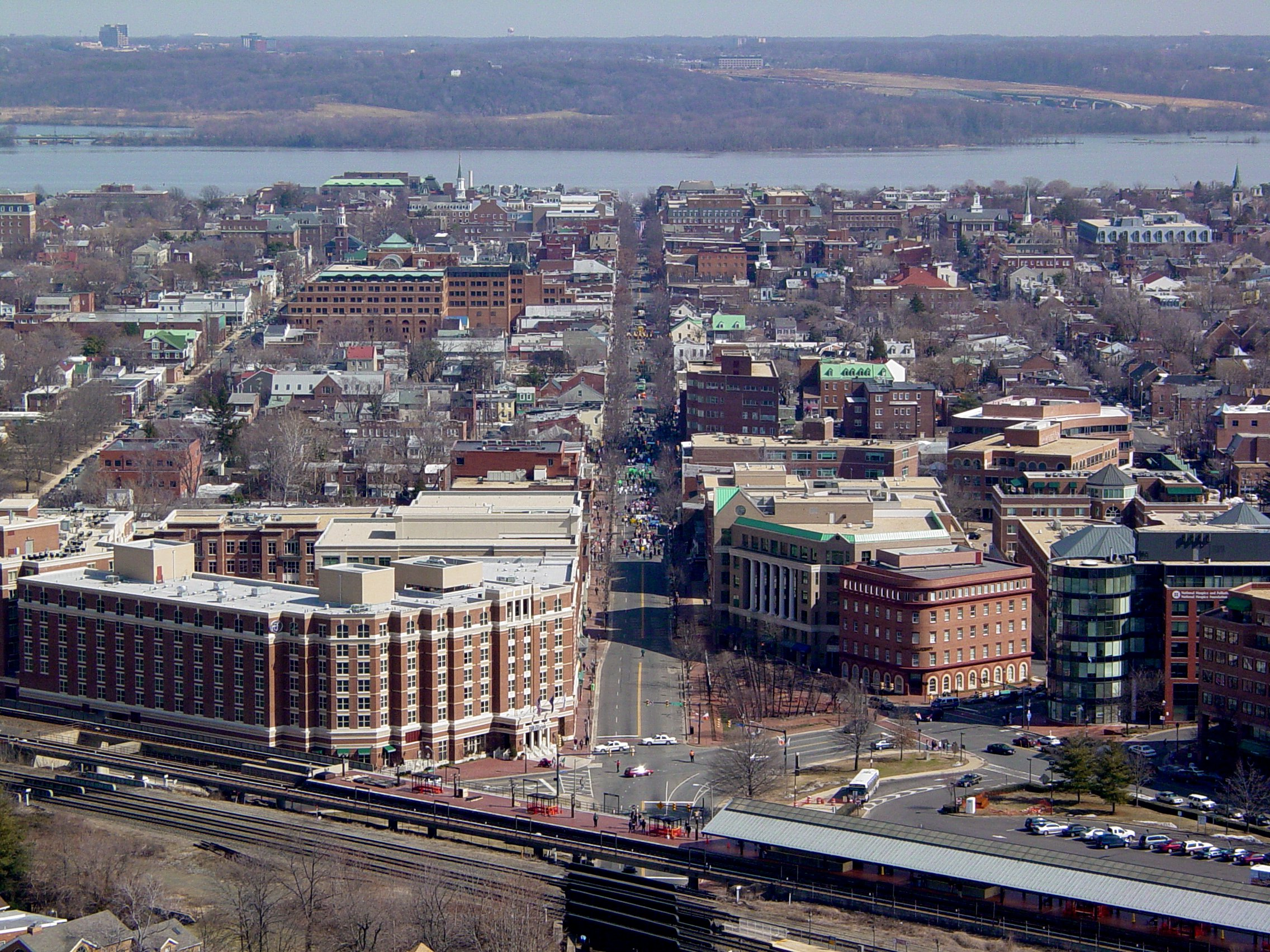
- Clockwise from the top left: Tysons station entrance on the Metro Silver Line, The Pentagon, Reston and the Dulles Toll Road, Old Town Alexandria, Mount Vernon
- Nicknames: NOVA, NoVA, Nova, the New Dominion
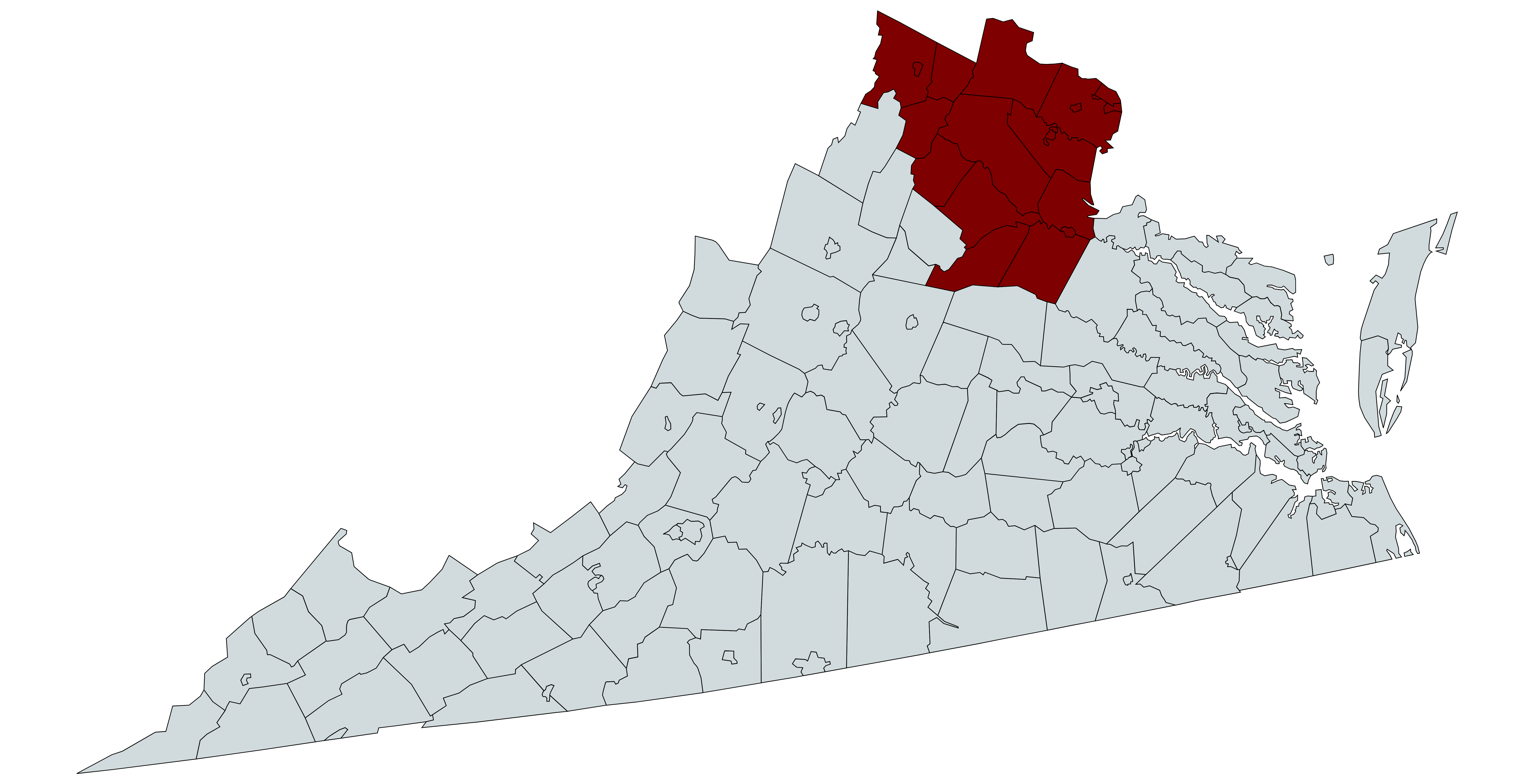
- The counties of Virginia that form part of the Washington–Baltimore combined statistical area
- Country: United States
- State: Virginia
- Counties and independent cities: Alexandria, Arlington, Clarke, Culpeper, Fairfax, Fairfax, Falls Church, Fauquier, Frederick, Fredericksburg, Loudoun, Manassas, Manassas Park, Orange, Prince William, Rappahannock, Spotsylvania, Stafford, Warren, Winchester
- Largest city: Alexandria

Area
  - Land: 4,411.45 sq mi (11,425.6 km^{2})
- 13 counties and 7 independent cities in Virginia within the Washington Metropolitan Statistical Area or Washington-Baltimore Combined Statistical Area

Population (2023)
  - Total: 3,257,133
  - Density: 738.34/sq mi (285.07/km^{2})
- Demonym: Northern Virginian

Northern Virginia, locally referred to as NOVA or NoVA, comprises several counties and independent cities in the Commonwealth of Virginia in the United States. The region radiates westward and southward from Washington, D.C., the nation's capital, and has a population of 3,257,133 people as of 2023 U.S. Census Bureau estimates, representing over a third of the state's total population. It is the most populous region in both Virginia and the regional Washington metropolitan area.

Communities in the region form the Virginia portion of the Washington metropolitan area and the larger Washington–Baltimore metropolitan area. Northern Virginia has a significantly larger job base than either Washington, D.C. or the Maryland portion of its suburbs, and is the highest-income region of Virginia, with several of the highest-income counties in the nation, including three of the ten highest counties for median household income, according to the 2019 American Community Survey.

Northern Virginia's transportation infrastructure includes two major airports, Ronald Reagan Washington National and Dulles International Airport, several lines of the Washington Metro subway system, the Virginia Railway Express suburban commuter rail system, transit bus services, bicycle sharing and bicycle lanes and trails, and an extensive network of Interstate highways and expressways.

The Pentagon, the headquarters of the U.S. Department of Defense and the world's second-largest office, is located in Arlington County in Northern Virginia. Northern Virginia also houses the George Bush Center for Intelligence, the headquarters for the Central Intelligence Agency in Langley, the United States Patent and Trademark Office in Alexandria, and several large companies, including several major aerospace manufacturing, consulting firms, and defense industry, which serve it and other components of the U.S. federal government.

Tourist attractions in Northern Virginia include various memorials, museums, and Colonial and Civil War–era sites, including Arlington National Cemetery, Fredericksburg and Spotsylvania National Military Park, Manassas National Battlefield Park, Mount Vernon, the National Museum of the Marine Corps, the National Museum of the United States Army, the Udvar-Hazy Center of the National Air and Space Museum, and the United States Marine Corps War Memorial. Other attractions include portions of the Appalachian Trail, Great Falls Park, Old Town Alexandria, Prince William Forest Park, and portions of Shenandoah National Park.

== Etymology ==
The region is sometimes spelled "northern Virginia", but the U.S. Geological Survey's Correspondence Handbook states that the 'n' in Northern Virginia should be capitalized since it is a place name rather than a direction or general area.

The name "Northern Virginia" does not seem to have been used in the early history of the area. According to Johnston, some early documents and land grants refer to the "Northern Neck of Virginia", a reference to the Northern Neck and describing an area that began at the western shore of the Chesapeake Bay and includes a territory that extended west, including all the land between the Potomac and Rappahannock rivers, with a western boundary called the Fairfax line.

The Fairfax line, surveyed in 1746, ran from the first spring of the Potomac River, which remains marked today by the Fairfax Stone, to the first spring of the Rappahannock River, at the head of the Conway River. The Northern Neck was composed of 5,282,000 acres (21,380 km^{2}), and was larger in area than five of the modern U.S. states.

The inscription on the stone, erected on October 23, 1746, reads:

This monument, at the headspring of the Potomac River, marks one of the historic spots of America. Its name is derived from Lord Thomas Fairfax, who owned all the land lying between the Potomac and Rappahannock Rivers. The first Fairfax Stone, marked "FX", was set in 1746 by Thomas Lewis, a surveyor employed by Lord Fairfax, which is the base point for the western dividing line between Maryland and West Virginia.

— Fairfax Stone inscription, October 23, 1746

Early development of the northern portion of Virginia was in the easternmost area of that early land grant, which encompasses the modern counties of Lancaster, Northumberland, Richmond, and Westmoreland. At some point, these eastern counties came to be called separately simply "the Northern Neck", and, for the remaining area west of them, the term was no longer used. By some definitions, King George County is also included in the Northern Neck, which is now considered a separate region from Northern Virginia.

One of the most prominent early mentions of "Northern Virginia" as a title was the naming of the Confederate Army of Northern Virginia during the American Civil War (1861–1865).

=== Definition ===
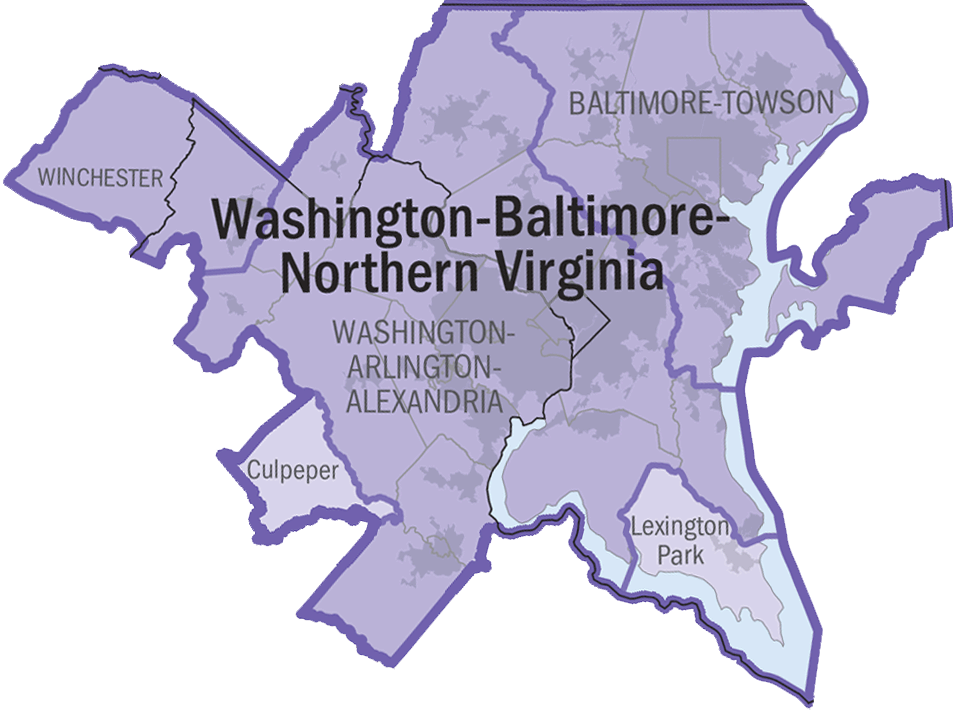
A map of the former DC-MD-VA-WV combined statistical area

The most common definition of Northern Virginia includes the independent cities and counties on the Virginia side of the Washington-Baltimore-Arlington, DC-MD-VA-WV-PA Combined Statistical Area as defined by the U.S. Office of Management and Budget within the Executive Office of the President of the United States.

Northern Virginia includes six counties, Arlington, Fairfax, Loudoun, Prince William, Spotsylvania and Stafford counties, and six independent cities, Alexandria, Fairfax, Falls Church, Fredericksburg, Manassas, and Manassas Park.

== History ==
=== Colonial period ===
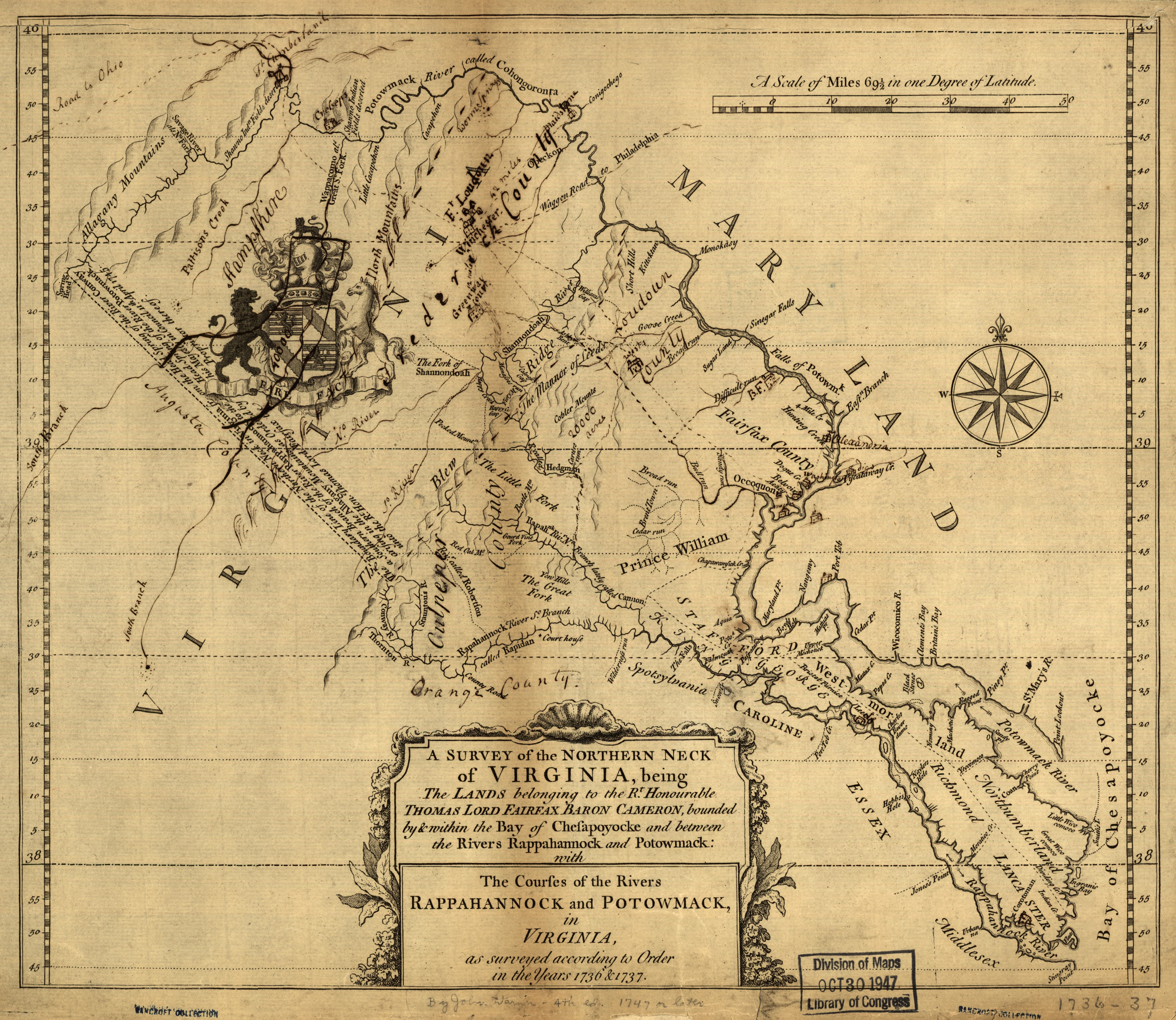
A map of the Northern Neck Proprietary land grant, c. 1737

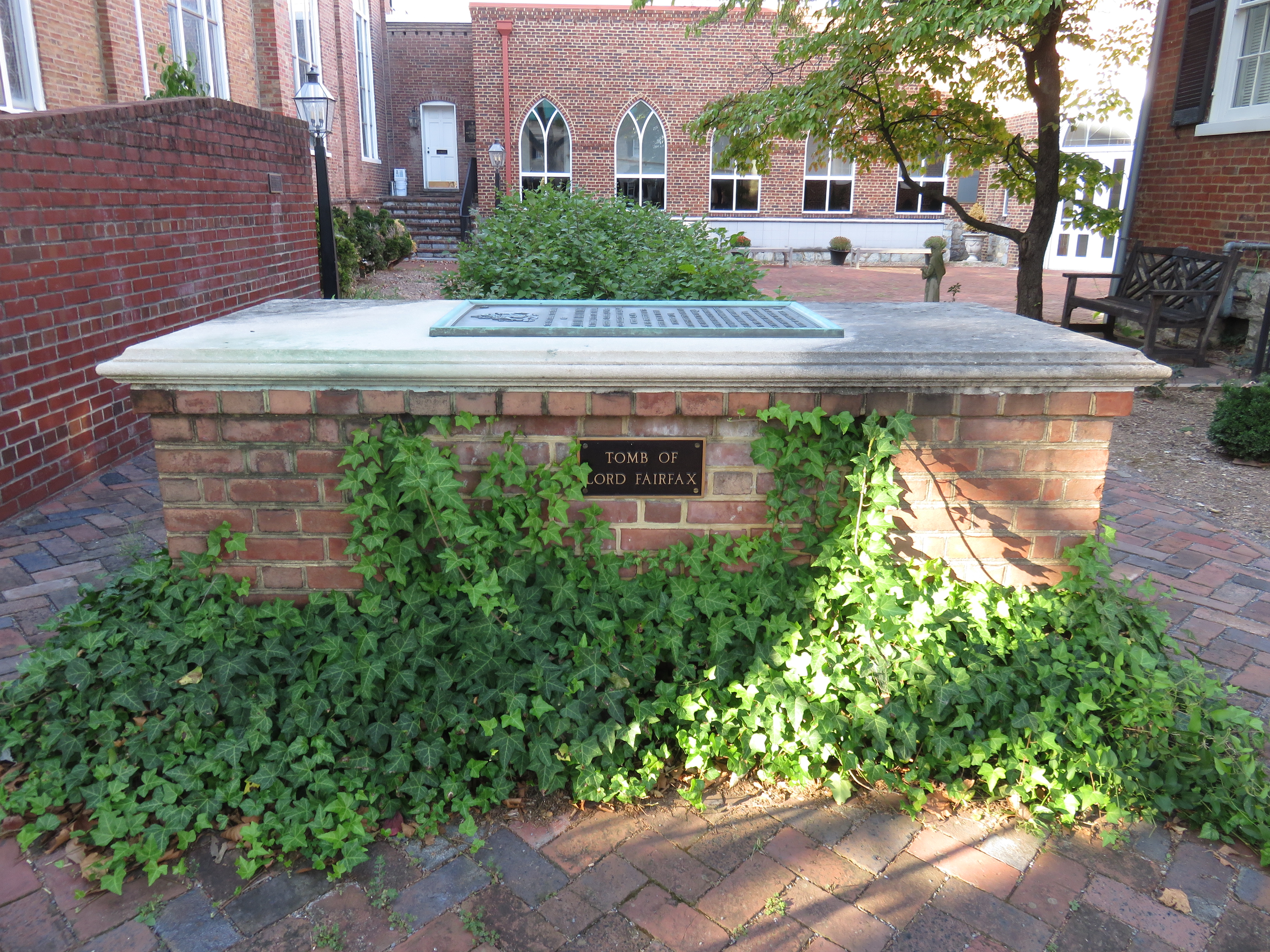
The gravesite of Thomas Fairfax, 6th Lord Fairfax of Cameron in Winchester

The Colony of Virginia was settled at Jamestown in 1607. The area now generally regarded as "Northern Virginia" was within a larger area defined by a land grant from King Charles II of England on September 18, 1649, while the monarch was in exile in France during the English Civil War. Eight of his loyal supporters were named, among them Thomas Culpeper.

On February 25, 1673, a new charter was given to Thomas Lord Culpeper and Henry Earl of Arlington. Lord Culpeper was named the Royal Governor of Virginia from 1677 to 1683. Culpeper County was later named for him when it was formed in 1749; however, history does not seem to record him as one of the better of Virginia's colonial governors. Although he became governor of Virginia in July 1677, he did not come to Virginia until 1679, and even then seemed more interested in maintaining his land in the "Northern Neck of Virginia" than governing. He soon returned to England.

In 1682, rioting in the colony forced Culpeper to return. By the time he arrived, however, the riots were already quelled. After apparently misappropriating £9,500 from the treasury of the colony, he returned to England and the King was forced to dismiss him. During this tumultuous time, Culpeper's erratic behavior meant that he had to rely increasingly on his cousin and Virginia agent, Col. Nicholas Spencer. Spencer succeeded Culpeper as acting Governor following Culpeper's departure. Culpeper's descendants allowed Robert "King" Carter and other Virginians to manage the properties.

In 1736, legal claim to the land was finally established by Culpeper's grandson, Thomas Fairfax, 6th Lord Fairfax of Cameron, who became known in the colony as "Lord Fairfax", following a survey authorized by Governor William Gooch. The lands of Lord Fairfax and Northern Virginia were geographically defined as the land between the Rappahannock and Potomac rivers, and were officially called the "Northern Neck". In 1746, a back line was surveyed and established between the headwaters of the Potomac and Rappahannock rivers, defining the west end of the grants. According to documents held by the Handley Regional Library of the Winchester-Frederick County Historical Society, the grant of 5,282,000 acres (21,380 km^{2}) included 22 modern counties, including Northumberland, Lancaster, Westmoreland, Stafford, King George, Prince William, Fairfax, Loudoun, Fauquier, Rappahannock, Culpeper, Madison, Clarke, Warren, Page, Shenandoah, and Frederick counties in Virginia, and Hardy, Hampshire, Morgan, Berkeley, and Jefferson counties in West Virginia.

Lord Fairfax was a lifelong bachelor, and became one of the more well-known persons of the late colonial era. In 1742, the new county formed from Prince William County was named Fairfax County in his honor, one of several locations in Northern Virginia and West Virginia's Eastern Panhandle named after him. Lord Fairfax established his residence at his brother's home at "Belvoir" on the grounds of present-day Fort Belvoir in Fairfax County. He later built a hunting lodge named "Greenway Court", which was located near White Post in Clarke County near the Blue Ridge Mountains, and moved there. Around 1748, he met George Washington, who was then 16-years-old. Impressed with Washington's energy and talents, he employed him to survey his lands west of the Blue Ridge Mountains.

Lord Fairfax maintained neutrality as the American Revolutionary War began in 1775. Just a few weeks after the surrender of British Army troops under General Cornwallis at Yorktown, Fairfax died at his home at Greenway Court on December 9, 1781, at the age of 90. He was entombed on the east side of Christ Church in Winchester. While his plans for a large house at Greenway Court never materialized, and his stone lodge is now gone, a small limestone structure he built remains on the site in his honor.

=== Statehood and Civil War ===
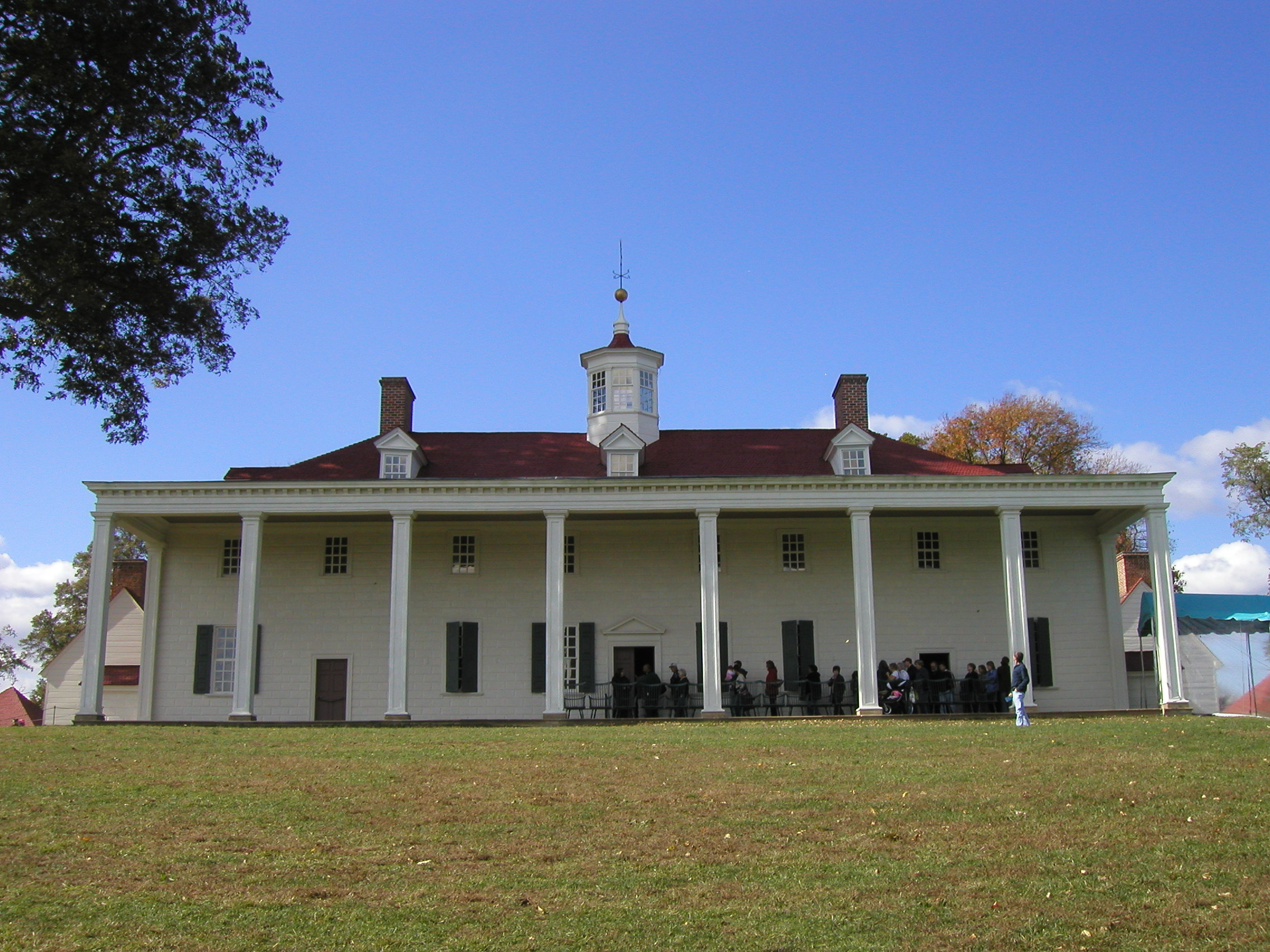
Mount Vernon, the plantation home of George Washington in Fairfax County

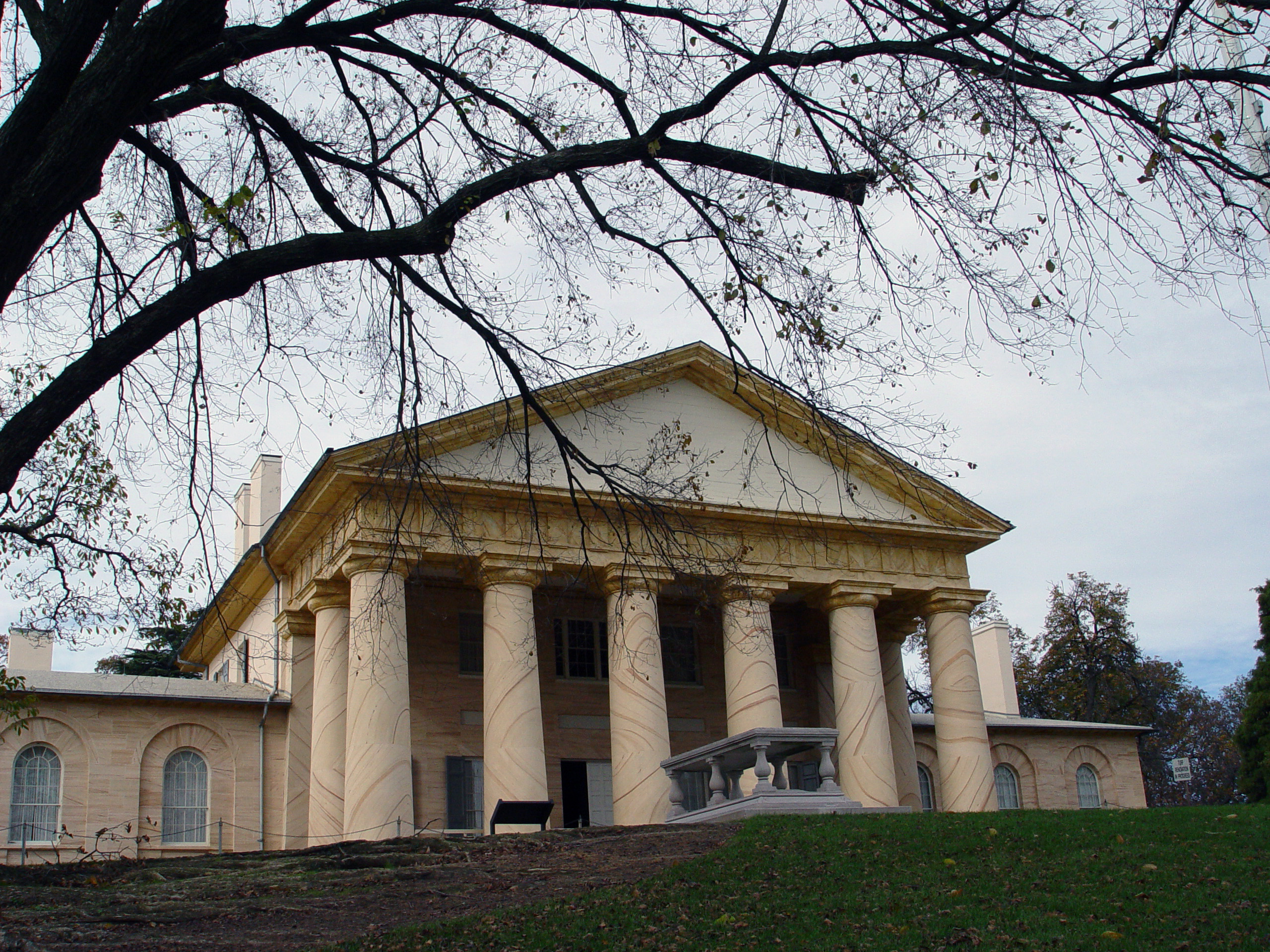
Arlington House, a mansion commissioned by a step-grandson of George Washington and last used as a residence by Robert E. Lee is now part of the grounds of Arlington National Cemetery

Following the American Revolutionary War, the Thirteen Colonies formed the United States of America, and Continental Army commander and Virginian George Washington became the new nation's first president. Prior to the Revolutionary War, Washington was a surveyor and developer of canals that were used for transportation. He was also a proponent of the bustling port city of Alexandria, located on the Potomac River below the fall line, not far from his plantation at Mount Vernon in Fairfax County.

During much of the colonial era and from 1790 to 1800, the nation's capital was in Philadelphia. In 1800, however, with Washington's guidance and support, the new federal city of present-day Washington, D.C. was laid out and established for the purpose of serving as the national capital. The region straddled the Potomac River and was located on a square of territory ceded to the federal government by Maryland and Virginia. Alexandria, a port city at the time, was on the eastern edge south of the river. On the outskirts on the northern side of the river, was Georgetown, another port city.

As the federal city grew, land in the portion contributed by Maryland proved best suited and adequate for early development. Not really part of the functioning federal city, citizens in Alexandria, who lacked voting input, were frustrated by the laws of the District's government. Slavery also arose as a contentious issue. In 1846, to mitigate these issues and as part of abolishing slave trading in the District, the U.S. Congress passed a bill retroceding to Virginia the area south of the Potomac River, which was then Alexandria County. That area now forms all of present-day Arlington County, which was renamed from Alexandria County in 1922, and a portion of the independent city of Alexandria.

Slavery, states' rights, and economic issues increasingly divided the northern and southern states during the first half of the 19th century, eventually leading to the American Civil War, which lasted from 1861 to 1865. Although Maryland was a slave state, it remained with the Union, while Virginia seceded and joined the newly formed Confederate States of America, whose capital was established at Richmond.

The U.S. Supreme Court has never issued a firm opinion on whether the retrocession of the Virginia portion of the District of Columbia was constitutional. In the 1875 case of Phillips v. Payne, the Supreme Court held that Virginia had de facto jurisdiction over the area returned by Congress in 1847, and dismissed the tax case brought by the plaintiff. The court, however, did not rule on the core constitutional matter of the retrocession. Writing the majority opinion, Justice Noah Swayne stated only that:

The plaintiff in error is estopped from raising the point which he seeks to have decided. He cannot, under the circumstances, vicariously raise a question, nor force upon the parties to the compact an issue which neither of them desires to make.

With barely 100 mi (160 km) separating the two capital cities, Northern Virginia found itself in the center of much of the conflict, which inflicted destruction and bloodshed. The Army of Northern Virginia was the primary army for the Confederate States of America in the east. Owing to the region's proximity to Washington, D.C., and the Potomac River, the armies of both sides frequently occupied and traversed Northern Virginia. As a result, several battles were fought in the area.

Northern Virginia was the operating area of John Singleton Mosby, a Confederate partisan, and several small skirmishes were fought throughout the region between his Rangers and Federal forces occupying Northern Virginia.

Following the end of the Civil War, the conflict remained popular among the region's residents, and many area schools, roads, and parks were named for Confederate generals and statesmen, including Jefferson Davis Highway, Washington-Lee High School, and others.

Virginia split during the American Civil War, as was foreshadowed by the April 17, 1861, Virginia Secession Convention. Fifty counties in the western, mountainous portion of the state were largely opposed to secession in 1861. This region broke away from the Confederacy in 1863 and entered the Union as a new state, West Virginia. Unlike the eastern part of the state, West Virginia did not have fertile lands tilled by slaves and was geographically separated from the state government in Richmond by the Appalachian Mountains. During this process, a provisional government of Virginia was headquartered in Alexandria, which was under Union control during the war. Arlington, Clarke, Fairfax, Frederick, Loudoun, Shenandoah, and Warren Counties voted in favor of Virginia remaining in the Union in 1861, but eventually broke away from the state.

As a result of West Virginia's formation, part of Lord Fairfax's colonial land grant, which defined Northern Virginia, was ceded in the establishment of that state in 1863. Now known as the Eastern Panhandle of West Virginia, the area includes Berkeley County and Jefferson County in West Virginia.

=== 20th century ===
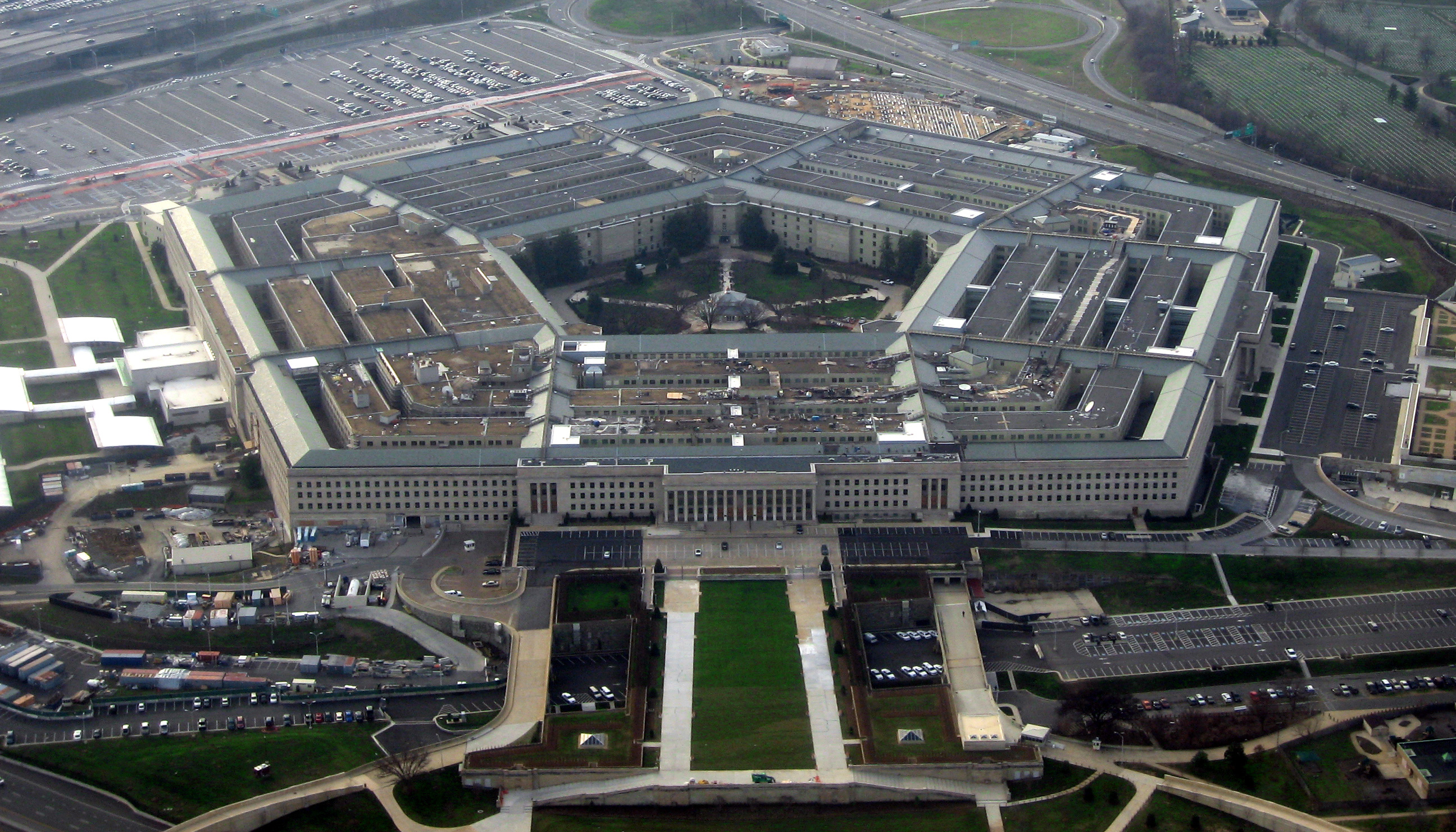
The Pentagon, headquarters of the Department of Defense in Arlington County

The Department of Defense's increasing reliance on information technology companies during the Cold War was influential in launching the modern Northern Virginia economy and spurred urban development throughout the region. After end of the Cold War in 1991, prosperity continued in the region as it positioned itself as the "Silicon Valley" of the Eastern United States. The Internet was first commercialized in Northern Virginia, which served as the headquarters of many of the first Internet service providers.

The first major interconnection point of the Internet, MAE-East, was established in the 1990s in Ashburn after Virginia-area network provider operators decided to connect their networks. This infrastructure legacy is ongoing, as data center operators continue to expand near these facilities.

=== 21st century ===
In early 2001, local Internet company AOL bought Time Warner, the world's largest traditional media company, near the end of the dot-com bubble era. After the Internet bubble burst, however, Northern Virginia office vacancy rates increased from two percent in 2000 to 20 percent in 2002. After 2002, vacancy rates improved, falling below 10 percent as defense spending increased following the September 11 attacks. The subsequent Afghanistan and Iraq wars also contributed to the region's growth, as the federal government increased its contracting with private defense firms.

== Regional organizations ==
=== Northern Virginia Regional Commission ===
The Northern Virginia Regional Commission (NVRC) is a regional government that represents a regional council of thirteen member Northern Virginia local governments. These local governments include the counties of Arlington, Fairfax, Loudoun, and Prince William. The local governments include the incorporated cities of Alexandria, Fairfax, Falls Church, Manassas, and Manassas Park. The local governments also include the incorporated towns of Dumfries, Herndon, Leesburg, and Vienna. NVRC's chief roles and functions are providing information, performing professional and technical services for its members, and serving as a mechanism for regional coordination regarding the environment, transportation, affordable housing, community planning, military, and human services. Programs and projects address a wide array of local government interests.

According to Virginia's Regional Cooperation Act, NVRC is a political subdivision. The region is technically referred to as Virginia's planning district #8. The commission was established pursuant to Articles 1 and 2, Chapter 34, of the Acts of the Virginia General Assembly of 1968, subsequently revised and reenacted as the Regional Cooperation Act. Any incorporated county, city, or town in Northern Virginia with a population exceeding 3,500 that adopts NVRC's charter agreement is eligible to become a member of the commission.

=== Metropolitan Washington Council of Governments ===
Northern Virginia constitutes a considerable portion of the population and number of jurisdictions that comprise the Metropolitan Washington Council of Governments (MWCOG). Founded in 1957, MWCOG is a regional organization of 22 Washington-area local governments, as well as area members of the Maryland and Virginia state legislatures, the U.S. Senate, and the U.S. House of Representatives. MWCOG provides a forum for discussion and the development of regional responses to issues regarding the environment, transportation, public safety, homeland security, affordable housing, community planning, and economic development.

The National Capital Region Transportation Planning Board, a component of MWCOG, is the federally designated metropolitan planning organization for the metropolitan Washington area, including Northern Virginia.

== Demographics ==
Historical population
Census	Pop.	Note	%±
1900	188,919		—
1910	194,731		3.1%
1920	206,504		6.0%
1930	229,205		11.0%
1940	298,588		30.3%
1950	488,945		63.8%
1960	788,162		61.2%
1970	1,118,064		41.9%
1980	1,357,387		21.4%
1990	1,805,091		33.0%
2000	2,253,251		24.8%
2010	2,794,957		24.0%
2020	3,197,076		14.4%
2023 (est.)	3,257,133		1.9%
1900–2020

As of April 2020 there were 3,197,076 people in Northern Virginia; approximately 37 percent of the state's population.

These population counts include all counties within Virginia that are part of the Washington-Arlington-Alexandria, DC-VA-MD-WV Metropolitan Statistical Area or the Washington-Baltimore-Arlington, DC-MD-VA-WV-PA Combined Statistical Area as defined by the U.S. Office of Management and Budget within the Executive Office of the President of the United States.

Of the 3,159,639 people in Northern Virginia in the 2019 estimates, 2,776,960 lived in "central" counties, or those counties and equivalent entities as delineated by the U.S. Office of Management and Budget as forming part of the urban core of the Washington Metropolitan Statistical Area. These counties include Arlington, Fairfax, Fauquier, Loudoun, Prince William, Stafford and the independent cities of Alexandria, Fairfax, Falls Church, Manassas, Manassas Park and Fredericksburg.

An additional 390,679 people lived in counties of the Washington Metropolitan Statistical Area or the Baltimore-Washington Combined Statistical Area not considered "central." These counties, largely considered exurban or undergoing suburban change, include Clarke, Culpeper, Frederick, Madison, Rappahannock, Spotsylvania, Warren, and the independent city of Winchester.

In addition, there are counties outside of the Washington Metropolitan Area that under more broad definitions are referred to as being part of Northern Virginia. The University of Virginia Weldon Cooper Center for Public Service categorizes King George County as part of Northern Virginia, though the county was removed from the Washington Metropolitan Area in 2003. King George County and Orange County also include areas, such as Lake of the Woods, where the cross-commuting interchange with the Washington Metropolitan Area is high enough to merit inclusion in the Metropolitan Area, although more far-flung parts of these counties still cause the county-wide commuter interchange to fall below the threshold for inclusion in the Washington Metropolitan Area or Washington-Baltimore Combined Statistical Area. The demographic figures above do not include population counts for these two counties.

=== Racial and ethnic composition ===
The 2020 U.S. census resulted in the following racial and ethnic composition for Northern Virginia:

Jurisdiction	Population (2020 Census)	White alone, not Hispanic or Latino	Hispanic or Latino	Black or African American alone	Asian alone	American Indian and Alaska Native alone	Native Hawaiian and Other Pacific Islander alone	Two or More Races
City of Alexandria	159,467	51.9%	16.7%	21.8%	5.9%	0.2%	0.0%	5.3%
Arlington County	238,643	61.4%	15.6%	9.7%	11.0%	0.6%	0.1%	3.6%
Clarke County	14,783	85.3%	6.4%	4.7%	1.4%	0.7%	0.1%	2.5%
Culpeper County	52,552	69.8%	11.6%	14.6%	1.7%	0.8%	0.2%	3.3%
City of Fairfax	24,146	56.2%	17.2%	4.9%	17.2%	0.1%	0.0%	5.1%
Fairfax County	1,150,309	50.0%	16.5%	10.6%	20.1%	0.5%	0.1%	3.9%
City of Falls Church	14,658	71.2%	10.6%	4.8%	10.0%	0.6%	0.1%	4.7%
Fauquier County	72,972	79.0%	9.2%	7.8%	1.7%	0.5%	0.1%	2.8%
Frederick County	91,419	82.3%	9.3%	4.7%	1.8%	0.5%	0.1%	2.4%
City of Fredericksburg	27,982	54.3%	12.4%	21.2%	4.7%	0.3%	0.1%	5.8%
Loudoun County	420,959	54.8%	13.9%	8.1%	20.3%	0.5%	0.1%	3.9%
Madison County	13,837	84.3%	3.2%	9.3%	0.6%	0.3%	0.0%	2.9%
City of Manassas	42,772	39.5%	38.1%	15.4%	6.3%	1.4%	0.2%	3.6%
City of Manassas Park	17,219	31.2%	41.0%	15.6%	11.5%	1.6%	0.3%	3.5%
Prince William County	482,204	41.5%	24.5%	22.2%	9.4%	1.1%	0.2%	4.7%
Rappahannock County	7,348	88.3%	4.4%	4.2%	1.0%	0.4%	0.1%	2.0%
Spotsylvania County	140,032	66.6%	10.7%	17.5%	2.8%	0.5%	0.2%	3.6%
Stafford County	156,927	59.3%	14.2%	20.0%	3.6%	0.8%	0.2%	4.5%
Warren County	40,727	86.0%	5.3%	5.0%	1.3%	0.6%	0.1%	2.6%
City of Winchester	28,120	65.7%	18.3%	11.3%	2.7%	0.9%	0.1%	3.6%

Northern Virginia as a whole is 51.2% White, 17.4% Hispanic, 16.3% Asian, 14.1% Black, and 2.4% Other.

=== Background ===
Demographics in Northern Virginia's five largest jurisdictions
Household income	No. VA	U.S.
($200k+)	13.6%	3.7%
$100k+	46.1%	19.0%
$75k-100k	15.1%	12.1%
$50k-75k	16.3%	18.8%
$25k-50k	14.2%	25.6%
$25k or less	8.4%	24.5%
Race	No. VA	U.S.
White	67.2%	74.1%
Black or African American	11.6%	12.4%
Asian	12.5%	4.3%
(Hispanic or Latino)	13.9%	N/A
Some other race	N/A	6.2%
Two or more races	2.4%	2.1%
Educational attainment	No. VA	U.S.
(Graduate/professional)	25.2%	9.9%
Bachelor's or higher	55.5%	27.0%
Associate's	5.7%	7.4%
Some college	14.8%	19.5%
High school/equivalent	15.8%	30.2%
Less than high school	8.1%	15.9%

Northern Virginia is home to people from diverse backgrounds, with significant numbers of Korean Americans, Vietnamese Americans, Bangladeshi Americans, Chinese Americans, Filipino Americans, Russian Americans, Arab Americans, Palestinian Americans, Uzbek Americans, Afghan Americans, Ethiopian Americans, Indian Americans, Iranian Americans, Thai Americans, and Pakistani Americans. Annandale, Centreville, Chantilly, and Fairfax City have very large Korean American communities. Falls Church has a large Vietnamese American community, and the region is home to a small Tibetan American community.

There is a sizable Hispanic population, primarily consisting of Salvadorans, Peruvians, Puerto Ricans, Cubans, Bolivians, Mexicans, and Colombians. Arlington is the center of the largest Bolivian community in North America (mostly immigrants from Cochabamba). Many of these immigrants work in transportation-related fields, small businesses, hospitality, vending, gardening, construction, and cleaning.

Of those born in the U.S. and living in Northern Virginia's four largest counties, their place of birth by census region is 60.5 percent from the South, 21.0 percent from the Northeast, 11.5 percent from the Midwest, and 7.0 percent from the West. 33.7 percent were born in Virginia, which is categorized as part of the Southern United States along with neighboring Maryland and Washington, D.C., by the Census Bureau.

=== Educational attainment ===
The core Northern Virginia jurisdictions of Alexandria, Arlington, Fairfax, Loudoun, and Prince William comprising a total population of 1,973,513 is highly educated, with 55.5 percent of its population 25 years or older holding a bachelor's degree or higher. This is comparable to Seattle, the most educated large city in the U.S., with 53.4 percent of residents having at least a bachelor's degree. The number of graduate/professional degree holders in Arlington is relatively high at 34.3 percent, nearly quadruple the rate of the U.S. population as a whole.

=== Affluence ===
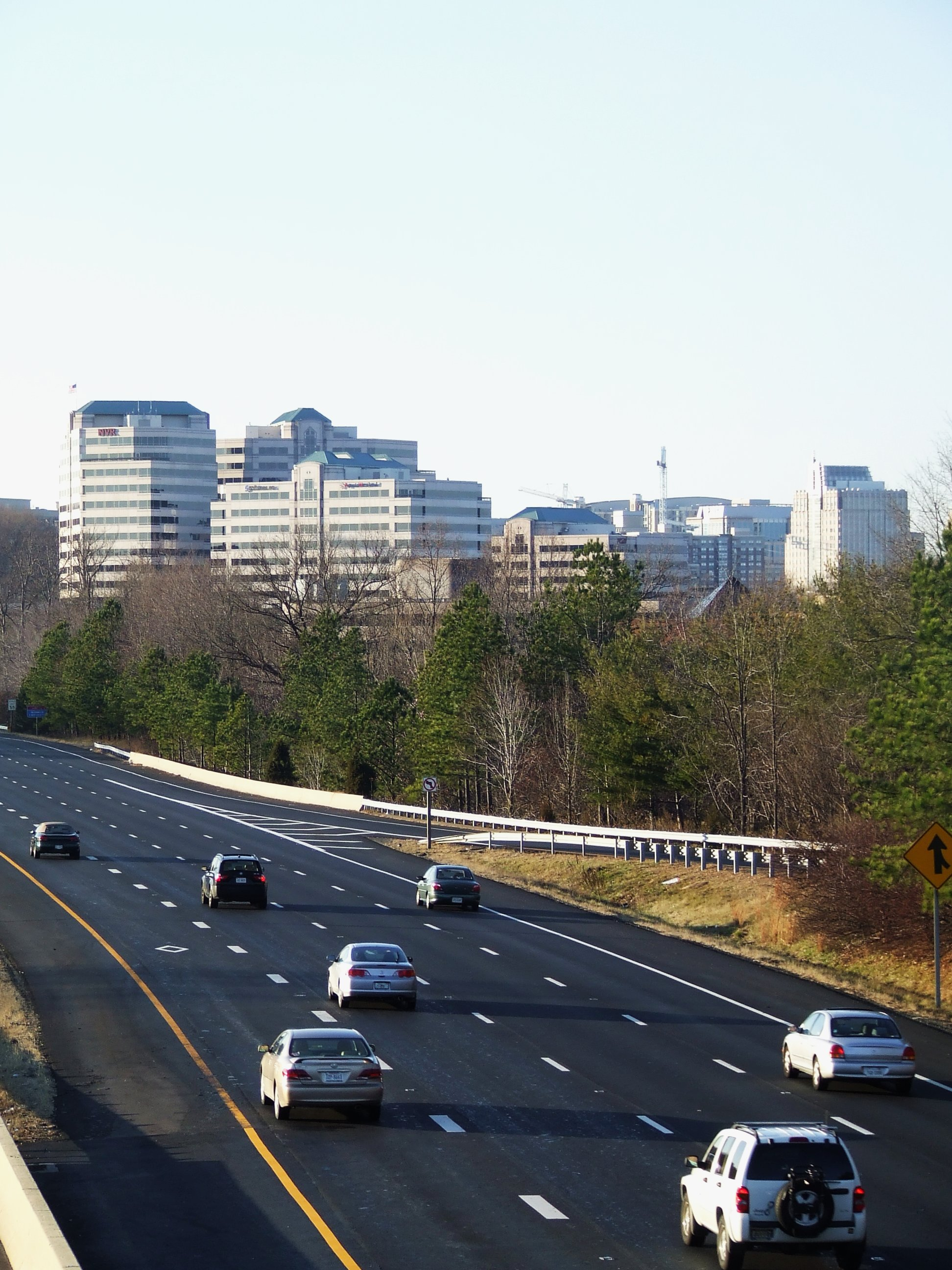
Reston, a planned community, seen from the Dulles Toll Road, in December 2006

The region is known in Virginia and the Washington metropolitan area for its relative affluence. Stafford County in Northern Virginia is one of the seven counties in the nation where black households make more than white households. Among large cities or counties in the nation with median household incomes in excess of $100,000, the top two cities, which comprise over half the region's population, are in Northern Virginia.

Northern Virginia also has one of the highest costs of living in the nation, making the actual purchasing power of these households considerably less than in other less affluent areas. According to Nielsen Claritas, Loudoun County and Arlington County have the highest concentration of 25- to 34-year-olds with incomes of $100,000+ in the nation.

In 1988, Tysons Galleria, a large shopping mall, opened across Virginia Route 123 from Tysons Corner Center with high-end department stores Neiman Marcus and Saks Fifth Avenue, hoping to become the Washington area's upscale shopping destination. The mall had trouble with sales and attracting high-end boutiques well into the 1990s and faced competition from Fairfax Square, which opened nearby in 1990 with the largest Tiffany & Co. boutique outside of New York City. Following a 1997 renovation, Tysons Galleria was able to attract high-end stores. In 2002, National Geographic described it as "the Rodeo Drive of the East Coast."

In 2008, luxury home service Sotheby's International Realty, which had three offices in Virginia serving the rest of the state, and two in Washington, D.C., opened a new office in McLean to sell high-end real estate in Northern Virginia.

=== Crime ===
According to the "Crime in Virginia 2021" report, published by the Department of State Police, Northern Virginia had homicide rates below the state average:

Jurisdiction	Population (2020 Census)	Homicides (2020)	Homicide Rate (per 100,000)	Homicides (2021)	Homicide Rate (per 100,000)
Alexandria city	159,467	3	1.88	2	1.25
Arlington County	238,643	3	1.26	0	0.00
Clarke County	14,783	0	0.00	0	0.00
Culpeper County	52,552	0	0.00	0	0.00
Fairfax city	24,146	0	0.00	0	0.00
Fairfax County	1,150,309	16	1.39	26	2.26
Falls Church city	14,658	1	6.82	0	0.00
Fauquier County	72,972	3	4.11	3	4.11
Frederick County	91,419	3	3.28	2	2.19
Fredericksburg city	27,982	3	10.72	3	10.72
Loudoun County	420,959	1	0.24	3	0.71
Madison County	13,837	1	7.23	1	7.23
Manassas city	42,772	1	2.34	1	2.34
Manassas Park city	17,219	0	0.00	0	0.00
Prince William County	482,204	7	1.45	10	2.07
Rappahannock County	7,348	0	0.00	0	0.00
Spotsylvania County	140,032	5	3.57	3	2.14
Stafford County	156,927	2	1.27	4	2.55
Warren County	40,727	0	0.00	0	0.00
Winchester city	28,120	2	7.11	1	3.56
REGION TOTAL	3,197,076	51	1.60	59	1.85

A 2009 report by the Northern Virginia Regional Gang Task Force suggests that anti-gang measures and crackdowns on illegal immigrants by local jurisdictions are driving gang members out of Northern Virginia and into more immigrant-friendly locales in Maryland, Washington, D.C., and the rest of Virginia. The violent crime rate in Northern Virginia fell 17 percent from 2003 to 2008. Fairfax County has the lowest crime rate in the Washington metropolitan area, and the lowest crime rate amongst the 50 largest jurisdictions of the United States.

While the region has extremely low violent crime rates, it is an emerging hub for teen sex trafficking, with regional gangs finding it more profitable than selling drugs or weapons.

== Economy ==
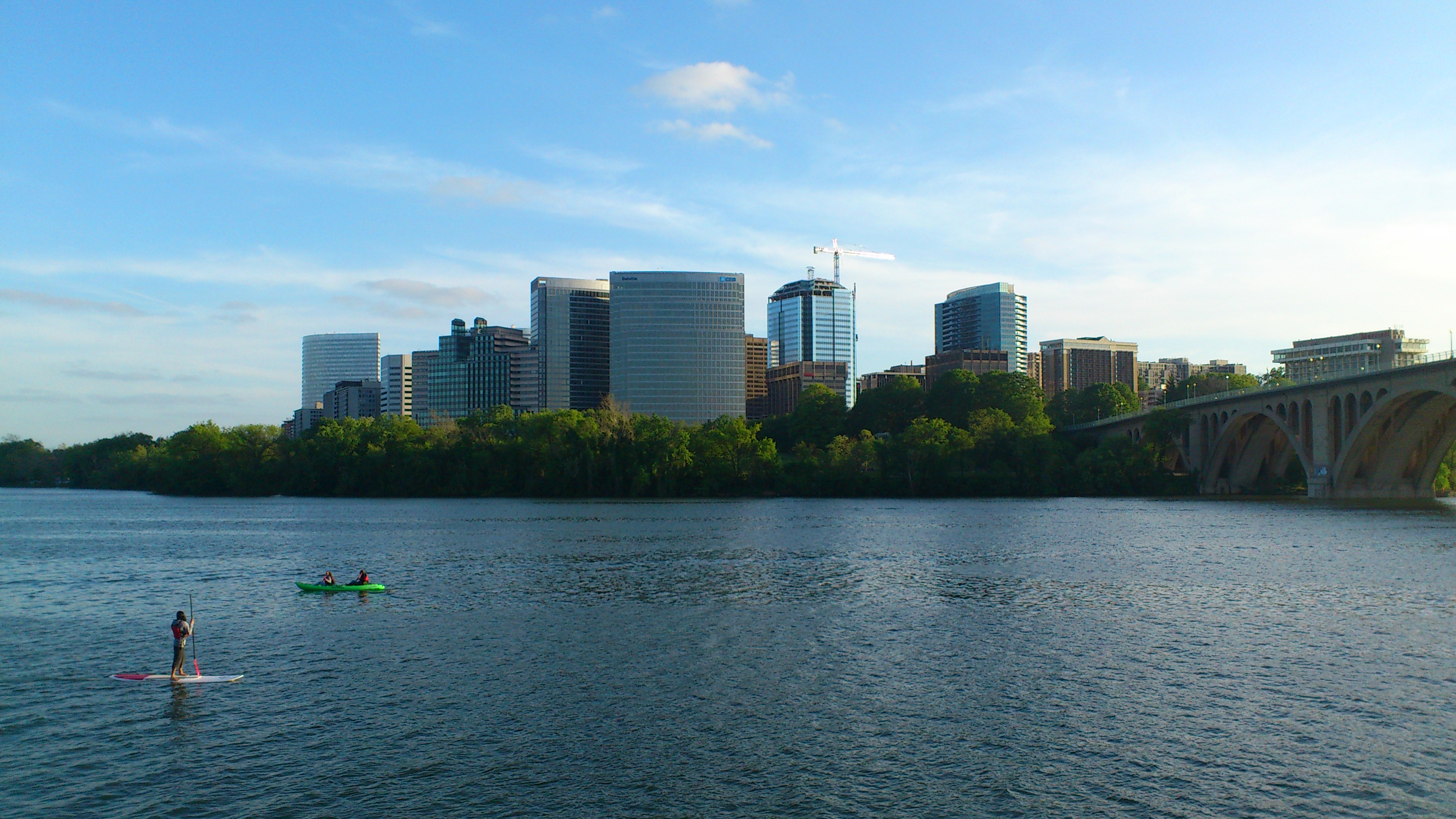
Arlington, home to some of the tallest high rises in the Washington metropolitan area

Former Virginia Governor Bob McDonnell described Northern Virginia as "the economic engine of the state" during a January 2010 Northern Virginia Technology Council address.

As of 2007 the Northern Virginia office submarkets contain 172,000,000 sq ft (16,000,000 m^{2}) of office space, 33 percent more than those in Washington, D.C., and 55 percent more than those in its Maryland suburbs. 8,000,000 sq ft (740,000 m^{2}) of office space is under construction in Northern Virginia. 60 percent of the construction is occurring in the Dulles Corridor submarket.

As of September 2008, the unemployment rate in Northern Virginia was 3.2 percent, about half the national average, and the lowest of any metropolitan area. While the U.S. as a whole had negative job growth between September 2007 to September 2008, Northern Virginia gained 12,800 jobs, representing half of Virginia's new jobs. As of July 2010, the unemployment rate of the region was 5.2 percent.As of December 2025, the unemployment rate was 3.3 percent.

In the mid-2000s, Fairfax County was one of few places in the nation that attracted more creative-class workers than it created.

=== Internet ===
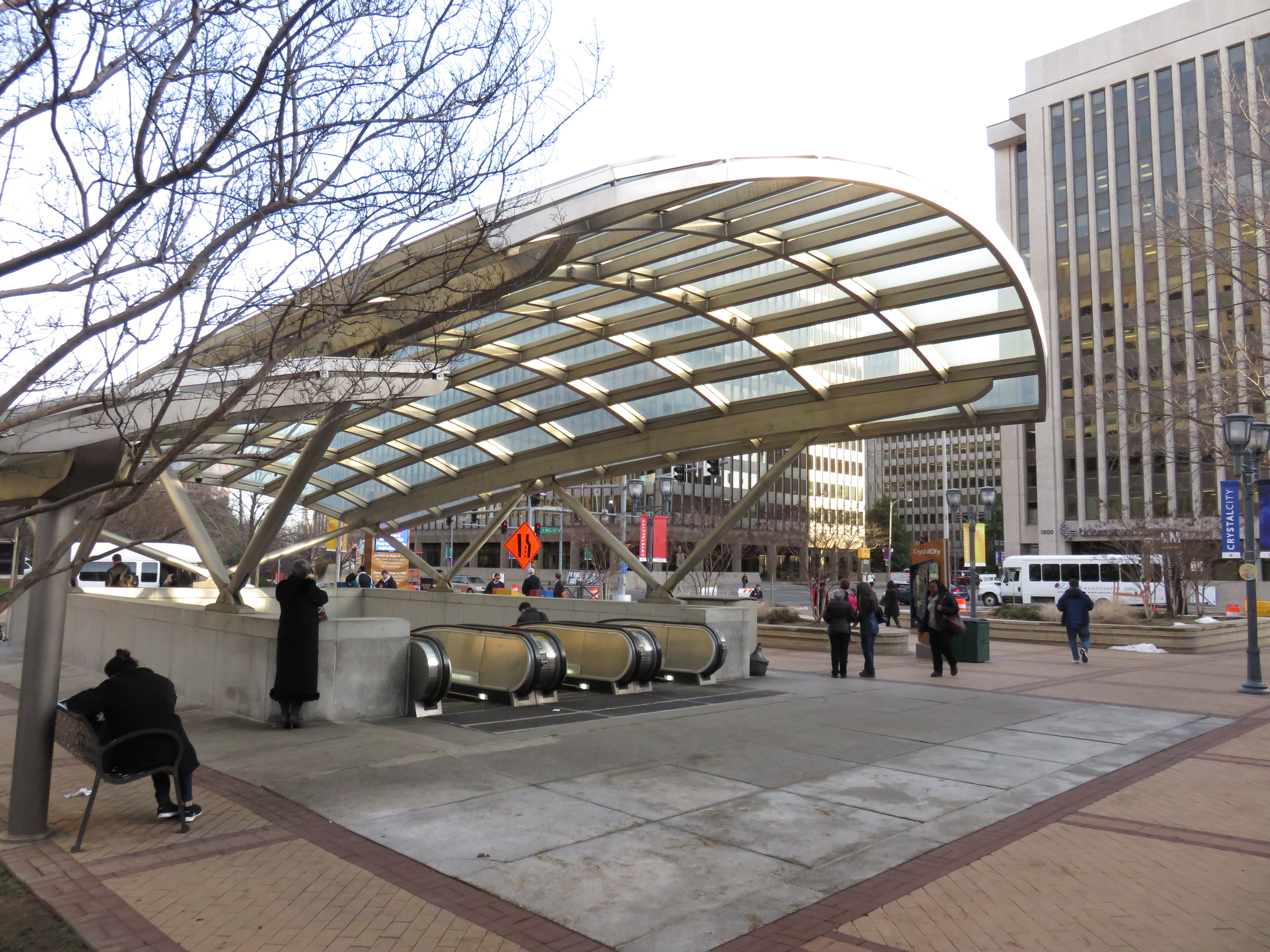
Crystal City in Arlington County was selected as a location for Amazon's Amazon HQ2 real estate search. The regional headquarters complex will include up to 6,000,000 sq ft (557,400 m^{2}), rivaling the nearby Pentagon.

Northern Virginia is home to the largest data center market in the world by capacity, especially in Loudoun County, with more than quadruple that of London, at 13% of global capacity, or around 4,140 megawatts. A popular myth is that 70% of all data traffic goes through Northern Virginia, though it is not true. Loudoun County expects to have 6,500,000 sq ft (600,000 m^{2}) of data center space by 2021. By 2012, Dominion Energy expects that 10 percent of all electricity it sends to Northern Virginia will be used by the region's data centers alone. Accenture estimates that 70 percent of Amazon Elastic Compute Cloud servers are located in their Northern Virginia zone. A 2015–16 estimate by Greenpeace puts Amazon's current and upcoming power capacity in Northern Virginia at over 1 gigawatt.

=== Federal government ===
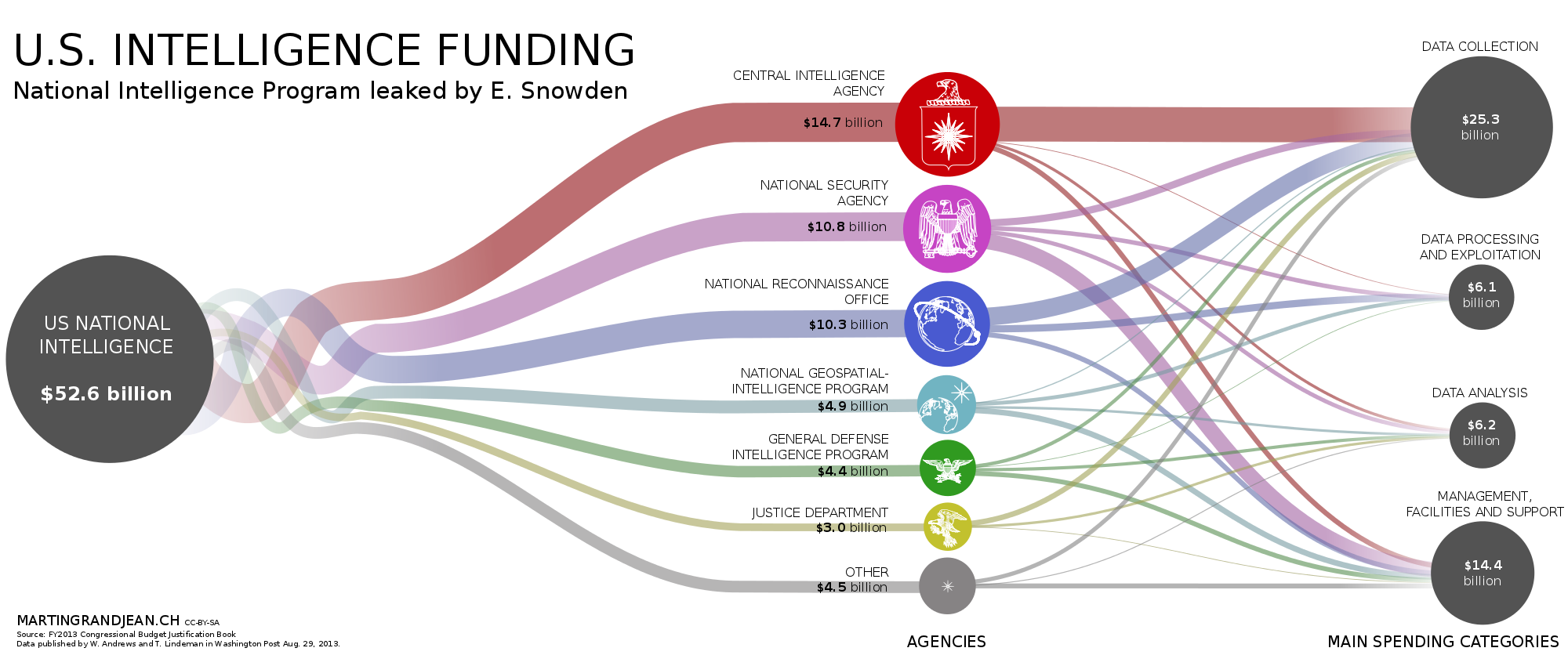
The region is home to three of the four largest U.S. intelligence agencies by budget.

The federal government is a major employer in Northern Virginia, which is home to numerous government agencies, including the headquarters of the Central Intelligence Agency and the Pentagon, headquarters of the Department of Defense. The area also includes Fort Myer, Fort Belvoir, Marine Corps Base Quantico, the FBI Academy, DEA Academy, Naval Criminal Investigative Service, the U.S. Patent and Trademark Office, and U.S. Geological Survey.

Government contracting is an important part of the region's economy. Arlington alone is home to over 600 federal contractors and has the highest weekly wages of any major jurisdiction in the Washington metropolitan area.

The following government agencies have either 10,000+ employees or a $10+ billion budget:

- Central Intelligence Agency (CIA)
- Defense Logistics Agency (DLA)
- Department of Defense (DOD)
- Drug Enforcement Administration (DEA)
- National Geospatial-Intelligence Agency (NGA)
- National Reconnaissance Office (NRO)
- Transportation Security Administration (TSA)
- United States Patent and Trademark Office (USPTO)
- United States Fish and Wildlife Service (FWS)

Other federal agencies in Northern Virginia include:

- DARPA
- National Science Foundation (NSF)
- Office of the Director of National Intelligence (ODNI)

=== Notable companies ===
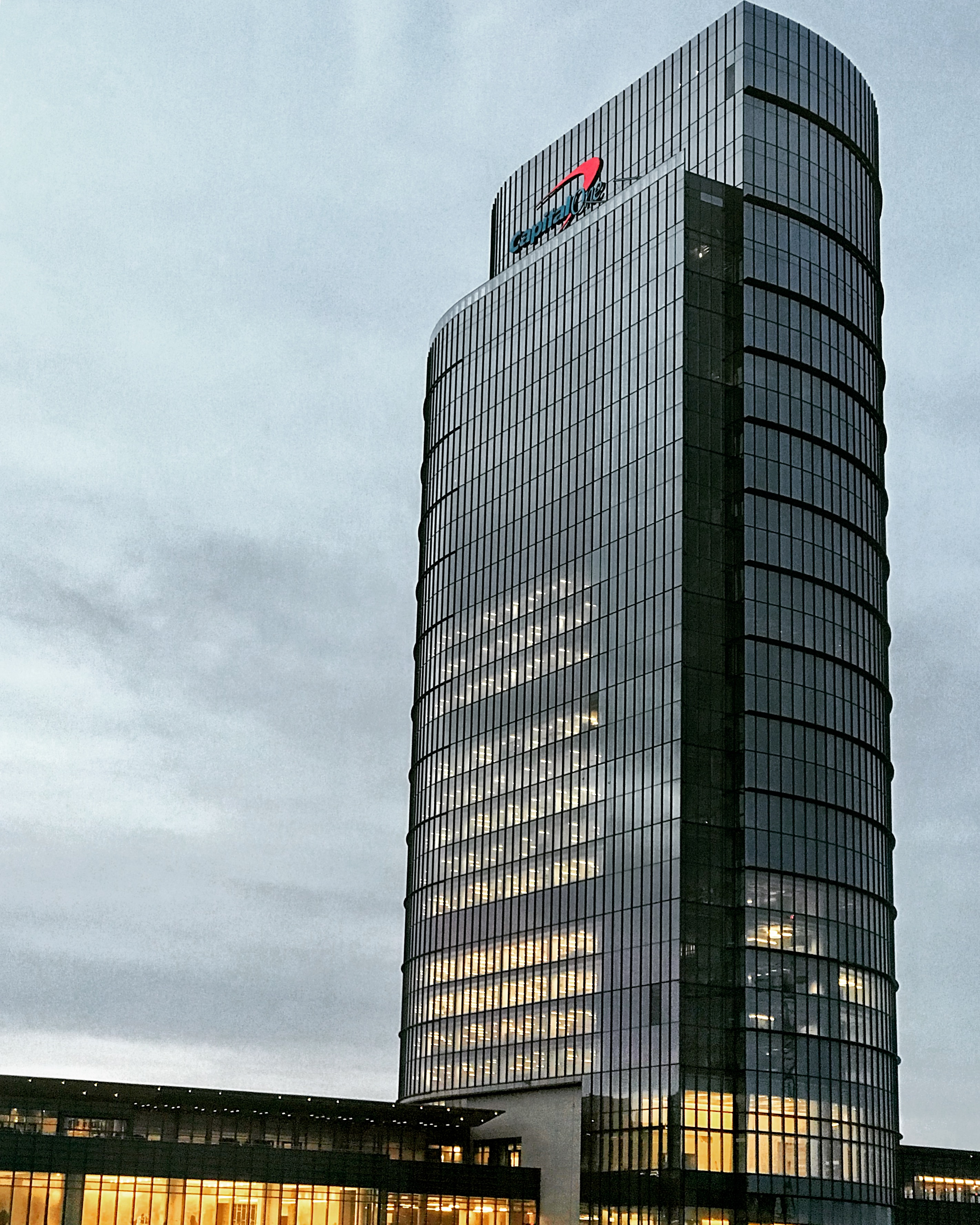
Capital One Tower in Tysons, the tallest building in the Washington metropolitan area and a centerpiece of the 5,000,000 sq ft (464,500 m^{2}) headquarters campus for Capital One

Largest public companies (Fortune 500 2025)
Company	Industry	Headquarters	National rank
AES Corporation	Utilities: Gas and Electric	Arlington, Virginia	343
Beacon Roofing Supply	Wholesalers: Diversified	Herndon, Virginia	421
Boeing	Aerospace and Defense	Crystal City, Virginia	63
Booz Allen Hamilton	Information Technology Services	McLean, Virginia	398
CACI International	Information Technology Services	Reston, Virginia	484
Capital One Financial	Commercial Banks	Tysons, Virginia	82
DXC Technology	Information Technology Services	Ashburn, Virginia	315
Freddie Mac	Diversified Financials	Tysons, Virginia	38
General Dynamics	Aerospace and Defense	Reston, Virginia	96
Hilton Worldwide	Hospitality	Tysons, Virginia	380
Leidos	Information Technology Services	Reston, Virginia	250
Northrop Grumman	Aerospace and Defense	Falls Church, Virginia	110
NVR, Inc.	Homebuilders	Reston, Virginia	396
RTX	Aerospace and Defense	Arlington, Virginia	54
Science Applications	Information Technology Services	Reston, Virginia	496

Largest private companies (Forbes America's Largest Private Companies 2021)
Company	Industry	Headquarters	National rank
Bechtel	Construction	Reston, Virginia	15
Carahsoft	Information Technology Services	Reston, Virginia	44
Mars	Food and Drink	McLean, Virginia	4

Verisign, the manager of the .com and .net top-level domains, is based in the region. Major companies formerly headquartered in the region include AOL, Mobil, Nextel/Sprint, PSINet, Sallie Mae, MCI Communications, Transurban, and UUNET.

== Attractions ==
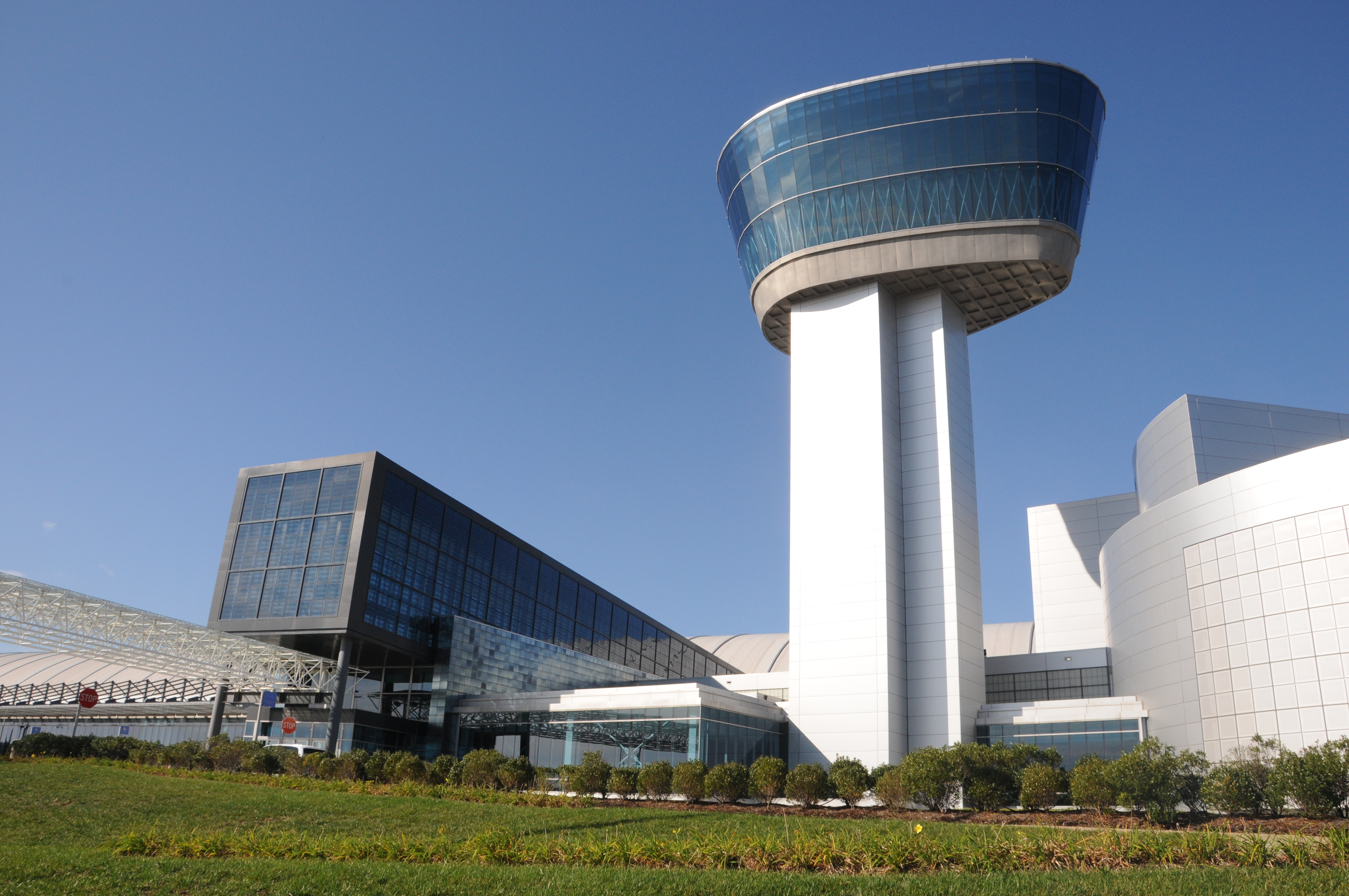
The Steven F. Udvar-Hazy Center, part of the National Air and Space Museum at Dulles International Airport

The region's large shopping malls, such as Potomac Mills and Tysons Corner Center, attract many visitors, as do the region's Civil War battlefields, which include the sites of both the First and Second Battle of Bull Run in Manassas and the Battle of Fredericksburg in Fredericksburg. Old Town Alexandria is known for its historic churches, townhouses, restaurants, gift shops, artist studios, and cruise boats.

The waterfront and outdoor recreational amenities such as biking and running trails, including the Washington and Old Dominion Rail Trail that leads from Alexandria to the foothills of the Blue Ridge, the Mount Vernon Trail and trails along various stream beds, whitewater and sea kayaking, and rock climbing areas along the Potomac River, various parks, Great Falls Park, and historic Mount Vernon, which opened a new visitor center in 2006. The Government Island park and quarry in Stafford County has views of the Potomac River. Aquia Creek was the source for many of the building materials for the White House, and U.S. Capitol. Also in Stafford County are historic places, including George Washington's boyhood home, Ferry Farm,, the Civil War headquarters and plantation Chatham Manor, and Gari Melchers Home & Studio.

Arlington National Cemetery and the Steven F. Udvar-Hazy Center, an annex of the National Air and Space Museum, which includes exhibits that cannot be housed at the main museum in Washington, D.C., due to space constraints. Concerts and other live shows are held at the Wolf Trap National Park for the Performing Arts in Wolf Trap.

== Politics ==
Presidential elections results

Presidential elections results
Year	Republican	Democratic	Third parties
2024	37.2% 614,910	59.8% 989,347	3.1% 50,583
2020	34.3% 567,659	63.7% 1,053,815	2.1% 33,812
2016	34.8% 505,659	58.6% 851,505	6.7% 96,693
2012	42.1% 575,477	56.4% 771,396	1.5% 20,330
2008	41.2% 530,038	57.8% 743,193	1.0% 12,920
2004	48.9% 539,992	50.3% 554,592	0.8% 9,102
2000	49.6% 459,322	46.7% 432,189	3.7% 34,276
1996	47.4% 367,540	46.5% 360,492	6.1% 47,413

=== Background ===
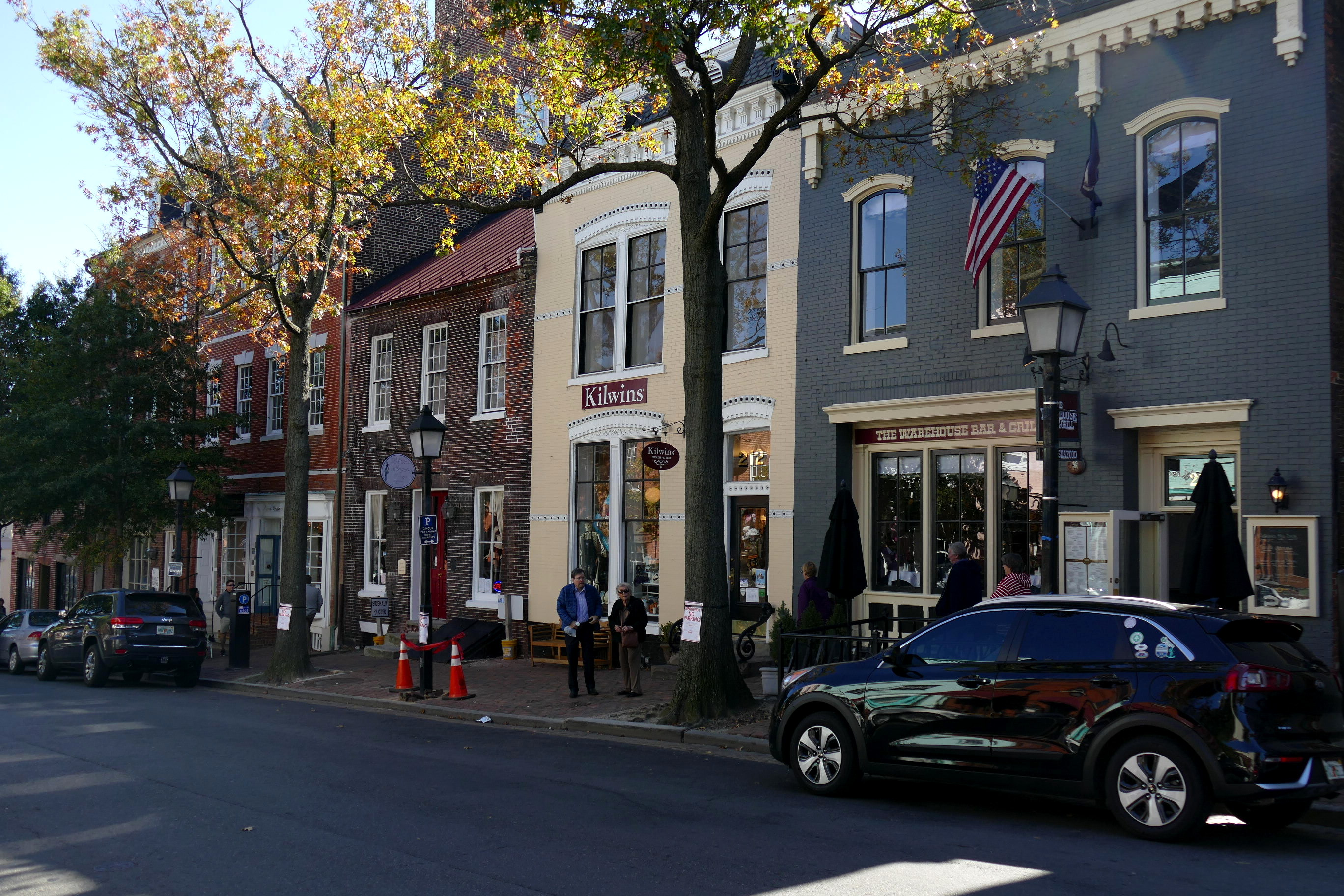
Alexandria, Virginia, the adopted hometown of George Washington

From the mid-1880s through the mid-1960s, Virginia politics were dominated by Conservative Democrats. After World War I, under the leadership of Harry Flood Byrd, who became Governor of Virginia and later a U.S. senator, the group became known as the Byrd Organization. With a power base in a network of the constitutional officers of most of Virginia's counties, they controlled Virginia's state government. The Byrd Organization largely followed conservative and anti-debt principles espoused by Byrd, who grew up in a rural setting during the fiscally stressed era following Reconstruction. Although a member of the Democratic Party and an initial supporter of President Franklin D. Roosevelt, Senator Byrd became a bitter opponent of the New Deal and related national policies, particularly those involving fiscal and social issues. He became Virginia's senior senator after the death of Senator Carter Glass of Lynchburg in 1946.

Following World War II, Virginia's suburban areas, including Northern Virginia, Richmond, and Hampton Roads, grew in size and diversity. People of the emerging middle class were increasingly less willing to accept the rural focus of the General Assembly, nor Byrd's extreme positions on public debt and social issues. The latter was nowhere more graphically illustrated than with Byrd's violent opposition to racial integration of the state's public schools. His leadership in the failed policy of Massive Resistance to racial desegregation of the public schools and efforts to circumvent related rulings of the United States Supreme Court ultimately caused closure of some public schools in the state and alienated many middle-class voters. The Byrd Organization had never been strong in Virginia's independent cities, and beginning in the 1960s, city and suburban factions increasingly supported efforts to make broad changes in Virginia. In this climate, the Republican Party of Virginia began making inroads.

Rulings by both state and federal courts that "Massive Resistance" was unconstitutional and a move to compliance with the court orders in early 1959 by Governor J. Lindsay Almond, and the General Assembly could be described as marking the Byrd Organization's "last stand", although the remnants of the Organization continued to wield power for a few years longer.

When Senator Byrd resigned in 1965, he was replaced by his son Harry F. Byrd Jr. in the U.S. Senate. In 1969, however, the 80-year domination of Virginia politics by the Byrds ended with the election of Linwood Holton, a conservative Democrat who subsequently became a Republican and was reelected in 1973, representing the first Republican governor had been elected in the 20th century.

During the last quarter of the 20th century, Virginia's Republicans gained ground against the Democrats. Republican John Warner from Northern Virginia gained one of the seats in the U.S. Senate in 1978. After longtime state senator L. Douglas Wilder became governor in 1989, the first African American to be elected a governor in the United States, Republicans subsequently gained control of the Governor's mansion after the 1993 election. Republicans finally gained control of the General Assembly in the 1999 elections.

For a number of years, the recurring Republican theme was to reduce waste in state government and taxes. However, this seemed to reach a peak during the administration of Jim Gilmore, with a move to repeal an unpopular car tax accompanied by a failure to provide promised replacement funds to the counties, cities and towns. Subsequently, two Democrats were elected consecutively as governor, and control in the General Assembly shifted back to a more bipartisan balance of power. As governor, both Mark Warner and Tim Kaine were confronted with stabilizing state economics and dealing with a deteriorating transportation funding situation partially caused by the state's failure to index state fuel taxes to inflation, with a "cents per gallon" tax rate unchanged since the administration of Democratic Governor Gerald Baliles in 1986.

=== 21st century politics ===
Map of the 2020 United States presidential election in Virginia

Map of the 2024 United States presidential election in Virginia

Virginia Congressional Districts as of 2023

In the 21st century, Northern Virginia is known for becoming increasingly favorable to the Democratic Party at both the state and national level. Fairfax County supported John Kerry in the 2004 presidential election, and also voted heavily for Barack Obama in the 2008 presidential election, the first time a Democratic candidate for president carried the Commonwealth of Virginia since Lyndon Johnson in 1964. The area also voted for Democrats Jim Webb in 2006 for U.S. Senate, Tim Kaine in 2005 for governor, and Mark Warner in 2001 for governor. In these three races for statewide office, the margins tallied in Northern Virginia provided the Democratic candidate with a winning margin of victory.

Democrat Jim Webb defeated incumbent Senator George Allen by the slim margin of 49.6 to 49.2 percent in 2006. However, that margin increased to 58.1 to 40.7 percent in favor of the Democratic challenger in the counties and cities of Northern Virginia, whereas Webb ran behind Allen somewhat, 46.1 to 52.7 percent, in the remainder of the commonwealth. Webb carried Fairfax County, Prince William County, and Loudoun County, as well as the more urban areas of Arlington, Alexandria, and Falls Church. Allen's sole wins in Northern Virginia were the cities of Manassas and Manassas Park, winning the latter two only by the narrow margins of 3.54 and 2.38 percent, respectively.

In the 2004 presidential election, 53 percent of Northern Virginia voters voted for John Kerry, the Democratic candidate and 46 percent voted for George W. Bush, the Republican candidate. This contrasted with the rest of Virginia, which gave 43 percent to Kerry and 56 percent to Bush. Kerry also carried Fairfax County, the most populous county in Virginia, and Fairfax City, the first time those jurisdictions had voted Democratic since Johnson's national landslide in 1964. The strongest support in the area for the Democrats lies inside the Beltway, in Arlington, Alexandria, and parts of Fairfax County. The more distant areas (i.e., Loudoun County, Stafford County and Prince William County) historically have been more conservative; however, as they have increased in population, they have become more liberal. Both Mark Warner in 2001 and John Kerry in 2004 lost Loudoun and Prince William counties. Tim Kaine won Prince William County, and Loudoun counties in 2005. Tim Kaine won Stafford County in 2018. In 2006 despite not polling as strongly as Mark Warner statewide, Democratic senate candidate Jim Webb won both Loudoun and Prince William counties. In 2005, 65 percent of the voters of Northern Virginia voted for Democrat Tim Kaine for governor over Jerry Kilgore, who received only 32 percent of the vote, easily 14 points lower than George W. Bush's showing only a year earlier.

The Democrats in Virginia also have made considerable gains in the Virginia House of Delegates which helped turn both chambers of the state legislature to the Democrats. Since 2015 Democrats have flipped districts in the suburbs of Washington D.C in counties such as Stafford County, Prince William County, and Loudoun County. These flips have shown the changing demographics and voting bloc in these counties and the expansion of suburbanization and Northern Virginia. For example, the 28th district a seat held by Republicans since 1984 in Stafford County and parts of Fredericksburg and seat of former Republican Virginia Speaker of the House William J. Howell. 10 years ago Republicans won the Virginia House of Delegates election with 74% of the vote in the district. In the 2019 election Joshua G. Cole, a fierce Democrat and supporter of the Green New Deal, flipped the district by 4 points. Another district the 2nd district that encompasses Prince William County and Stafford County was once a swing district held by both Republicans and Democrats. In 2017, Democrats flipped the district with 64% of the vote and was re-elected with 60% of the vote with Jennifer Caroll Foy a supporter of the Equal Rights Amendment which she passed this year with the new Democratic trifecta in the state.

The 7th, 8th, the 10th, and the 11th congressional districts lie within Northern Virginia.(As of 5/15/2023) The current representatives are from the 8th district is Don Beyer (D), from the 7th district is Eugene Vindman (D), from the 10th district is Suhas Subramanyam (D), and the current representative from the 11th district is James Walkinshaw (D). Three of four districts voted for Jim Webb in the 2006 Senate election.

In the 2005 gubernatorial election, the entire region continued to move away from the Republicans. Fairfax County, Arlington County, the cities of Alexandria, Fairfax City, and Falls Church, and for the first time, Loudoun County and Prince William County, went to Tim Kaine, the Democratic candidate. The area continued to be more Democratic the closer it was to Washington, D.C., but Richmond resident Kaine was able to accomplish what Northern Virginian Mark Warner had been unable to do just four years earlier in 2001: carry Loudoun County and Prince William County (as well as win over 60 percent of the vote in Fairfax County).

In 2008, economist Nancy Pfotenhauer, a spokesperson and adviser for the John McCain presidential campaign, created controversy by referring to the areas of Virginia not included in Northern Virginia as "real Virginia", picking up on a Republican talking point that Sarah Palin promoted; namely that red states are the "real America" and more "pro-America". Joe McCain, brother of John McCain, also called Arlington and Alexandria in Northern Virginia "communist country".

In the 2008 presidential election, the majority of Northern Virginia voters voted for Democratic presidential candidate Barack Obama. Over 70 percent of registered voters in Arlington, Alexandria and Falls Church voted for Obama. Fairfax County, Loudoun County, Manassas and Prince William County also went to Obama, with Obama receiving 60 percent of the vote in Fairfax County compared to Republican candidate John McCain's 39 percent. Obama's win in Fairfax County, the most populous county in the state, marks the second time a Democrat has carried that county since the 1964 breakdown of Democratic predominance in the South (the other being the 2004 presidential elections when the county went to John Kerry). Obama's victory in Northern Virginia continues the trend of Northern Virginia favoring Democrats over Republicans.

In the 2009 gubernatorial election, though Arlington, Alexandria, and Falls Church would back Democratic state Senator Creigh Deeds in his unsuccessful run for governor, Republican former state Attorney General, and future Governor, Bob McDonnell, who overwhelmingly defeated Deeds 59 to 41 percent across the state as a whole, won Fairfax County, Loudoun County, Stafford County, Manassas, and Prince William County. However, a January 2010 special state senate election in the Fairfax county-based 37th State Senatorial district, which was held following Ken Cuccinelli's (R) resignation from the Senate of Virginia upon his election as state attorney general two months earlier, was won by then-Delegate David W. Marsden (D). Marsden's victory would suggest that despite McDonnell's performance in northern Virginia during the 2009 gubernatorial election, the Democratic trend in the region has not been reversed.

In 2011, a poll by The Washington Post found that 47 percent of Virginians favored the legalization of same-sex marriage, 43 percent opposed it, and 10 percent had no opinion. It found 55 percent favored allowing same-sex couples to adopt children, while 35 percent opposed that and 10 percent had no opinion. The same poll found that 64 percent of residents Arlington, Alexandria, Fairfax, Fairfax County support same-sex marriage, 63 percent of residents of Loudoun, Prince William, Manassas, Manassas Park, Stafford, Fauquier, Culpeper, Madison, Rappamannock, Warrenton, Clarke County, Frederick, and Winchester support same-sex marriage, while only 42 percent of the rest of Virginia supports same-sex marriage.

Arlington, Clarke, Culpeper, Fairfax, Fauquier, Frederick, Loudoun, Prince William, Rappahannock, Spotsylvania, Stafford, and Warren counties, as well as Alexandria, Falls Church, Fairfax, Fredericksburg, Manassas, Manassas Park, and Winchester cities, form Northern Virginia's contribution to the Washington metropolitan area; Hillary Clinton received 849,758 votes compared to Donald Trump's 503,120 votes in the twelve-county and seven-city region, a 63–37 percent split in the 2016 presidential election. Despite the 26 percent margin of victory for Clinton, seven counties voted for Trump. This compares to Clinton's 825,974 votes to Trump's 236,827 votes (78 to 22 percent) in Calvert, Charles, Frederick, Montgomery, and Prince George's counties in Maryland as well as her 282,830 votes to his 12,723 votes (96 to 4 percent) in Washington, D.C. Among the aforementioned counties in Maryland, Trump carried two of them. The entire Washington metropolitan area – all seventeen counties and seven cities in Maryland and Virginia, plus the District of Columbia – voted 1,958,562 ballots to 752,670 ballots (72 to 28 percent) for Clinton and Trump, respectively. Compared to the entire state, Northern Virginia's twelve counties and seven cities represent 36 percent of the total electorate.

== Culture ==
Spectators watching a performance at Wolf Trap

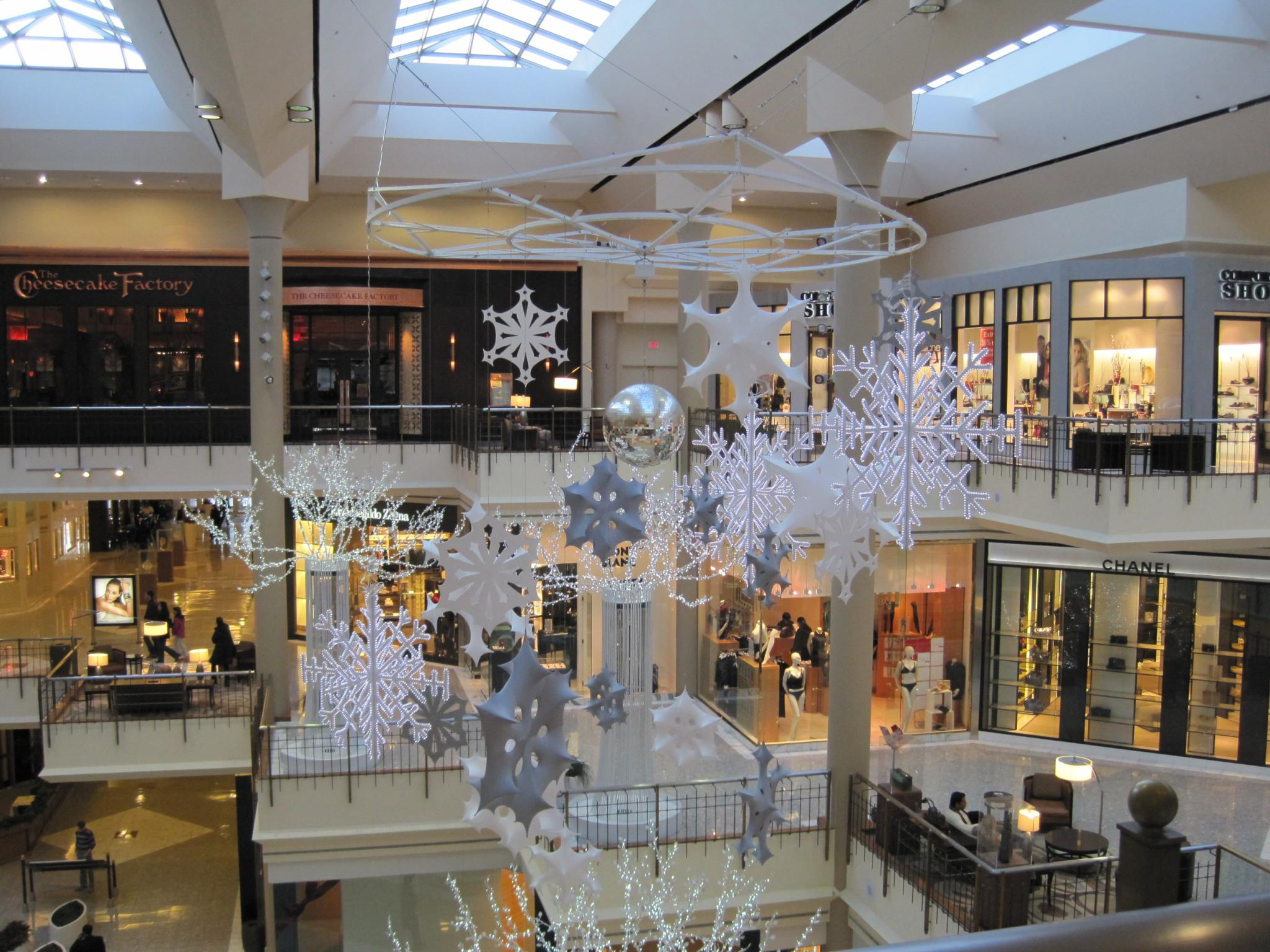
The Pentagon City and Tysons Galleria (pictured) malls are both attached to their own Ritz-Carlton hotels.

Due to the proximity to the capital, many Northern Virginians go to Washington, D.C., for cultural outings and nightlife. The Kennedy Center in Washington, D.C., is a popular place for performances, as is Wolf Trap National Park for the Performing Arts near Vienna. Jiffy Lube Live (near Manassas), EagleBank Arena at George Mason University in Fairfax, and Capital One Arena in Washington, D.C. serve as popular concert venues, and Capital One Arena also serves as the home of sporting events. Smithsonian museums also serve as local cultural institutions with easy proximity to Northern Virginia. The Udvar-Hazy Center of the National Air and Space Museum in Chantilly is also popular. Tysons Corner Center ("Tysons I") is one of the largest malls in the country and is a hub for shopping in the area. Tysons Galleria ("Tysons II"), its counterpart across Route 123, carries more high-end stores. Tysons itself is the 12th-largest business district in the United States.

Other malls include Springfield Mall, Fair Oaks Mall, Manassas Mall, Spotsylvania Towne Centre which has a mall and a mixed-use retail and commercial area, and The Fashion Centre at Pentagon City. Dulles Town Center is the region's newest mall, serving the eastern Loudoun County area. Reston Town Center is a high-density mixed-use retail, commercial, and residential development located just off the 267 Toll Road in Reston. Potomac Mills, located in Prince William County, is the largest outlet mall in the region. The town of Leesburg in Loudoun County contains the Leesburg Corner Premium Outlets outlet mall.

=== Recreation ===
Northern Virginia is home to many activities for families and individuals, including biking/walking trails, sports leagues, recreation facilities, museums, historic homes, and parks.

It is home to the Northern Virginia Swim League, which comprises 102 community pools, and NVSL-Dive, which is composed of 47 teams in Fairfax and Arlington counties. The swim and dive teams compete over the course of 5–6 weeks from the end of June through the first weekend in August.

The National Capital Area Council operates in the Washington metropolitan area. It serves localities in the Washington D.C Metropolitan Area. In Northern Virginia, it has chapters and divisions that serve, Fairfax County, Loudoun County, Prince William County, Stafford County, Arlington County, the City of Alexandria, and the City of Fairfax. It also serves Caroline County, the City of Fredericksburg, and Spotsylvania County.

The National Capital Soccer League serves soccer leagues and associations in the Washington D.C Metropolitan Area. It includes Northern Virginia soccer associations in Fairfax County, Loudoun County, Prince William County, Stafford County, Arlington County, the City of Fredericksburg, the City of Alexandria, the City of Fairfax, and one soccer association in Culpeper County, Winchester, and Warrenton.

=== Secession ===
Former Republican delegate Jeannemarie Devolites Davis expressed a common sentiment when she said "The formula for funding school construction in Northern Virginia requires that we pay 500 percent more than the actual cost of a project. We have to pay 500 percent because we give 400 percent away to the rest of the state." The state government's funding level for transportation projects in Northern Virginia is a perennial issue that often causes consternation from the region's politicians and citizens.

Many people consider the idea of secession a rhetorical one used to express frustration with the treatment of Northern Virginia by the state government as well as the opposing political sentiments between it and the rest of Virginia. Critics often point out that all states include regions of varying income and political discrepancies within their borders. Nevertheless, the Northern Virginia suburbs of Washington, D.C., are often seen as an extension of the more urbanized Mid-Atlantic, north-east, and the Boston-Washington corridor, even though Virginia as a whole is considered a Southern state. This perception is especially fueled by the region's closeness to Washington, D.C., large numbers of Northern transplants, and the prevalence of both new immigrant communities and growing ethnic diversity. Nevertheless, there is no serious secessionist movement.

== Transportation ==
=== Airports ===
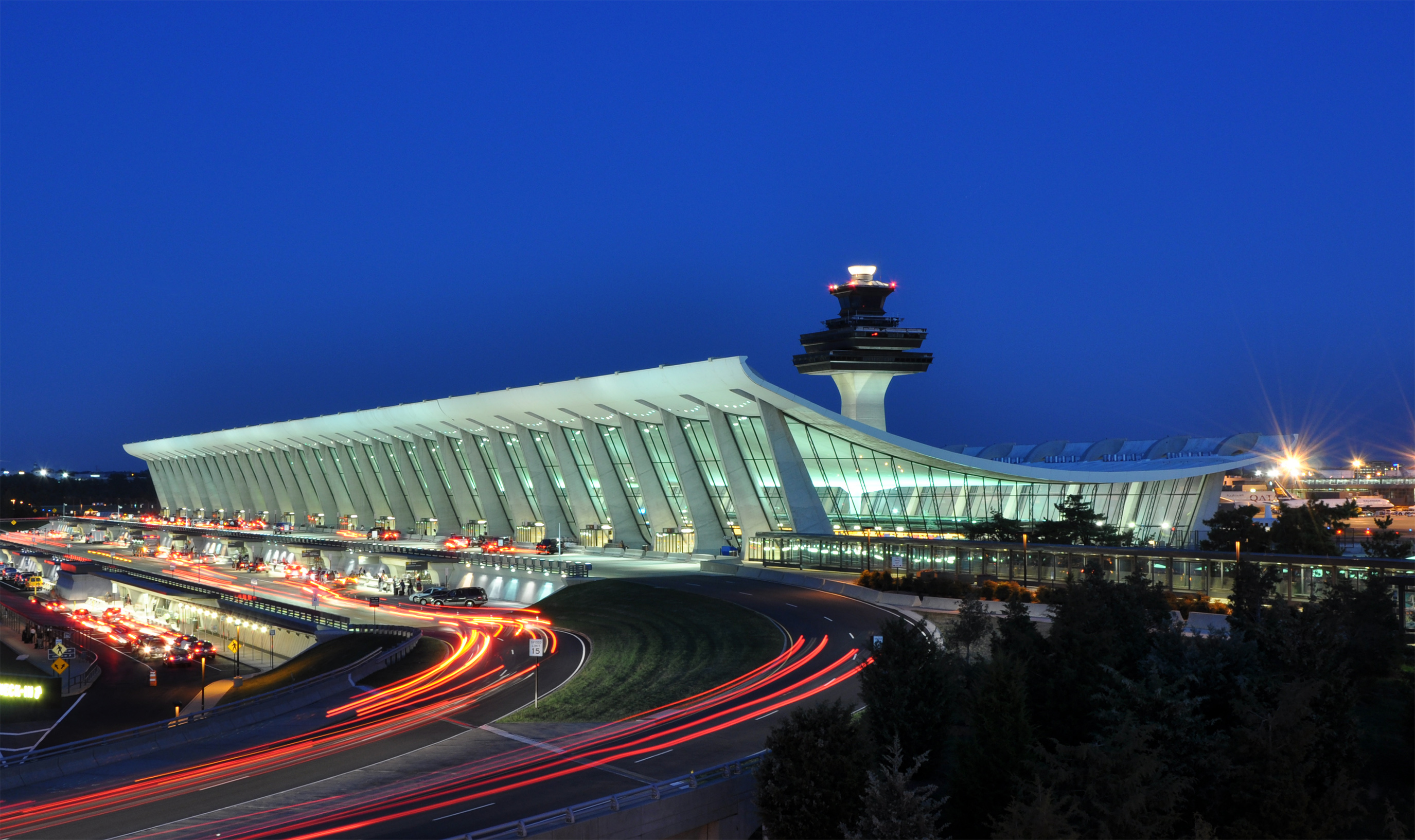
Dulles International Airport in Dulles

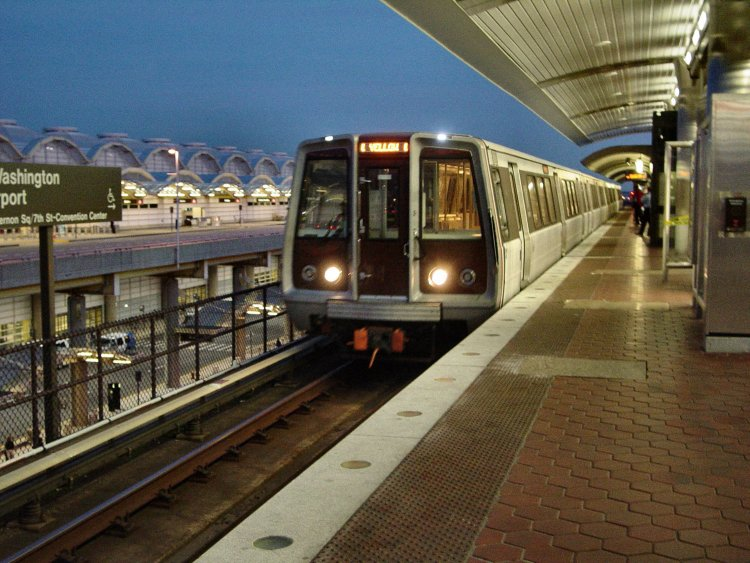
Ronald Reagan Washington National Airport station at Ronald Reagan Washington National Airport in Crystal City

The area has two major airports, Ronald Reagan Washington National Airport in Crystal City, the nation's 23rd-busiest airport by passenger traffic as of 2022 and the busiest airport in the Washington metropolitan area, and Dulles International Airport in Dulles. in both passenger loadings and aircraft movements, and the 16th-busiest airport in the nation by takeoffs and landings in 2007. Dulles is the region's primary international gateway, serves as a hub for United Airlines, and has recently improved its low-cost carrier offerings with the addition of multiple flights by Southwest and JetBlue.

=== Subway and passenger trains ===
Commuters are served by the Washington Metro subway and the Virginia Railway Express (VRE), a commuter railroad. Metro is the second-busiest subway system in the nation after the New York City Subway system. A completed expansion project extends the system past Dulles International Airport into Loudoun County. The VRE has two lines adjacent to I-66 and I-95 starting in Union Station and extending to Manassas and Spotsylvania, respectively. VRE service is significantly more limited, but nevertheless saw over a year of continuous ridership increase from 2007 into 2008. Bus service is provided by WMATA's Metrobus and several local jurisdictions.

=== Highways ===
The Washington metropolitan area has the worst traffic in the nation, and Northern Virginia is home to six of the ten worst bottlenecks in the area. To alleviate gridlock, local governments encourage using Metrorail, HOV, carpooling, slugging, and other forms of mass transportation. Major limited- or partially limited-access highways include Interstates 495 (the Capital Beltway), 95, 395, and 66, the Fairfax County Parkway and adjoining Franconia–Springfield Parkway, the George Washington Memorial Parkway, and the Dulles Toll Road. High-occupancy vehicle (HOV) lanes are used for commuters and buses on I-66, I-95/395, and the Dulles Toll Road. A study done by INRIX Roadway Analytics ranked Southbound I-95 from Washington D.C to the southern tip of Stafford County the worst single traffic hotspot in the nation. It also ranked Northbound I-95 from Spotsylvania County to the northern tip of Stafford County the seventh worst traffic hotspot in the nation. Northern Virginia is also home to the Express Lanes. These express lanes are where a car has an E-ZPass transponder and is charged for riding a distance on the express lanes. They are currently being built on I-66, and are currently available on I-395, I-495 from the Springfield Interchange to Tysons Corner but are being extended to the Maryland-Virginia border, and I-95 from the end of I-395 (Springfield Interchange) to central Stafford County and are being extended to Fredericksburg.

Two major regional bottlenecks, the Springfield Interchange and Woodrow Wilson Bridge, were massively reconstructed with completion in 2007 and 2008. Generally, Potomac River crossings remain major choke points; proposals to add crossings (such as near Leesburg or Quantico as part of a long-proposed Outer Beltway) are opposed by Virginia communities near the suggested bridge sites, and by Marylanders who fear that new bridges would bring new housing development to green space in that state such as Poolesville. Because of Northern Virginia's high housing costs, tens of thousands of employees there choose more affordable housing far away in outer Virginia exurban counties, or in Prince George's County and Southern Maryland, thus creating tremendous traffic congestion on the Potomac bridges. This situation is much like metropolitan areas of California. Furthermore, Fairfax County localities such as Great Falls, Dranesville, and Clifton impose low-density, large-acreage residential zoning, which forces developers to leapfrog into Loudoun and Prince William counties to build housing, thus increasing commuters' driving distances. In recent years, developers have continued to develop in Loudoun County, but have filled Prince William County, leading many developers to move south to Stafford County, where local government has been more receptive to developments.

== Education ==
=== Primary education ===
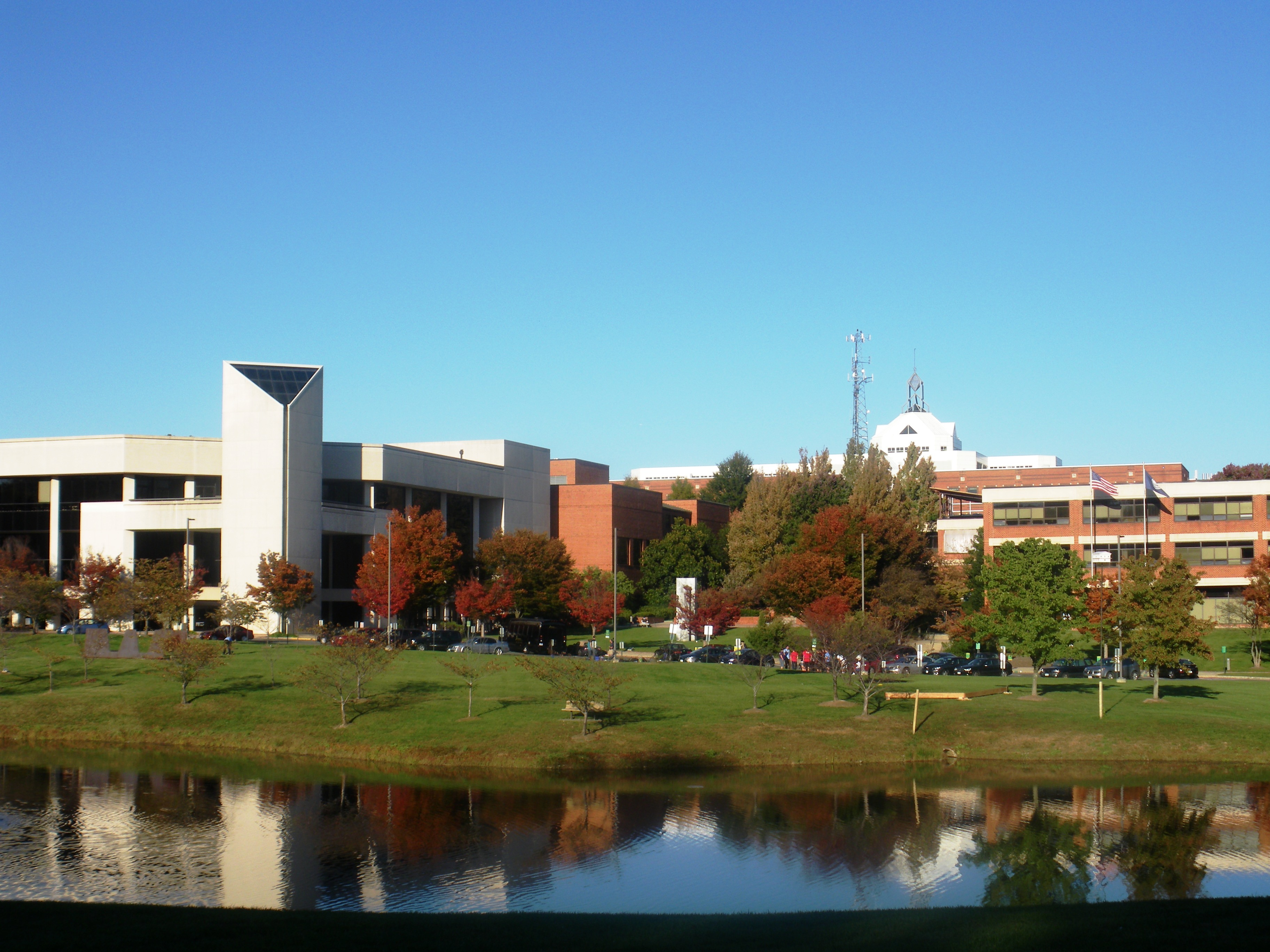
George Mason University in Fairfax, the largest university in the state by enrollment with 39,763 students as of fall 2024

Fairfax County's public school system includes the Thomas Jefferson High School for Science and Technology, an award-winning magnet school. As of 2021, 19 of the region's schools appear in the top 200 of Newsweek's "America's Top Public High Schools", and Thomas Jefferson is ranked number one. In comparison, Washington, D.C., Maryland, and the rest of Virginia have 10 schools between them in the top 200.

=== Colleges and universities ===
With 40,185 students as of fall 2023, George Mason University in Fairfax is the largest public university by student enrollment in Virginia.

Other higher education institutions include Northern Virginia Community College (colloquially known as NOVA) in Annandale (with several branch campuses throughout Northern Virginia), the University of Mary Washington in Fredericksburg, Patrick Henry College in western Loudoun County, and Marymount University in north Arlington. The University of Virginia and Virginia Tech maintain a Center in Falls Church, and George Washington University has a campus in Loudon County. Virginia Commonwealth University Health Systems has a satellite campus in Fairfax at the Inova Health System.

== See also ==
- List of state partition proposals in the United States
- Northern Virginia trolleys
- Potomac primary
