= Northern Virginia Swim League =

The Northern Virginia Swimming League, or NVSL, is a summer swimming and a separate dive league in Northern Virginia in the United States. The NVSL is the largest summer swim league in the United States with 102 teams and over 17,000 athletes.

The stated goal of both NVSL and NVSL-Dive is "...to develop in the children participating in its program—a love for the sport, advanced aquatic skills, teamwork, and the principles of good sportsmanship."

== NVSL-Swim ==
The Northern Virginia Swimming League (NVSL) currently consists of 102 teams divided into 17 divisions, with six teams in each division.

Approximately 17,000 children participate in the NVSL. The league's motto is to promote "A love for the sport, advanced aquatic skills, teamwork, and the principles of good sportsmanship."

Each team participates in five dual meets. There are five age groups for both boys and girls: 8&U, 9-10, 11-12, 13-14, and 15-18. Swimmers compete in freestyle, backstroke, breaststroke and butterfly individual events, freestyle relays for the 8&U age group, medley relays for all other age groups, mixed age relays one each for boys and girls, for a total of 52 events in a dual meet.

== NVSL-Swimming Individual All-Stars ==
The NVSL Individual All-Stars swim meet is a competition between select swimmers in each age group and event. The races consist of swimmers with the top 18 times league-wide from a Divisonals qualifying meet, with two alternate swimmers in case one or more scheduled swimmers are not present. Cards are pulled for additional swimmers in case either of the alternates or multiple scratches are made.

While most NVSL meets are focused on team competition, the Individual All-Stars meet is more oriented toward the league's best individual swimmers. There is also an All-Star Relay Carnival meet for the 18 top relays league-wide based on performance at each Division Relay Carnival held the week before. The relay carnivals are held earlier in the season on Wednesday evenings.

The NVSL Individual All-Stars meet is held on the first Saturday in August. There is no team score for this meet. However, the NVSL All-Star Relay Carnival is a scored team meet, and a winner is determined by total points at the end of the meet. In addition to the five dual meets for each team, the NVSL also schedules a Division Relay Carnival for each division, its All-Star Relay Carnival, Division Individual Championship meets for each division and Individual All-Stars.

== NVSL-Dive ==
Beginning in 1957, NVSL-Dive began sponsoring dive competition in Northern Virginia. The teams are sponsored by local community pools with diving boards. NVSL-Dive is currently composed of 47 teams that are divided into 8 divisions. The teams compete weekly over the course of a 5 week season, and a team is named the division champion. Meets are held on Tuesday evenings from late June through late July. In a dual meet, each team is allowed a total of 32 divers. Following the conclusion of the regular season, each division holds an Individual Division Championship, which is used to qualify for the League's Individual All-Star Championship Meet, which is typically held the first Sunday in August.

Divers are divided by gender into four age categories: Freshmen (10 & under - 3 dives), Juniors (11-12 - 4 dives), Intermediates (13-14 - 5 dives), and Seniors (15 and older - 6 dives). The category is determined by the diver's age on June 1 of each year. Divers are allowed to compete through the summer following their graduation from high school

== NVSL-Dive championships ==
NVSL-Dive hosts the annual Cracker Jack Invitational. This meet is the world's largest one-day diving competition. At the 2009 meet, which was hosted by Truro in Annandale, Virginia, 354 divers (218 girls and 136 boys) competed. Established in 1987 to provide a skill-appropriate championship for beginning divers. The first Cracker Jack Invitational was held at Freedom Park and attracted approximately 600 divers. For many years, this meet was hosted by Overlee pool in Arlington, Virginia, and moved to Cardinal Hill in Vienna for 2007 and 2008. In 2012, the meet was hosted by Mansion House.

Since its beginning in 1987, more than 9,000 divers have competed at Crackerjack. NVSL-Dive sponsors an annual 3-meter meet. Col. Wallace R. Martin arranged for the meet to be held at his home pool, Tuckahoe, in 1968 and then again every year thereafter for the rest of his life. Martin died in 1977, and in 1978 the NVSL 3-Meter Meet was renamed the Wally Martin 3-Meter Championship in his memory.

== NVSL Scholarships ==
Scholarships are awarded each year by the Northern Virginia Swimming League to recognize NVSL graduates' outstanding contributions to the league and their communities, and to defray a portion of their continuing education expenses. There are five scholarships in total.

Presidents' Scholarship - Created in honor of the volunteers who served as NVSL League Presidents.

Community Service Scholarship - Created in honor of George MacDuff and daughter Melinda. George served as the League Records Chairperson for many years.

Sportsmanship Scholarship - Created in honor of Joan Olson, long-time Director of the NVSL and Chairperson of the Seeding Committee, who was a passionate advocate for sportsmanship.

Spirit Scholarship - Created in honor of Olivia Aull to recognize spirited swimmers and divers from within the NVSL family.

Excellence in Technique Scholarship - Created in honor of Lou Sharp, founder of the Competition Swim Clinic, who guided generations of NVSL swimmers in stroke technique and love for swimming.

== NVSL Olympians ==
Numerous Olympian have been connected with the NVSL {{citation needed}}.

MELISSA BELOTE Swimming, USA Springfield 1972 and 1976 Olympics. 3x Olympic gold medalist and former world record holder in 200 backstroke CM and 400 medley relay LCM

SUSAN VON DER LIPPE (RAPP) Swimming, USA Springboard 1980 (boycotted), 1984, and 1988 Olympics Olympic gold and silver medalist

MIKE STORM Pentathlon, USA Tuckahoe 1984 Olympics Olympic silver medalist

MATT SCOGGIN Diving, USA Great Falls 1992 Olympics

ED MOSES Swimming, USA Old Keene Mill 2000 Olympics. Olympic gold and silver medalist and former world record holder in 100 breaststroke SCM and 200 breaststroke SCM

MARKUS ROGAN Swimming, Austria Mansion House 2000, 2004, 2008, and 2012 Olympics. 2x Olympic silver medalist. Former world record holder in 200 backstroke SCM

SUSAN WILLIAMS (BARTHOLOMEW) Triathlon, USA Springfield 2004 Olympics Olympic bronze medalist

KATE ZIEGLER Swimming, USA Great Falls 2008 and 2012 Olympics. Former world record holder in 1500 freestyle LCM, 1500 freestyle SCM, and 800 freestyle SCM

ANDREW SELISKAR Swimming, USA McLean 2020 Olympics

GREG DUNCAN Diving, USA Dunn Loring 2024 Olympics
