= Tupperware Brands =

American manufacturer of kitchen and household products

Tupperware Brand Corporation
- Type: Public
- Traded as: NYSE: TUP (1996-2024), Expert Market: TUPBQ (2024-2025)
- Industry: Consumer products, household goods
- Founded: 1938 (88 years ago) in Grafton, Massachusetts
- Founder: Earl Tupper
- Headquarters: 14901 South Orange Blossom Trail, Kissimmee, Florida, United States
- Key people: Susan Cameron, Chair; Laurie Ann Goldman, CEO
- Products: Food storage, kitchen preparation, serving, microwave, on-the-go, baking, cookware, great cutlery, cosmetics, personal care products
- Revenue: ▲$1,602.3 million (2021)
- Operating income: ▲US$250.5 million (2021)
- Net income: ▲US$155.6 million (2021)
- Total assets: ▲US$1,255.4 million (2021)
- Total equity: ▲US$207.1 million (shareholders' equity) (2021)
- Number of employees: 10,000 (2021)
- Website: www.tupperware.com

Tupperware Brands Corporation, formerly Tupperware Corporation, is an American multinational company that produces home product lines that include kitchen gadgets, preparation, storage containers, and serving products for the kitchen and home. Its main focus is kitchen and household products, and it is particularly known for its line of plastic containers for food storage and preparation. By extension, plastic food containers in general, regardless of brand, are sometimes referred to as Tupperware.

== History ==
Tupperware Brands Corporation was founded as The Tupperware Company in 1938 in South Grafton, Massachusetts by Earl Tupper. In 1951, Tupper and his wife moved the company's headquarters to Kissimmee, Florida, where they had purchased 1,000 acres of land. In 1958, Tupper sold The Tupperware Company for $16 million to Rexall. In December 2005, Tupperware Corporation changed its name to Tupperware Brands Corporation to reflect the company's increasing product diversity.

Starting in 1997, Tupperware was directed by Rick Goings.

In 2020, Tupperware Brands Corp. appointed Miguel Fernandez as a new chief executive, who previously served in executive positions at Avon Products Inc. and Herbalife Nutrition Ltd., as CEO. He took over the top position at the company April 6, 2020.

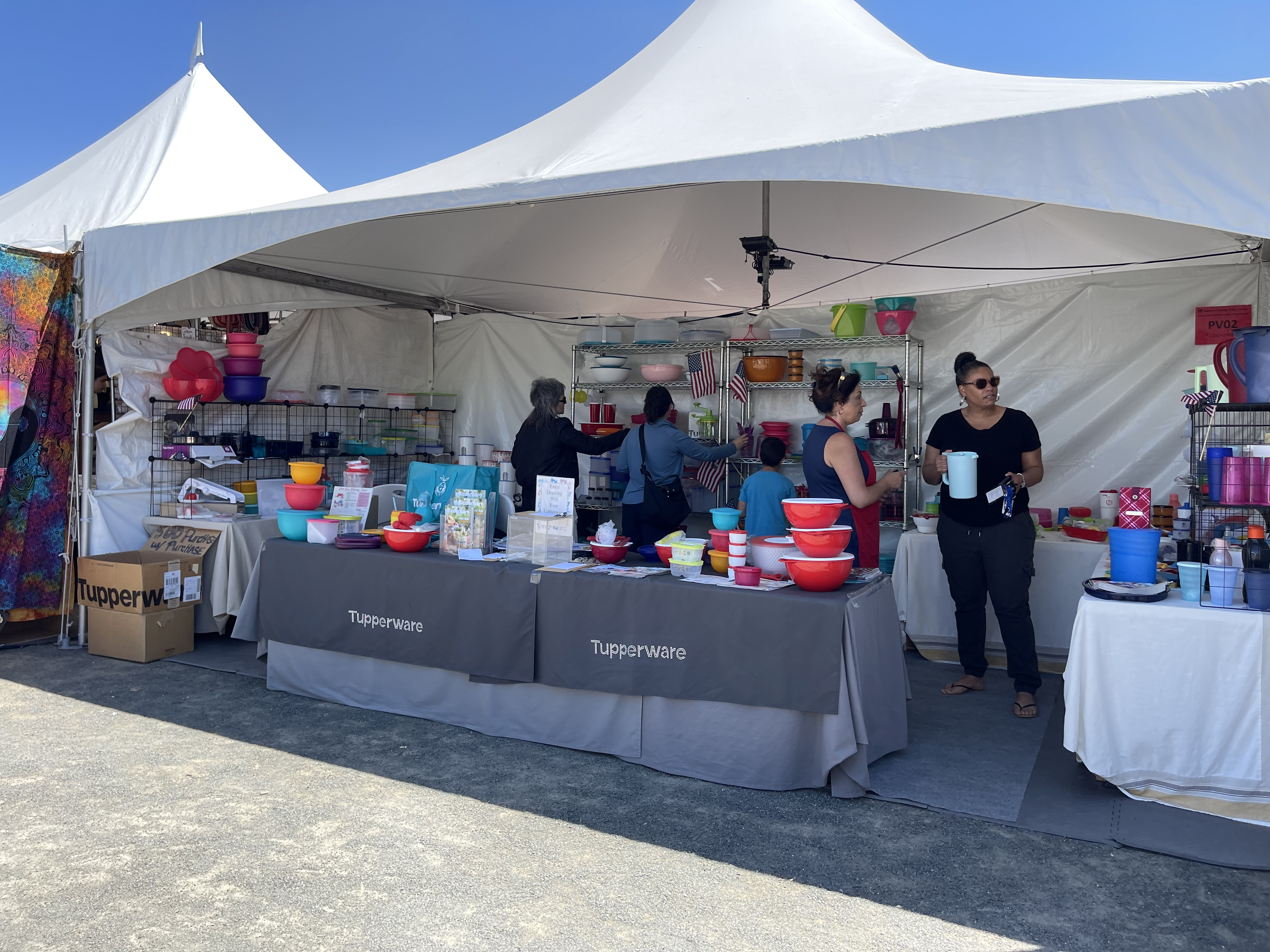
A stand selling Tupperware at the Marin County Fair in 2023

Laurie Ann Goldman, former CEO of clothing manufacturer Spanx, replaced Fernandez as Tupperware CEO on October 17, 2023.

On September 16, 2024, Tupperware Brands Corp. announced that they were preparing to file for Chapter 11 bankruptcy protection later in the week after a failed comeback after beneficial sales during the COVID-19 pandemic. The company's stock fell nearly 60% after the announcement. On September 17, the company was delisted from the New York Stock Exchange, and commenced trading over-the-counter. On September 18, Tupperware Brands filed for Chapter 11 bankruptcy protection, with plans to continue operating during the proceedings. In October, Tupperware avoided its liquidation via a deal with its creditors. In November 2024, the Tupperware brand name was acquired by Party Products LLC, who will allow for Tupperware's operations to continue.

== Brands ==
A decade after starting business in the United States, Tupperware expanded into Europe. By 1965, the company had a presence in six European countries, and then launched in Singapore, Japan, and Australia. Tupperware also had sales offices in Africa and Latin America before 1970. After that, Tupperware Brands expanded to almost 100 countries around the world under seven brands connected to it: the brands Tupperware, Avroy Shlain, BeautiControl, Fuller Cosmetics (including Armand Dupree), NaturCare, Nutrimetics, and Nuvo.

In 2008, due to its success in developing the brand's name in China, India, and Indonesia, Tupperware received awards for "Most Favored Brand by Women" and "Company with the Best Corporate Face."

== Awards ==
In 2010, the company was ranked equal #2 in Fortune's Most Admired Home equipment and furnishings section.

== See also ==
- Joe Hara
- Brownie Wise
