= Tysons Corner Center =

Shopping mall in Fairfax County, Virginia, U.S.

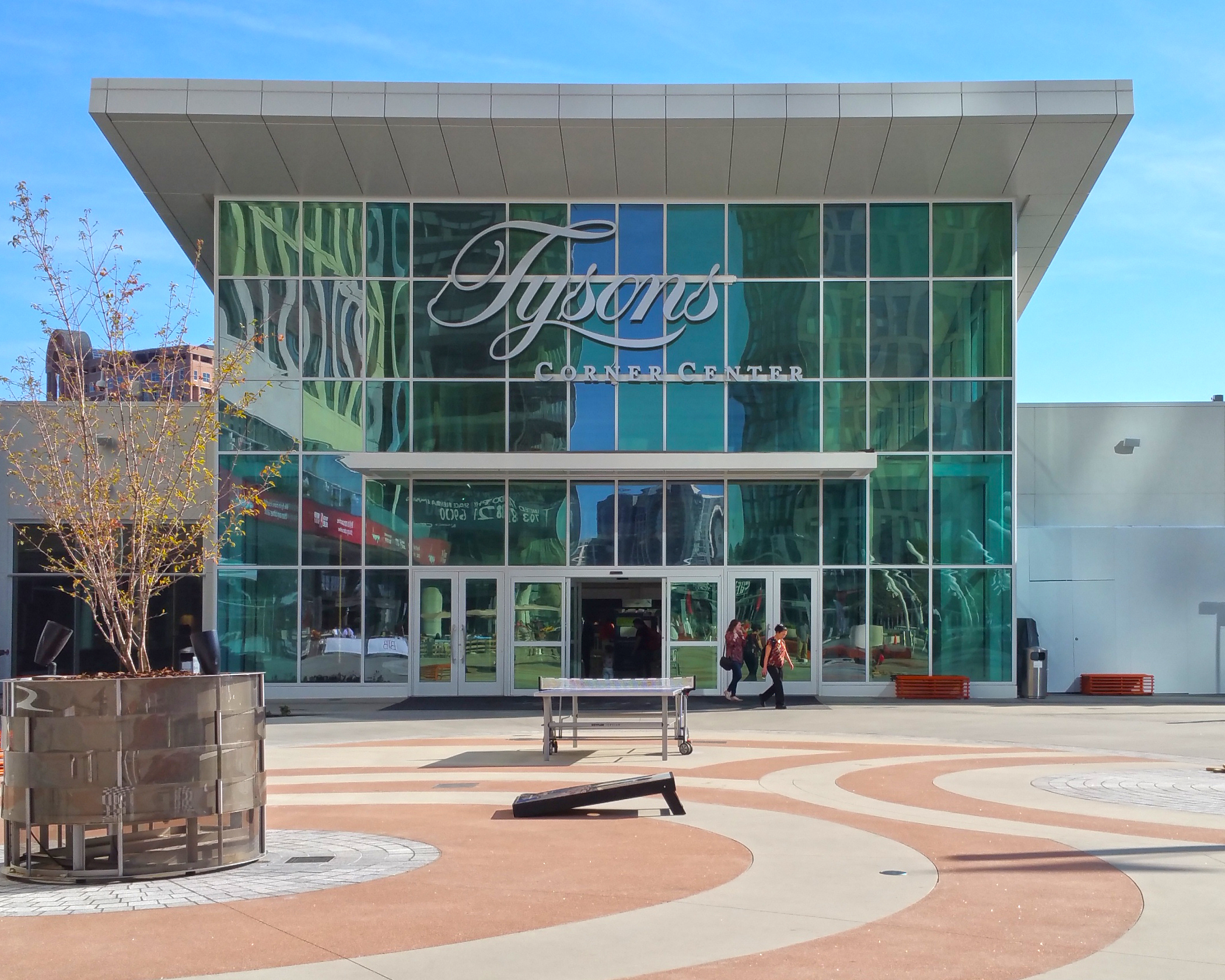
- The entrance to Tysons Corner Center from the Washington Metro's Silver Line mezzanine
- Location: Tysons, Virginia, U.S.
- Coordinates: 38.91713°N 77.22224°W
- Opened: July 25, 1968; 58 years ago
- Developer: Lerner Enterprises
- Owner: Macerich
- Num. of stores: 300+
- Num. of anchor tenants: 4 (3 open, 1 under construction)
- Floor area: 2.4 million square feet (220,000 m^{2})
- Floors: 2 with partial third level (AMC Theatres, food court, 3 in Macy's and Nordstrom, 4 in Bloomingdale's)
- Parking: Surfaced lots as well as 5 parking terraces
- Public transit: Washington Metro: at Tysons; Metrobus: A70, F20; Fairfax Connector: 401, 402, 423, 462, 463, 721, 798
- Website: http://www.shoptysons.com

Tysons Corner Center is a super-regional shopping mall in the unincorporated area of Tysons in Fairfax County, Virginia, United States (between McLean and Vienna, Virginia). It opened to the public in 1968, becoming one of the first fully enclosed, climate-controlled shopping malls in the Washington metropolitan area. The mall's anchor department stores are Macy's, Nordstrom, and Bloomingdale's. A Dick's Sporting Goods is currently under construction. The mall also features prominent specialty retailers including Everlane, Fabletics, Untuckit, Oak + Fort, Intimissimi, Aesop, and Warby Parker.

Tysons Corner Center is the largest mall in the Washington, D.C. metropolitan area, and the 8th largest in the United States. The mall is located 12.5 miles (20.1 km) from the central business district of Washington D.C., and neighbors a second mall, Tysons Galleria, across Chain Bridge Road. To distinguish the two, some people refer to Tysons Corner Center as "Tysons I," and Tysons Galleria as "Tysons II."

== History ==
=== 20th century ===
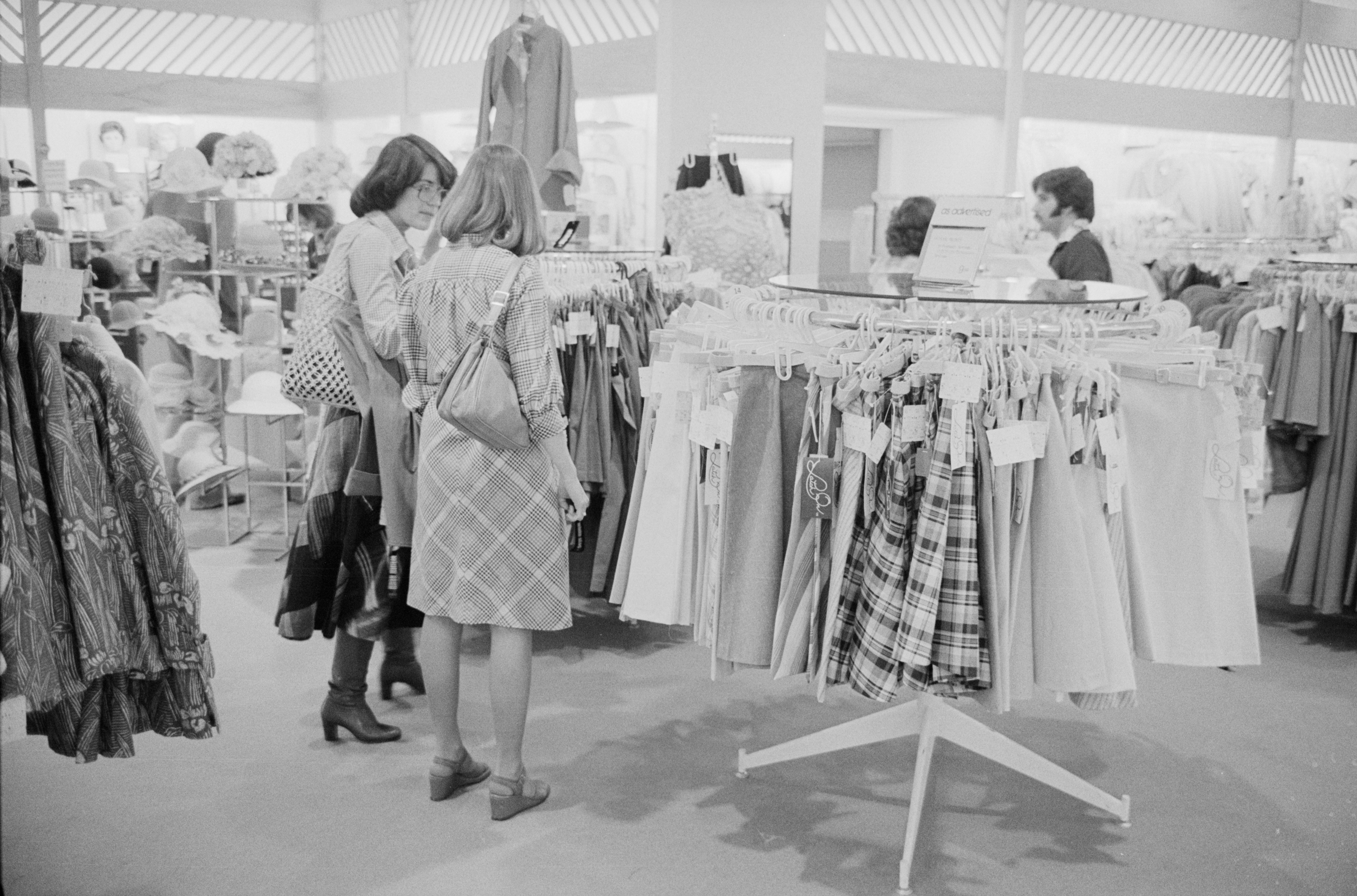
Two women shopping for clothing at the mall in 1976

Tysons Corner Center was one of the first super-regional malls in the country, drawing customers from a multi-state area. The mall was built as a follow-on partnership by Isadore Gudelsky and Theodore Lerner's Wheaton Plaza which opened in 1960. On May 31, 1962, the $20 million project was awarded to Lerner-Gudelsky by a 4–2 vote against James Rouse's Rouse Company with a controversial vote by William H Moss, a County supervisor who also worked for Gudelsky's District Title Insurance Company.

The 1.2 million square feet (110,000 m^{2}) one-story mall opened on July 25, 1968, with just 35 of its 100 stores open and just two of its three department store anchors, Hecht's and Woodward & Lothrop. The third anchor department store, Lansburgh's, did not open until a year later, on October 19, 1969, due to a lawsuit involving an exchange of its lease for favorable zoning. The finished mall contained 100 specialty stores, including Jelleff's and discount chain Woolworth's, which operated a store in the mall until the entire chain went under in 1997.

Lansburgh's closed in 1973, when City Stores shuttered the entire chain. They rebranded the building as another of their stores, Lit Brothers, from 1973 to 1975. The building was then renovated as the first full-line branch of Bloomingdale's outside of New York City, reopening on September 9, 1976.

The mall was originally designed around five themed "courts": the Umbrella Court in front of Lansburgh's, the Fashion Court, the Fountain Court in front of Hechts, the Aviary Court and the Clock Court located near Woodward & Lothrop. Some of the few remaining pieces of the original infrastructure of the 1968 mall are the escalators that serve the second and third floor of Bloomingdale's (the original Lansburgh's escalators), and the original passenger and freight elevators from Woodward & Lothrop/JCPenney. Both are still in operation, however they are located in the back hallways and used as service elevators.

In 1988, the mall was expanded to add a second floor, at which time Lord & Taylor and Nordstrom opened; this was the first Nordstrom east of the Mississippi River. In 1995, Woodward & Lothrop closed and was converted to JCPenney, which closed 10 years later in 2005. The anchor store building was gutted and expanded and converted into two additional levels of mall space, anchored by a 16-screen AMC multiplex movie theater, Barnes & Noble, and Old Navy.

Today, the mall has 2.1 million square feet (195,000 m^{2}) of retail space on three levels, 16 movie screens, two food courts and nearly 300 stores. From its opening until the 1990s, the mall contained a wide and diverse retail mix. Hot Shoppes cafeteria also occupied space in the mall until 1998. These types of stores shared space with higher-end tenants such as Liz Claiborne and A/X Armani Exchange.

=== 21st century ===
In the 2000s, under the ownership of Wilmorite Properties, the mall re-tenanted and has served as the primary launchpad location for a number of successful retail chains. LL Bean opened its first full line department store outside of its Freeport, Maine headquarters in 2000. Apple opened the first of its retail stores at Tysons in 2001. Martin + Osa and Cusp by Neiman Marcus opened in 2006. MNG By Mango made their U.S. debut at Tysons in 2006 as well, but that store has since closed. In 2007, Canadian-based clothing retailer Garage opened its first U.S. store at Tysons. Many retailers have flagship stores at the mall, including Victoria's Secret.

Soon after Tysons Corner Center was constructed, the land surrounding the area, previously consisting of farms and rural residences, became prime real estate, prompting the construction of hotels, office buildings, and apartment complexes. Major retailers near Tysons Corner Center include Crate & Barrel, Tiffany & Co., Hermes Paris, Louis Vuitton, and Gucci, some of which are located in Fairfax Square.

In 2004, Macerich acquired Wilmorite Properties, adding Tysons Corner Center to its portfolio. Tyson's Corner Center was a particularly significant expansion as the plans were well under way for a massive mixed-use development creating a more urban environment.

As part of the "Tysons Future" renovation and expansion plans, a glass elevator has been added to the Fashion Court, where the Nordstrom wing meets the main mall hallway, which opened on November 28, 2008.

In 2013, Tysons Corner Center was assessed for $1 billion, making it by far the most valuable property in the metropolitan area.

On January 19, 2020, the Lord & Taylor anchor store closed. On December 28, 2021, Macerich, the mall development firm, announced plans to redevelop the empty store into either a 330-foot, 540,000 square feet office tower, or a 400-foot tower with a mix of office and residential space. Both options would include 50,000 square feet of retail centered around the plaza.

The mall's L.L. Bean store closed on January 17, 2022. Macerich reconstructed the space into multiple smaller in-line stores.

On May 19, 2023, Apple relocated to a new location in the mall, on the 22nd anniversary of the first store's opening.

By 2023, Tyson's Corner Center had announced several new additions. Among them are UpWest, Kendra Scott, Everlane, Primark, Purple, Oak + Fort, CAMP, ThirdLove, The Lexus Experience, Lovisa, Cotton On, Dr. Martens, in addition to entirely new store formats for the Apple Store and Lululemon Athletica.

In February, 2026, Dick’s Sporting Goods announced that they would be opening one of their large format Dick’s House of Sport stores within the former Lord & Taylor anchor space. The plan to redevelop the Lord & Taylor anchor space into an office or retail and office tower was scrapped in favor of Dick’s House of Sport which has been opening stores across the United States as part of a major expansion.

=== Notable openings ===
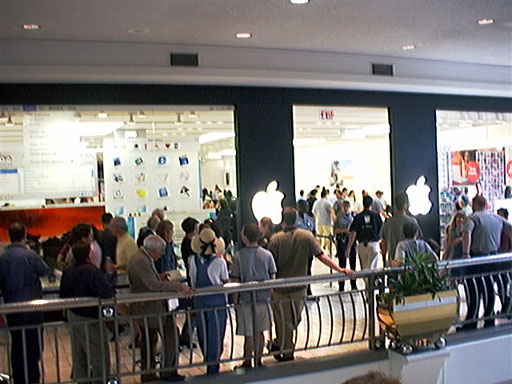
The world's first Apple Store opened in Tysons Corner Center in 2001

- First Nordstrom outside of the West Coast (1988)
- First L.L. Bean outside of original Freeport, Maine store (2000)
- First Apple Store in the world (2001)
- First Microsoft Store in the Northeast (2011)
- First Spanx store in the world (2012)

== Plans ==
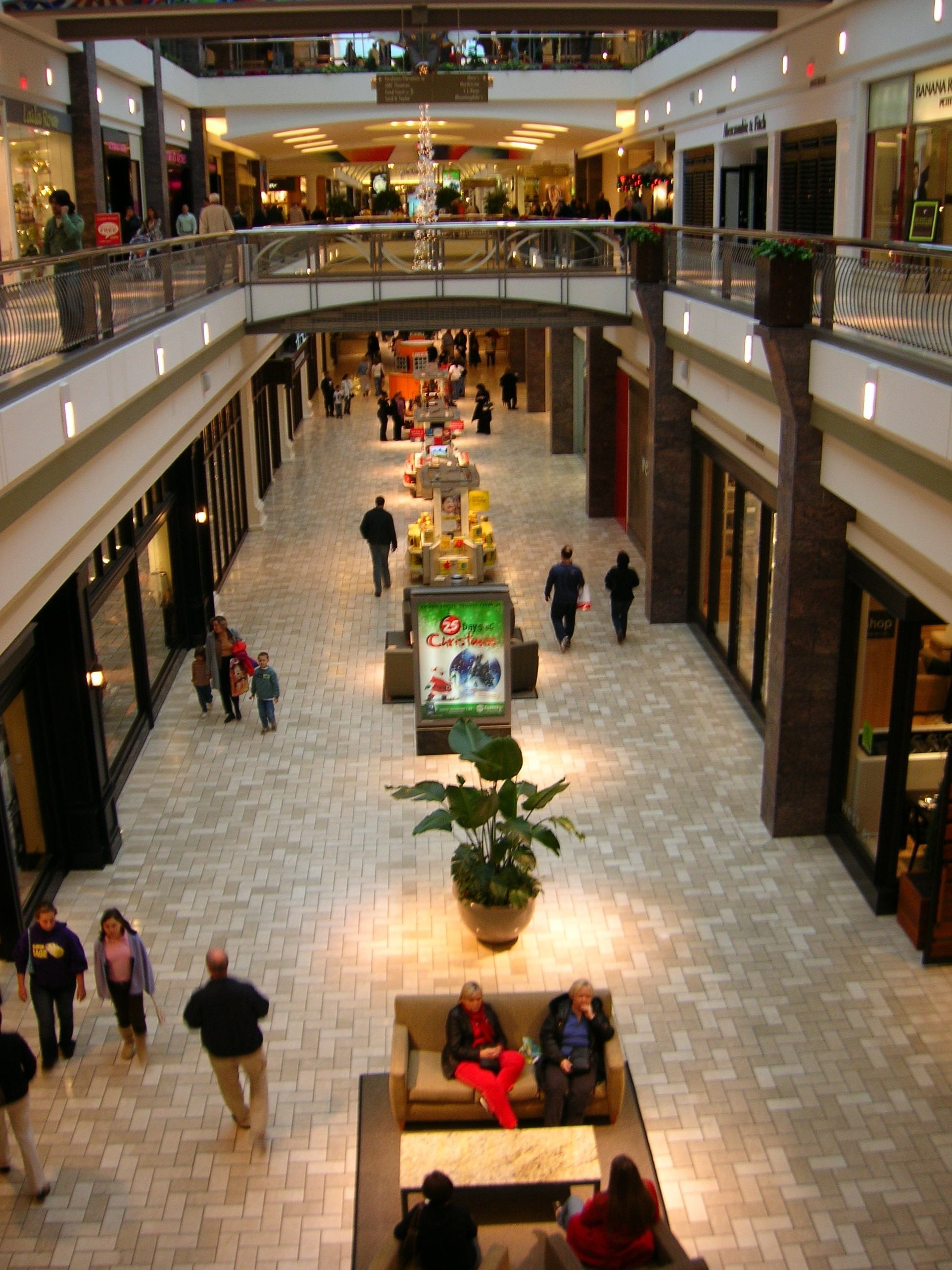
Inside Tysons Corner Center in the expansion wing in 2006.

The Washington Metro Silver Line had been extended west to Tysons, and has since been extended to Dulles International Airport and beyond. The Tysons station on the Silver Line is on the north side of the shopping center where Tysons Boulevard crosses State Route 123 (Chain Bridge Road). There are four stations in the Tysons area. Utility relocation for the project began in 2008. The Silver Line opened July 26, 2014.

The Macerich Company, who acquired owner Wilmorite Properties in 2005, is developing Tysons Corner Center into a community location. There will be expansions for residential and commercial buildings, along with a hotel. There will also be slight expansions to the mall. The project will be completed in four stages and it is expected to be finished in 10 to 15 years, adding 3,500,000 sq ft (325,160 m^{2}) of office, residential, and retail space.

== See also ==
- Tysons Galleria — a shopping mall located directly north of Tysons Corner Center
- Fairfax Square — a mixed-use development located directly south of Tysons Corner Center
- List of the world's largest shopping malls
- List of largest shopping malls in the United States
