= Earl Tupper =

American businessman and inventor (1907–1983)

- Born: Earl Silas Tupper; July 28, 1907; Berlin, New Hampshire, United States
- Died: October 3, 1983 (aged 76); Costa Rica
- Education: Bryant College
- Occupation(s): inventor, company founder
- Known for: Inventor of Tupperware; Founder of Tupperware Corporation

Earl Silas Tupper (July 28, 1907 – October 3, 1983) was an American businessman and inventor, best known as the inventor of Tupperware, an airtight plastic container for storing food, and for founding the related home products company that bears his name, Tupperware Plastics Company.

== Early life and career ==
Tupper was born on a farm in Berlin, New Hampshire. The Tupper family moved when he was three years old, spending the rest of his youth growing up on different farms in central Massachusetts.

After studying at Bryant College (now Bryant University) in Providence, Rhode Island, he began a landscaping and nursery business until the Great Depression forced the business into bankruptcy. He then got a job with the DuPont chemical company.

== Creation of Tupperware ==
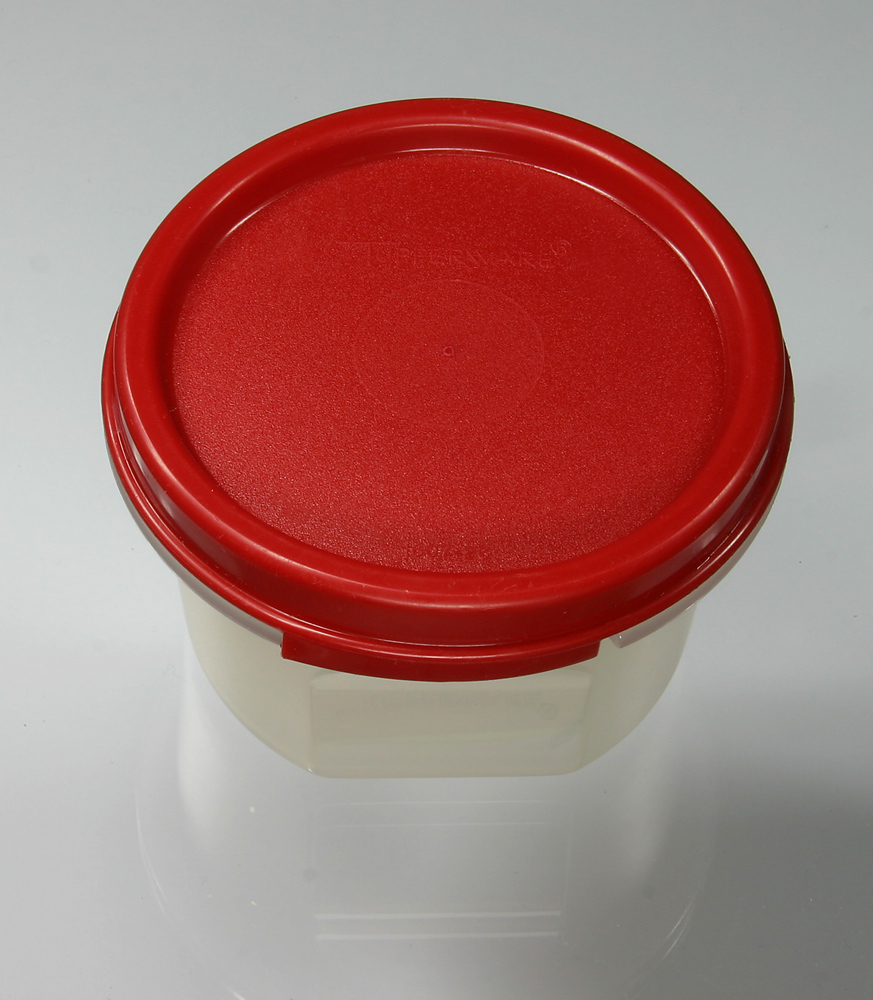
An example of Tupperware

Using black, inflexible pieces of polyethylene slag, a waste product of the oil refining process given to him by his supervisor at DuPont, Tupper purified the slag and molded it to create lightweight, non-breakable containers, cups, bowls, plates, and even gas masks that were used in World War II. He later designed liquid-proof, airtight lids, inspired by the secure seal of paint can lids.

== Business ==
Tupper founded the Tupperware Plastics Company in 1938 and in 1948, the company introduced Tupper Plastics to hardware and department stores. Around 1946, he joined forces with Brownie Wise, who caught his attention after she made a lengthy phone call to his office in South Grafton, Massachusetts, during which she explained her extraordinary success selling Tupperware via home parties.

Based on a marketing strategy developed by Wise and early pioneers Tom and Ann Damigella from Everett, Massachusetts, Tupperware was withdrawn from sale in retail stores in the early 1950s and Tupperware "parties" soon became popular in homes. This was the first instance of what became known as "party plan" marketing.

The corporate headquarters was moved from Massachusetts to Orlando, Florida. After his falling-out with Wise that resulted in her dismissal in 1958, Tupper sold The Tupperware Company for $16 million to Rexall. Shortly afterward, he divorced his wife, gave up his U.S. citizenship to avoid taxes, and bought an island just off the coast of Costa Rica or according to other sources Isla San José.

He co-founded 'Sterilite', a plastic houseware manufacturing company, in 1939 with Saul and Edward Stone.

== Philanthropy ==
In 1969, Tupper donated 428 acres of land in Smithfield, Rhode Island, to his alma mater, Bryant College (now named Bryant University). The land was developed into the college's new campus, which opened in 1971. The campus in Providence where Tupper had once studied was sold to Brown University.

== Death ==
Tupper died in Costa Rica on October 3, 1983, at the age of 76.
