= Spanks =

Spanks may refer to:

- Spanx, an American clothing company
- Spanking, a form of corporal punishment
