= Tysons Galleria =

Coordinates: 38.92391°N 77.22505°W

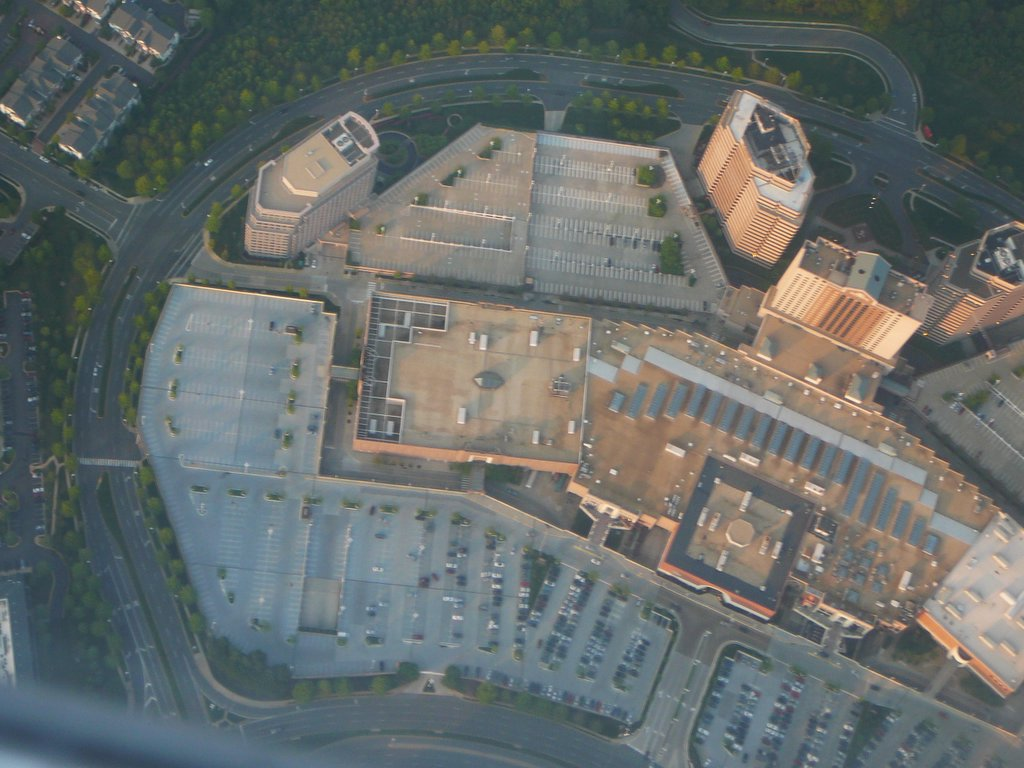
- The Tysons Galleria area from the air.
- Location: 2001 International Drive, Tysons, Virginia, United States
- Opened: October 6, 1988; 38 years ago
- Developer: Lerner Enterprises; Homart Development Company
- Manager: GGP
- Owner: GGP
- Num. of stores: 120+
- Num. of anchor tenants: 2 (1 open, 1 vacant)
- Floor area: 800,000 sq ft (74,000 m^{2})
- Floors: 3
- Public transit: Washington Metro: at Tysons; Metrobus: A70, F20; Fairfax Connector: 401, 402, 423, 462, 463, 467, 721, 798
- Website: www.tysonsgalleria.com

Tysons Galleria is a three-level super-regional mall owned by Brookfield Properties located at 2001 International Drive in Tysons, Virginia. It is the second-largest mall in Tysons, and one of the largest in the Washington metropolitan area.

== History ==
The mall was the third major project of the Gudelsky-Lerner partnership. The property was purchased from The Rouse Company which lost a bitter zoning dispute over the site in 1963. In 1981, Lerner bought out the partnership for $21 million, before embarking on a $550 million expansion. It was constructed across Virginia State Route 123 from the existing Tysons Corner Center, which was then undergoing a $160 million expansion.

Anchor store Macy's opened first, on September 1, 1988. The rest of the mall opened a month later, on October 6, 1988, as The Galleria at Tysons II, adding high-end anchor department stores Neiman Marcus and Saks Fifth Avenue. The mall was a part of the $500 million ($1 billion in 2014 dollars) office development The Corporate Office Centre at Tysons II, leading regional residents to refer to Tysons Galleria as "Tysons II", and the older Tysons Corner Center retroactively as "Tysons I". In the early 1990s, the shopping center had annual sales of $262 per square foot, below the market average for malls in the Washington metropolitan area during this time period.

The Galleria was renovated to appear more like a "European streetscape" and expanded in 1997 by Homart Development Company, who had its name changed to Tysons Galleria. Its interior was lightly remodeled to appear less like a "space walk".

The mall eventually attracted the high-end tenants that it had hoped for. National Geographic stated in its December 2002 issue that "Tysons Galleria is the Rodeo Drive of the East Coast." The Washington Post described it as a "bright and elegant Fifth Avenue-like mall". Tysons Galleria was rated one of the top 15 sales-producing shopping centers in terms of dollars per square foot by WWD in 2003.

On January 10, 2019, it was announced that Macy's would close. Macy's had operated a second location directly across the street at Tysons Corner Center since 2006, when it was converted from Hecht's. The former Macy's anchor store was reconstructed into additional mall space, featuring tenants such as Restoration Hardware (relocated from Tysons Corner Center), Crate & Barrel (relocated from a standalone store in Tysons), Arhaus (relocated from Tysons Corner Center), Bowlero, and a movie theater.

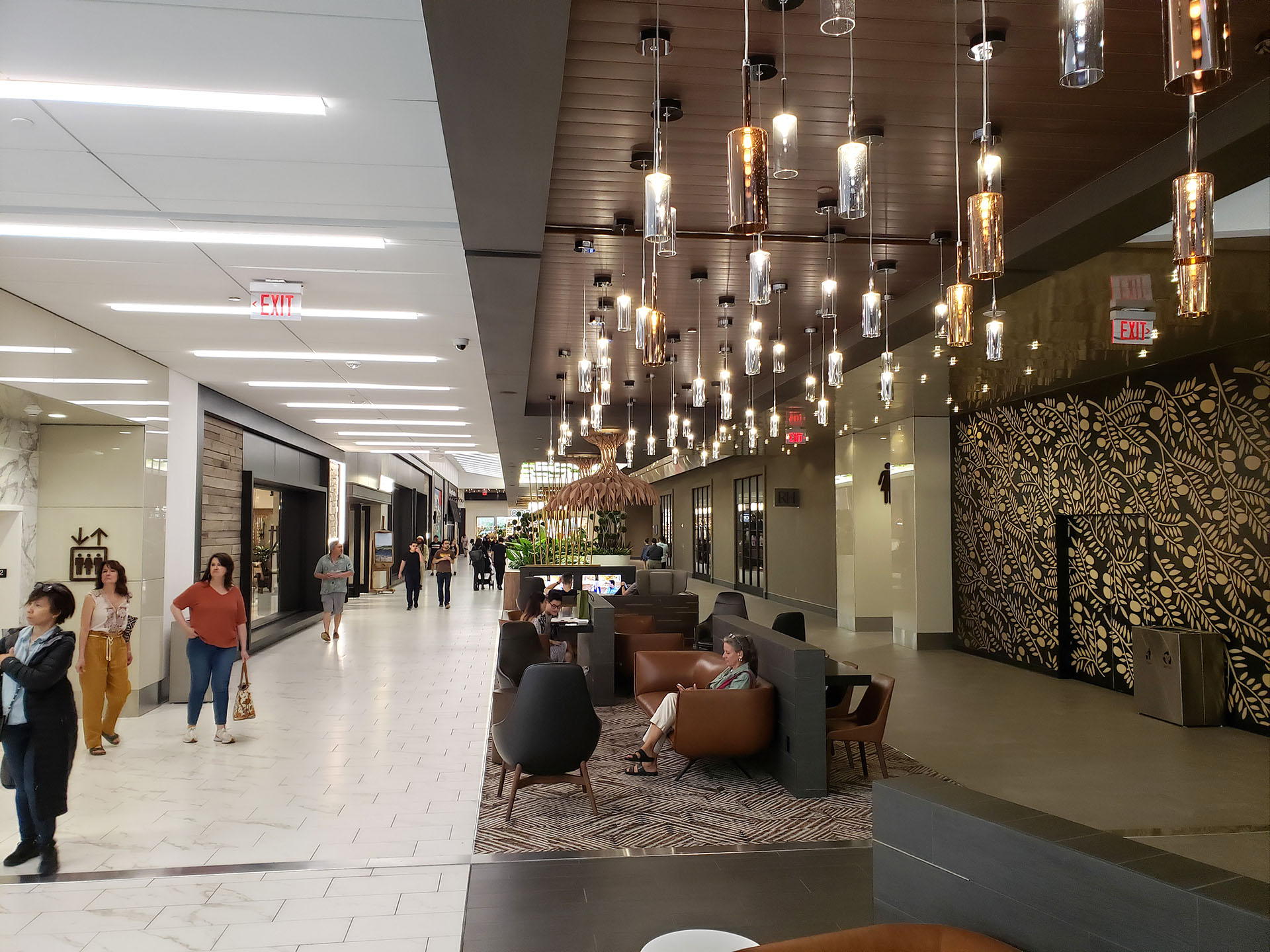
Entrance to former Macy's store location reconstructed to additional mall space.

On March 6, 2026, Saks Global announced the closure of 12 Saks Fifth Avenue and 3 Neiman Marcus locations nationwide in an effort to further cut costs and focus on more profitable locations, including the Saks store at Tysons Galleria.

== Layout and tenants ==
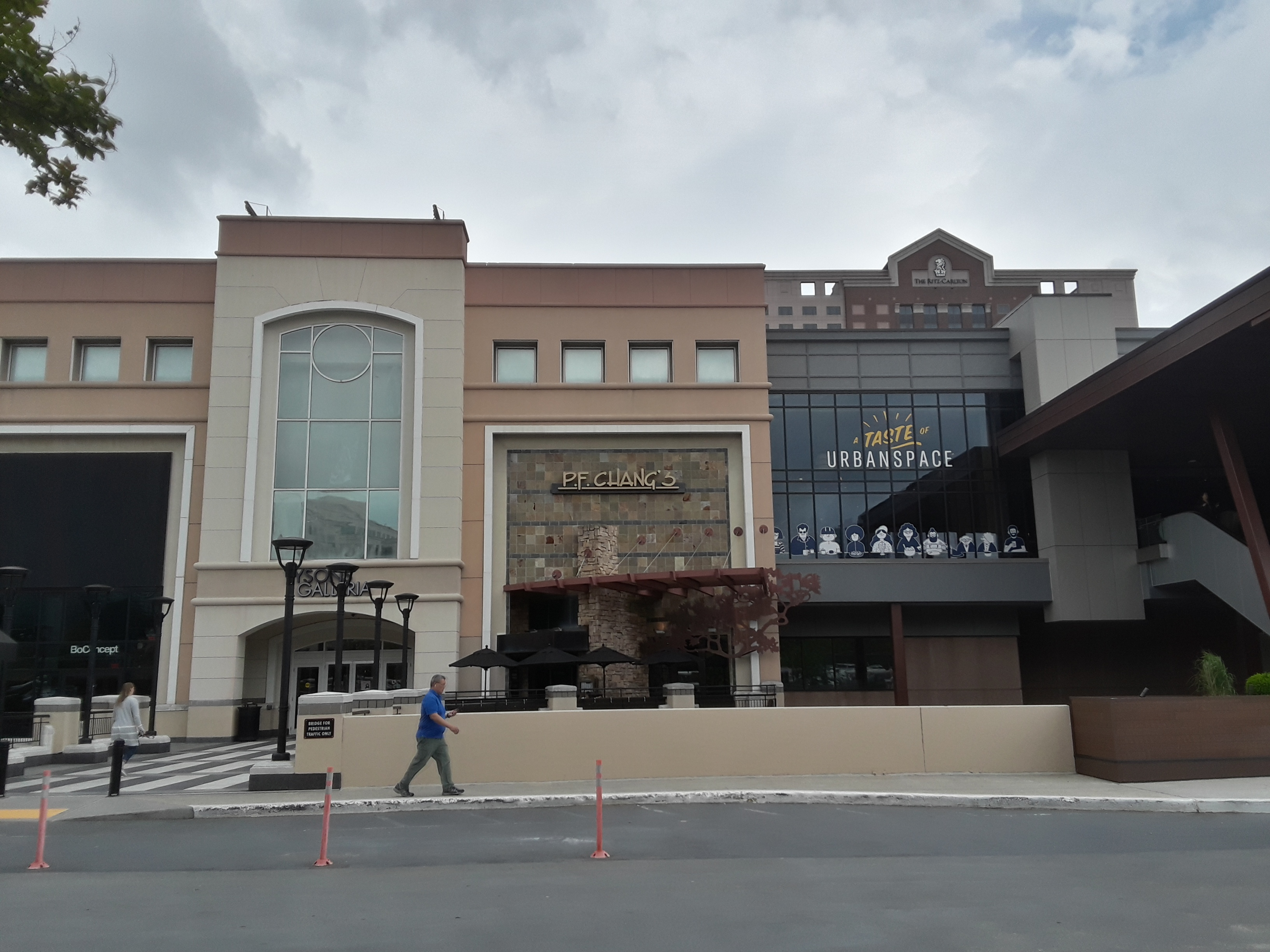
Restaurant storefronts at Tysons Galleria

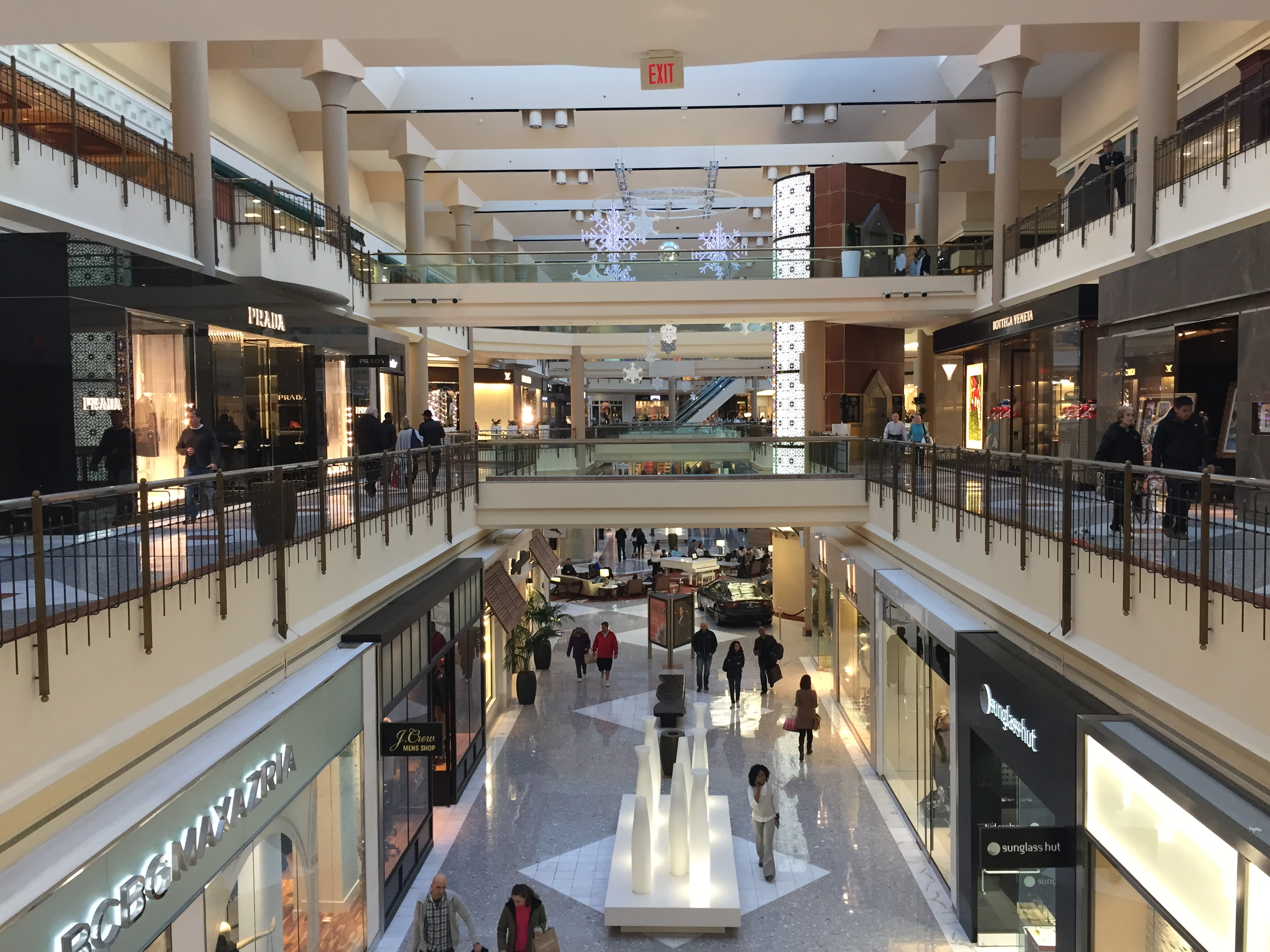
Interior of Tysons Galleria

Tysons Galleria features valet parking and concierge services, including having large purchases delivered and organized into customers' closets. The mall has given consistently big-spending customers reserved parking spaces. The Galleria also has foreign currency exchanges, day spas, security escorts, and taxi services. An adjacent Ritz-Carlton hotel is accessible from inside the mall. The hotel attracts wealthy visitors from Europe, the Middle East, and the Far East, who in turn help fuel sales of the mall's high-end goods.

FAO Schwarz operated a three-level store that closed in 2001. The mall also had one of the original locations of Tiffany & Co.'s Iridesse.

Several designers, including Balenciaga, Burberry, Bottega Veneta, Cartier, Celine, Chanel, Crate & Barrel, David Yurman, Ermenegildo Zegna, Gucci, Louis Vuitton, Prada, Saint Laurent, Salvatore Ferragamo, Tory Burch, Vilebrequin, Van Cleef & Arpels, Tumi and Versace, have some of the only statewide and Baltimore-Washington area boutiques in Tysons Galleria or the largest of the areas locations.

The mall is anchored by Neiman Marcus and has one vacant anchor formerly occupied by Saks Fifth Avenue.

The mall also contains full-service restaurants, such as Wildfire, Yard House, and P.F. Chang's China Bistro.

== See also ==
- Fairfax Square
