= Rick Goings =

American businessman

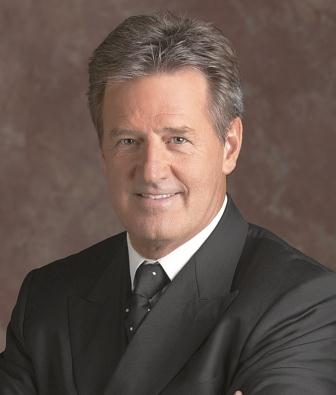
- Born: Everett Vernon Goings; October 13, 1945 (age 80); Wheaton, Illinois
- Occupations: Chairman & Co-Founder, World Federation of Youth Clubs, Chairman of the Board - Rollins College
- Spouse: Susan Porcaro (m. 1998)

Everett Vernon Goings (born October 13, 1945), better known as Rick Goings is Chairman Emeritus of Tupperware Brands. He served as a petty officer in the United States Navy during the Vietnam era. Following this, he founded the fire detector distributor Dynamics, Inc. After his sale of the company, he worked in various positions with Avon, including president of Avon USA. In 1992 he joined Tupperware Worldwide as the CEO.

== Early life ==
Rick Goings was born in an economically challenged family. His first job was as a door-to-door salesman selling Grolier Society encyclopedias. After high school, Goings served in the US Navy as a navigator on the USS Power, a World War II-era destroyer in the Red Sea during the Vietnam War. Goings was a platoon leader out of boot camp, and was honorably discharged from the Navy at the rank of petty officer.

He then attended Guilford College in Greensboro, North Carolina, where he majored in history.

== Dynamics, Inc. ==
While in his senior year of college, Goings founded one of the first direct sales of home fire alarm systems - the "Pyro Sentinel Heat Detection System" distributorship, in the United States. He hired fellow students to work in direct sales for the heat detectors, creating "fire safety crusaders" in their neighborhoods in order to raise awareness for fire safety. At the time fire alarms were not common and smoke detectors hadn't been introduced yet in US homes.

Goings dropped out of college to pursue the company full-time, split up with his partner, and reformed the company in Charlottesville, Virginia as Dynamics, Inc. Goings began to franchise Dynamics, and within a few years the company had 300 locations across the US. He led the company for fifteen years. He then sold his interest in the company.

== Tupperware Brands Corporation ==
Following the sale of Dynamics, Goings began working with Avon Products, Inc. in 1985, where he held several positions including president of Avon Germany, group vice president and senior operating officer for the Pacific Rim, and president of Avon USA.

He joined Tupperware in 1992 as president of Tupperware Worldwide. One of his first actions was to turn the company's attentions to the overseas market, in order to compensate for the increasing difficulty of direct-sales models in the United States. The two markets Goings focused on most were Latin America and Asia, where "Tupperware home party social-networking" proved to be popular in a way that it once was in the United States during the 1960s. Within four years the company was earning 95% of its revenues from outside the US, with revenues of about $1 billion. This led the company to be spun off from its parent company in 1996, with Goings remaining in the position of CEO.

== Boards ==
Goings is Chairman & Co-founder of the World Federation of Youth Clubs. He is a member of the Tennenbaum Capital Partners Advisory Board. Rick is a member of National Board of Smithsonian Institution. He is chair of the Board of Trustees of Rollins College, a former member of the World Economic Forum (WEF), a member of the Board of Executive Advisors for the Yale School of Management's Chief Executive Leadership Institute. He is a former member of the board of directors for SunTrust Bank, N.A., the board of governors for Boys & Girls Clubs of America and of the boards of Reynolds American Inc. (formerly RJR), Premark International, Inc. and RR Donnelley. Goings was an inaugural corporate Impact 10x10x10 Champion for UN Women's HeForShe initiative and a founding member of the organization's Private Sector Leadership Advisory Council.

== Recognition ==
In 2010, Goings was recognized with the Knight of the Legion of Honour award by Nicolas Sarkozy for his dedication to the role of women and children in developing countries. The People's Republic of China awarded Goings the Marco Polo Award for his role in China's economic development and the Boys & Girls Clubs of America awarded him the Herbert Hoover Humanitarian Award, for his work as their national chairman. In 2013 Goings was named CEO of the Year by the Holmes Group.

== Personal life ==
He resides in Windermere, Florida, with his wife, Susan Porcaro-Goings (widow of the late Toto drummer Jeff Porcaro). He says he is traveling 70 percent of his time and practices Transcendental Meditation twice a day. In September 2014, Goings and his wife were awarded the second annual Voice for Women Award for their work to propel women's economic empowerment around the world at Sewall-Belmont House and Museum on Capitol Hill in Washington D.C.

== See also ==
- Tupperware Brands
- Joseph (Joe) Hara
