= Tupperware =

American home products line

- Type: Subsidiary
- Founded: 1946; 80 years ago Leominster, Massachusetts, U.S.
- Founder: Earl Tupper
- Headquarters: Orlando, Florida, U.S.
- Products: Preparation, storage, serving products for the kitchen and home, and beauty products
- Revenue: ▲US$2.26 billion (2017)
- Number of employees: 13,500 (2010)
- Parent: Party Products LLC
- Website: tupperware.com

Tupperware is an American company that manufactures and internationally distributes preparation, storage, and serving containers for the kitchen and home. It was founded in 1942 by Earl Tupper, who developed his first bell-shaped container and introduced the products to the public in 1946.

As of 2007, it was sold by approximately 1.9 million direct salespeople on contract. In 2013, the top marketplace for Tupperware was Indonesia, topping Germany. Indonesia's sales in 2013 were more than $200 million.

In September 2024, when its parent company filed for bankruptcy, it was a wholly owned subsidiary of Tupperware Brands Corporation (TBC). Two months later, it was announced that a company formed by a group of TBC secured lenders, Party Products LLC, had completed the purchase of the brand, as well as certain related operations.

"Tupperware" is often used as generic term for food storage containers, which threatens the validity of its trademark.

== Company history ==
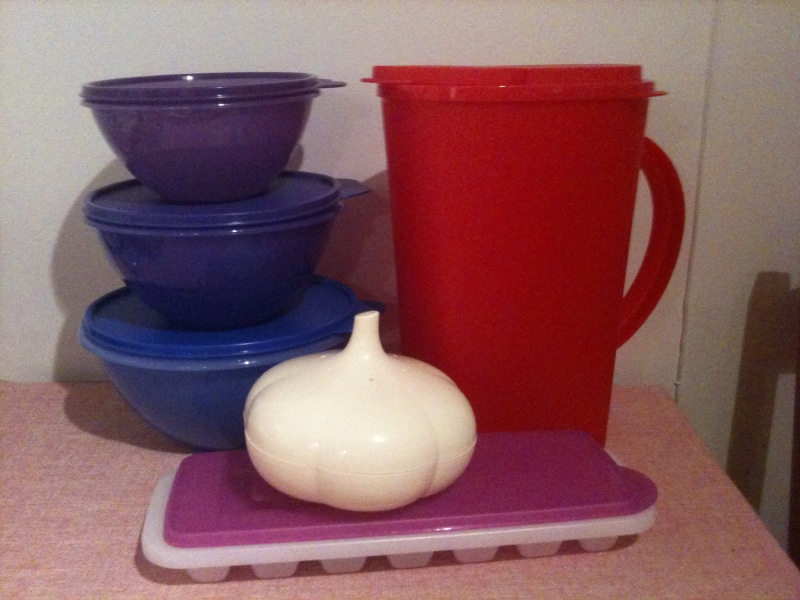
Tupperware containers from 2011

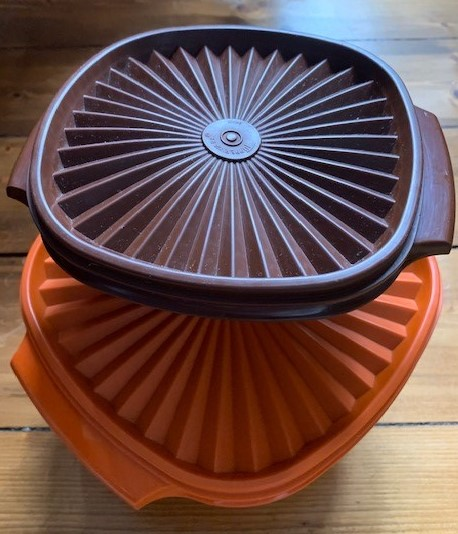
Colorful Tupperware containers

=== Early years ===
Earl Tupper (1907–1983) was a chemist with DuPont who refined polyethylene and developed prototype plasticwares out of it for the company. In 1938 he founded the Tupperware Plastics Company. He created the first Tupperware product in 1946 in Leominster, Massachusetts. The airtight, food-safe plastic containers were targeted to consumers.

Tupperware developed a direct marketing strategy known as the party plan to sell products. The “Tupperware party” enabled women of the 1950s to earn an independent income without holding a regular job. Brownie Wise (1913–1992), a former sales representative of Stanley Home Products, started organizing more of these parties and was soon made vice president of marketing in 1951. Later, she created Tupperware Parties Inc.

During the early 1950s, Tupperware products gained popularity, and sales increased. The company continued the Tupperware parties and rewarded top-selling women.

=== 1960–2000 ===
Tupperware expanded to Europe in 1960 when Tupperware parties were hosted in Weybridge, England, and other locations around the world. A comparison technique called "carrot calling" was used by the representatives wherein they would travel door-to-door in a neighborhood and ask housewives to compare carrots placed in a Tupperware container with anything that they would have ordinarily left them in. These would lead to scheduling of a Tupperware party.

In 1977, Rexall, the owner of the Tupperware brand, sold its namesake drugstores and renamed itself Dart Industries. Dart merged with Kraft Foods to form Dart & Kraft. The company demerged, with the former Dart assets renamed to Premark International. Tupperware Brands was spun off from Premark in 1996.

=== 2001–present ===
Tupperware logo from 1994 to 2024

In 2003 Tupperware closed down operations in the UK and Ireland, citing customer dissatisfaction with their direct sales model. The company relaunched in the UK in mid-2011, and recruited UK staff, but in December the relaunch was canceled.

As of 2007 Tupperware was sold by means of approximately 1.9 million direct salespeople on contract.

In May 2018, the Israeli daily TheMarker reported that Tupperware would withdraw from Israel, leaving 2,000 agents without a job. Tupperware Israel relaunched in December 2020 as an online shop. In March 2021 Tupperware closed down operations in the Netherlands. In August 2022, Tupperware announced it would be leaving the New Zealand market in late 2022.

In 2022 Tupperware faced criticism for continuing its operations and actively hiring in Russia despite the country’s invasion of Ukraine.

On November 2, 2022, after publishing quarterly results, the company said its inability to maintain compliance with its credit agreement raises substantial doubt about its ability to continue as a going concern. The stock value dropped more than 40%. In April 2023 the company warned that there is "substantial doubt about the company's ability to continue as a going concern". The stock price dropped almost 50% on the same day. On April 11, 2023, Tupperware's stock value plummeted to $1.30. Although there was a slight recovery the following day, its sliding sales and increasing debt prompted warnings of permanent company closure unless it receives substantial investment.

As of April 2023 Tupperware had 82 countries listed as places it trades. In May 2023, a financially-ailing Tupperware signed on Moelis & Co. to explore various available strategic options, as it also detected inconsistencies in its prior periods' financial reportings.

On June 1, 2023, Tupperware stopped supplying an independent sales force in the UK and Ireland and moved fully to selling online and via the shopping television channel Ideal World, shortly before Ideal World itself went out of business in early July 2023.

On October 14, 2023, Laurie Ann Goldman became CEO and board director following leadership roles at Spanx, Avon and Guess.

On June 14, 2024, Tupperware announced that it would close its last remaining US manufacturing plant in Hemingway, South Carolina, and shift production to their plant in Lerma in Mexico, with the closure to be completed in January 2025.

On September 16, 2024, Tupperware Brands Corp. announced that it was preparing to file for Chapter 11 bankruptcy protection later in the week after a failed comeback after beneficial sales during the COVID-19 pandemic. The company's stock fell nearly 60% after the announcement. On September 18, Tupperware Brands filed for Chapter 11 bankruptcy protection, with plans to continue operating during the proceedings. Lenders involved are advocating for a foreclosure in order to claim assets. On October 22, with $818 million obligations, it signed a deal with lenders for $23.5 million cash and $63 million debt relief in the United States District Court for the District of Delaware bankruptcy court for approval of Judge Brendan Shannon. In November 2024, the Tupperware brand name was acquired by Party Products LLC, who will allow for Tupperware's operations to continue.

== Tupperware parties ==
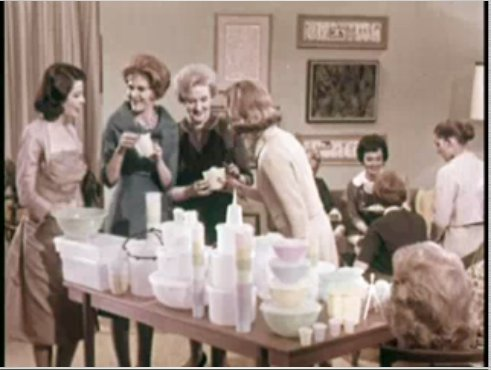
A Tupperware party advertisement from the late 1950s

Tupperware historically has been sold mostly through a party plan. A Tupperware party is hosted by a Tupperware consultant, who invites friends and neighbors into their home to see the product line. Parties also take place in workplaces and other community groups. To stay in touch with its sales force, Tupperware published the monthly magazine Tupperware Sparks. The magazine had snapshots of saleswomen posing with awards and recognition for high sales. To avoid spending money on advertising, Tupperware created events that attracted free publicity.

Reaction among feminist academics to the Tupperware model has been mixed. Some point out that Tupperware provided employment for women who were pregnant or otherwise not guaranteed their position at work due to unequal laws in the workplace. Opposing views argued that the intended gendered product and selling campaign helped keep women restricted to the domestic sphere, and maintained their predominant focus on homemaking.

The multi-level marketing strategy adopted by Tupperware has also been criticized as manipulative. Statistics released by Tupperware showed that 94% of its active distributors remained on the lowest level of the pyramid, with average gross earnings of $653 over the year 2017.

In recent years, Tupperware in North America moved to a new business model which includes more emphasis on direct marketing channels and eliminated its dependency on authorized distributorships. This transition included selling through Target stores in the US and Superstores in Canada with disappointing results. In countries with a focus on marketing through parties (such as Germany, Australia, and New Zealand), Tupperware's market share and profitability continue to decline. In New Zealand, products can also be purchased online without a salesperson.

In China, Tupperware products are sold through franchised "entrepreneurial shopfronts", of which there were 1,900 in 2005.

== Tupperware records and archives ==
Several collections of Tupperware-related archival records, papers, and collections are held by cultural heritage institutions across the United States. The papers of founder Earl S. Tupper are part of the Smithsonian's National Museum of American History and its Archives Center. The records of long-serving Tupperware vice president Brownie Wise are also at the National Museum of American History and its Archives Center. The Jon and Sylvia Boyd Tupperware Films collection at the Smithsonian showcases Tupperware-produced documentaries that chronicle annual 'jubilee' conventions for salespeople, formerly held at the Tupperware Florida headquarters.

== See also ==
- Generic trademark
- Gold party
- Hana Cobi Plastic aka Lock & Lock
- Newell Rubbermaid
- Tub (container)
