= Capital One Hall =

Event venue in Tysons, Virginia

Coordinates: 38°55′31″N 77°12′39″W

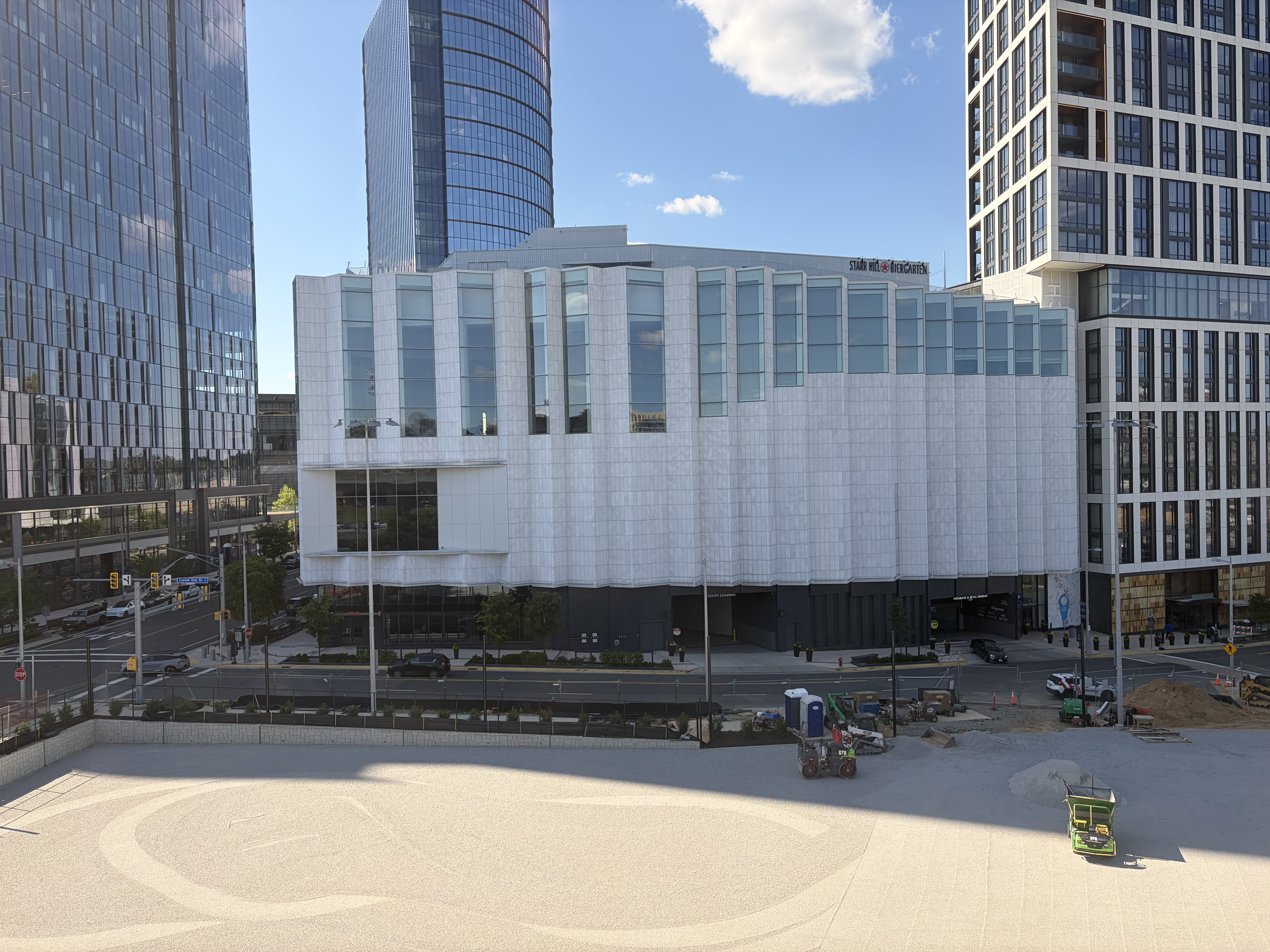
- Capital One Hall viewed from the Silver Line`
- Interactive map of Capital One Hall
- Address: 7750 Capital One Tower Rd; Tysons, Virginia; United States
- Operator: ASM Global
- Capacity: Main Theater: 1,600; Vault Theater: 225
- Public transit: Washington Metro at McLean; Metrobus: A70; Fairfax Connector: 480, 703, 721, 722, 724

Construction
- Opened: October 2021; 5 years ago
- Architects: Hammel, Green and Abrahamson

Website
- www.capitalonehall.com

Capital One Hall is a performing arts center, music hall, and corporate event facility in Tysons, Virginia. The venue offers a wide range of programming, while also serving as a corporate event center for the nearby headquarters of Capital One. It also operates as a cultural event space for the greater Northern Virginia and Washington Metropolitan Area.

Capital One Hall has two theaters: the 1,600-seat Main Theater and the 225-seat black box Vault Theater. The venue boasts a four-story Atrium, designed to fit up to 1,600 people standing or 500 people seated, and a terrace designed to fit up to 450 people standing or 180 people seated

The larger complex also includes a rooftop amphitheater called the Perch.

Capital One Hall opened to the public on October 1, 2021, with a performance featuring singer Josh Groban.

== Performances ==
Capital One hall offers a broad range of programming, including Broadway theater productions, internationally touring musical acts, comedy, and local productions by community groups from the greater Northern Virginia area.

Capital One Hall hosts performances by D.C.-area performing arts organizations including the National Symphony Orchestra, the National Philharmonic and The Washington Ballet.

The venue also offers season passes to its Broadway productions as part of its annual "Broadway in Tysons" series.

Artists and bands such as Gordon Lightfoot, Men at Work, Boz Scaggs, and Night Ranger have performed at the venue.
