= Gold party =

A gold party is similar to a Tupperware party in that a small group gathers at a host's home to sell their gold jewelry to a gold buyer. They were popular as people looked for ways to raise money during the Late-2000s recession. The buyer, generally, weighs and tests jewelry and other items for party guests. The testing includes a variety of means, including acid tests, magnet tests, and other methods to determine gold content. If a guest decides to sell the items, the buyer pays her at the party, and the item is sent to a refinery to be melted down. The host receives a commission for each sale, usually around 10%, but sometimes up to 87%.

Consumer advocates advise attendees to value their gold before attending a party, as valuations given at gold parties are not always the best possible price, and can be affected by the profit margins required by the two middlemen (the host and the buyer) between the seller and the refinery.
