= Martin + Osa =

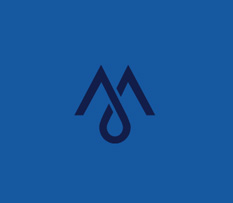
- Company type: Division
- Industry: Retail
- Founded: September 6, 2006
- Defunct: 2010
- Fate: Closed
- Parent: American Eagle Outfitters, Inc.

Martin + Osa (Martin & Osa) was a brand of clothing and stores developed by American Eagle Outfitters. The store's name and inspiration came from Martin and Osa Johnson, a husband and wife team from southeast Kansas who explored Africa and the South Pacific Islands, chronicling their travels in photographs and diaries.

Martin + Osa targeted 25 to 40-year-old customers and offered classic and contemporary clothing, with an emphasis on denim.

The first retail store opened at Tysons Corner Center in McLean, Virginia, on September 6, 2006. Stores were designed by Michael Neumann Architecture (MNA) in New York City. ranging in size from 6,500 to 7,500 square feet (700 m^{2}).

On March 10, 2010, American Eagle Outfitters announced it would close down its 28 Martin + Osa stores and online store. Although performance improved from fiscal 2008, management determined that the brand was not achieving performance levels that warrant further investment. In fiscal 2009, Martin + Osa generated an after-tax loss of approximately $44 million, including a non-cash impairment charge of approximately $11 million, net of tax. The company chose to focus its efforts and resources on the American Eagle family of brands including, AE, aerie and 77kids, estimated to have greater potential of creating long-term shareholder value.

As of late July 2010, the Martin + Osa online store and all retail stores had closed. For a time customers could still visit the Martin + Osa website for gift card and e-gift card balance look up, order tracking and customer service contact information. This functionality is now disabled and the website redirects to American Eagle.

In 2016 the Martin and Osa Johnson Safari Museum acquired the Martin + Osa trademarks.
