= Armand Dupree =

Sales company

Coordinates: 28.3463°N 81.4020°W

- Industry: Direct selling
- Headquarters: Orlando, Florida, United States
- Products: cosmetics, personal care products
- Website: Tupperware Brands

Armand Dupree is a direct selling company based in the United States and owned by Tupperware Brands. The brand has gained recognition in Mexico for over 28 years and was distributed in that market by Fuller Cosméticos. Armand Dupree operates primarily through a direct sales model, leveraging independent representatives to market its products to consumers outside traditional retail channels.

== Products ==
Armand Dupree offers a range of products in categories such as personal care, cosmetics, fragrances, skin care, and home care. While the brand initially entered the Mexican market, it has expanded and can now be found in several countries including Argentina, Brazil, The Philippines, The United States, and Uruguay.
