= Fairfax Square =

Coordinates: 38°54′44.9″N 77°13′26.5″W

Fairfax Square is an upscale mixed-use development located directly south of Tysons Corner Center across Leesburg Pike in Tysons Corner, Virginia. It includes 400,000 sq ft (37,160 m^{2}) of Class A office space, primarily occupied by financial tenants such as American Express, Merrill Lynch, and New York Life, and high-end ground-floor retail among its three identical high-rises. Fairfax Square was designed by Skidmore, Owings & Merrill. Its buildings are clad in Brazilian granite, and its lobbies are finished with Italian marble and wood paneling. Ground was broken for the development in 1988. The complex replaced a Kmart store and its parking lot.

When it opened in 1990, the Tiffany & Co. store at Fairfax Square was the largest outside of New York with 14,500 sq ft (1,350 m^{2}) of retail space. Hermès has its only Washington metropolitan area store in Fairfax Square and doubled its retail space after a reopening in 2006 due to store consistently outperforming the rest of the U.S. market. The Tiffany store in this location is twice as large as its newer counterpart on Wisconsin Avenue. Fendi opened its fourth store in the nation at Fairfax Square, but it has closed; Fendi has opened a boutique within Saks Fifth Avenue in Chevy Chase, Maryland. Fendi does, however, have a Fendi Casa showroom nearby in Washington. The Equinox fitness facility replaced an 8-screen movie theater, which closed in 2007, shortly after a 16-screen theater opened in Tyson's Corner Center.

The following stores are located in Fairfax Square:

- Equinox Fitness & Spa
- Hermès
- Elizabeth Arden Red Door Salons
- Tiffany & Co.
- Joon Restaurant & Lounge

This location should not be confused with another older development, also named Fairfax Square, located in the City of Fairfax and consisting of a small amount of office and retail space.

== See also ==
- Tysons Galleria – an upscale shopping mall located directly north of Tysons Corner Center
