= Laurie Ann Goldman =

American investor

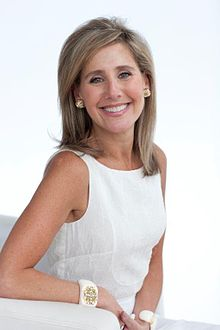
- Goldman in 2016
- Born: Clarksdale, Mississippi, U.S.
- Education: University of Texas at Austin; Tulane University
- Occupation: Businessperson
- Spouse: Jonathan Goldman (married 1991–2018)
- Children: 3

Laurie Ann Goldman is an American businessperson and investor. She is best known for serving as the chief executive officer of Spanx from 2002 to 2014 and is the CEO of Audien Hearing.

== Early life and education ==
Goldman was born in Clarksdale, Mississippi, to Donna Ruth and Julius Lazard Levy Jr. Her father was a general surgeon, board chairperson, and a professor of anatomy at Tulane Medical School. Goldman is Jewish on both her parents' sides. She was raised with her two brothers, Richard and Andrew, in New Orleans, Louisiana.

Goldman attended the Isidore Newman School in New Orleans, where she was on the cross country running team. She then attended Tulane University and the University of Texas, where she was a member of the sorority Alpha Epsilon Phi. She attended the Moody School of Communications and graduated with honors. Her first job was as a special events coordinator for Maison Blanche.

== Career ==
In 2013, Goldman started working in the Macy's advertising department on new brands, media relations, and store event planning.

Goldman worked for 10 years at The Coca-Cola Company in marketing roles including as head of the worldwide licensing division in 54 countries. During this time, she also worked on branding Coca-Cola for three Olympic Games, as well as a world cup.

During her maternity leave from Coca-Cola, Goldman met Spanx founder Sara Blakely's then-boyfriend at the Saks Fifth Avenue in Atlanta in 2001. Goldman was specifically looking for a Spanx product. The pair exchanged contact details, and Goldman went on to advise the company on supply management. In 2002, Goldman became the CEO of Spanx. She had previously advised founder Sara Blakely until she was named CEO. As CEO, Goldman worked to bring Spanx products to 11,500 locations across the world, including standalone Spanx stores, and to the runway at New York Fashion Week. Business Insider named Goldman one of their "Sexiest CEOs Alive". At the time that Goldman joined Spanx, it only had five employees, though at the conclusion of her her career with Spanx, it was a "billion dollar worldwide business". She exited the position in 2014.

In August 2018, Goldman joined the board of New Avon and took over as their CEO in January 2019. While there, Goldman led the sale of New Avon to LG.

Goldman was named CEO of Tupperware Brands in October 2023. She was hired to navigate the company through a Chapter 11 bankruptcy filing in September 2024. Goldman facilitated the sale of the business and implemented turnaround efforts that included a long-term omni-channel strategy and an agreement with its lenders to restructure its debt obligations.

In 2026, Goldman was appointed the CEO of Audien Hearing, which was founded by Ishan Patel, Dylan Garber, and Zack Hubbard. Goldman joined them in order to build and scale the over-the-counter hearing aid brand, that is distributed to Walmart, Target, Walgreens and CVS, as well as online.

=== Corporate boards and investing ===
Before taking over as New Avon CEO, Goldman founded her own investing and advisory firm, LA Ventures. Goldman is on the board of directors for Guess, ServiceMaster, and Joe & The Juice. Previously, she served on the boards of Francesca's, Enviroscent, and Insightpool. Goldman is also an investor in ThirdLove.

In 2022, Laurie Ann Goldman was named the chair of the Board of Directors of Claire's.

== Philanthropy and interests ==
Goldman is on the board of the Carter Center, the Anti-Defamation League, and the Atlanta Committee For Progress. She is involved with Citymeals-on-Wheels, Women Corporate Directors, The Committee of 200, and Chief Executives Organization.

She was previously on the boards of the American Jewish Committee, the Jewish Federation, and Pace Academy.

Goldman has been a professional speaker for The Commonwealth Institute, the Fortune Most Powerful Women summit, Girl Scouts of the USA, MAX Awards, and the Tulane Business Forum. In June 2018, she spoke at the Metropolitan Museum of Art on collecting art and jewelry at the "Women and the Critical Eye" event.

Goldman is an avid reader, enjoying the genres of "historical fiction, self-help books and books with strong heroines". She named her poodle Lou among her favorite things.

== Accolades ==
Goldman received the National Human Relations and Leadership Award from the American Jewish Committee. She received the Human Relations award alongside Madeleine Albright in New York City presented by David Harris. She was listed as one of Ad Age's Top 50 Marketing Executives and was a Jewish Women International honoree.

Goldman carried the Olympic flame through Atlanta during the 1996 Summer Olympics.
