= Party plan =

Direct selling method

The party plan is a method of marketing products by hosting what is presented as a social event at which products will be offered for sale. It is a form of direct selling. The primary system for generating sales leads for home party plan sales is the home party itself: the salesperson uses the home party business model as a source for future business by asking attendees if they would like to host selling parties, too.

Direct selling through the party plan typically uses multi-level marketing (salesperson is paid for selling and for sales made by people they recruit or sponsor) rather than single-level marketing (salesperson is paid only for the sales they make themself).

This plan has been used primarily to sell items whose main appeal is to women by women, such as kitchen utensils, home decor items, jewelry, cosmetics, handbags, and similar products. Recent additions to the field include lingerie, wine, and sex toys. Sometimes a combination party is held, at which a wide variety of such merchandise is offered for sale.

== How it works ==
In this system, representatives of the sales organization, usually women, approach other women about hosting a social event in their homes during which a product will be demonstrated and offered for sale to guests. In consideration, they will be given hostess gifts and a portion of the proceeds from the amount of goods sold. Frequently all in attendance will be given a token item of nominal value as an incentive to attend.

At the event, the salesperson displays and demonstrates various products. She then takes orders from attendees. The salesperson is almost always paid solely a commission on sales. If the salesperson has recruited other sales people into the organization, then she also receives a commission based on her recruits' sales.

== History ==
The party plan is regarded as primarily the invention of Norman W. Squires, who developed it for Stanley Home Products in Westfield, Massachusetts, founded by Stanley Beveridge and Catherine O'Brien in the mid-1930s. Mr. Beveridge and Ms. O'Brien were former employees of the Fuller Brush Company, which sold its products with door-to-door salespersons.

Tupperware further developed the party plan to sell products. The “Tupperware party” enabled women of the 1950s to earn an independent income without holding a regular job. Brownie Wise (1913–1992), a former sales representative of Stanley Home Products, started organizing more of these parties and was soon made vice president of marketing in 1951. Later, she created Tupperware Parties Inc.

During the early 1950s, Tupperware products gained popularity, and sales increased. The company continued the Tupperware parties and rewarded top-selling women.

== Criticism ==
The party plan is criticized for exploiting social conventions and pressuring "guests" into buying things they do not want.

Purse parties that are not done through a dedicated program by the manufacturer differ, however, from these other parties in that the merchandise at these parties often consists of counterfeit knock-offs of popular, name-brand purses. Merchandise at American purse parties is usually bought in bulk from smugglers in New York's Chinatown or in Los Angeles' garment district and sold to unsuspecting customers at a significantly higher price, although still lower than the retail price of the legitimate product. These inferior smuggled goods have been linked to organized crime and the funding of terrorism, so purse parties have become of interest to law enforcement. Selling such purses, with an imitation designer label, is a US federal crime, even if the seller tells the buyer that the purse is a fake.
