= Glebe Road Line =

Bus route in Washington, D.C., United States

A70
- Glebe Road Line

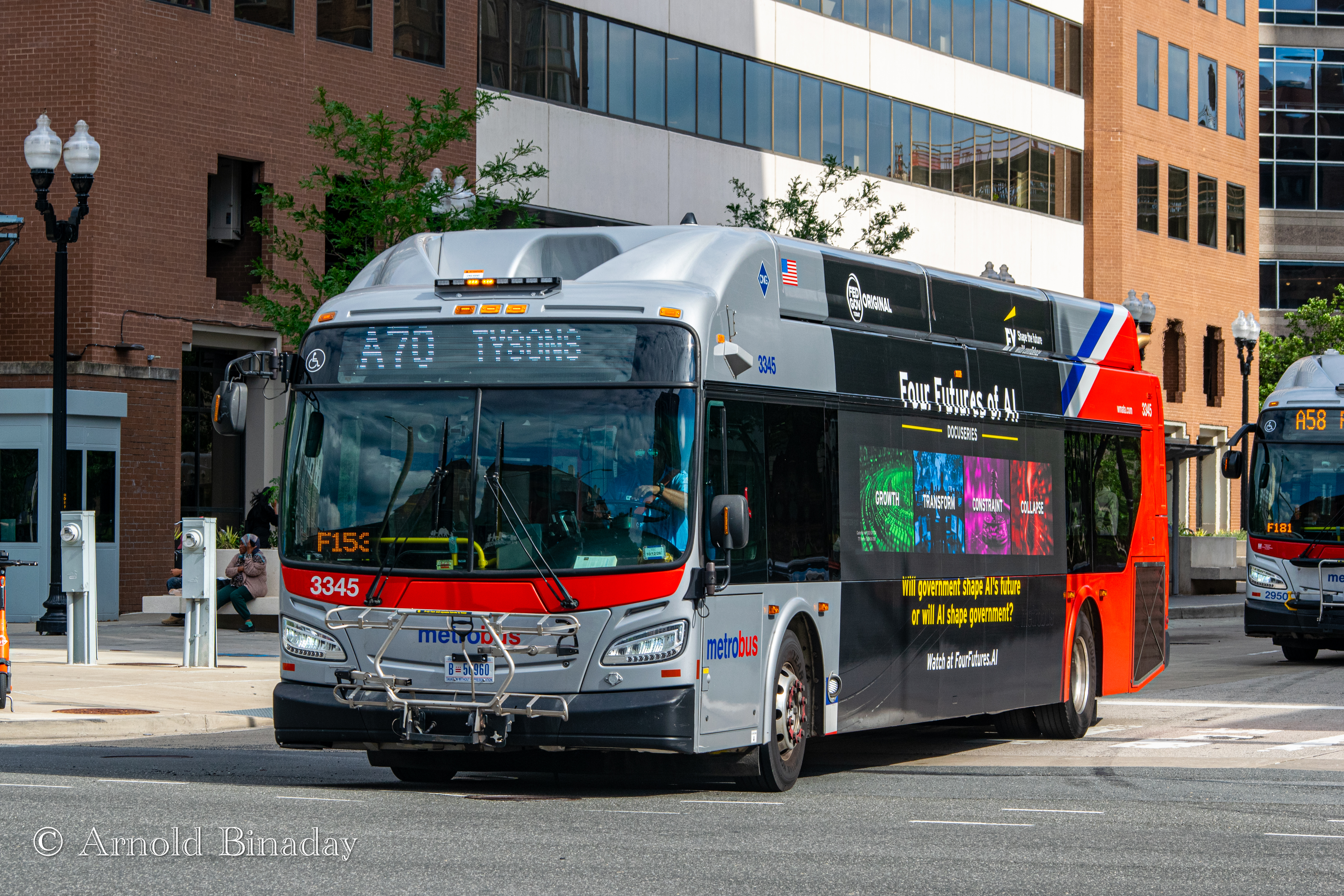
- Route A70 at Ballston–MU

Overview
- System: Metrobus
- Operator: Washington Metropolitan Area Transit Authority
- Garage: Four Mile Run
- Livery: Local
- Status: In Service
- Began service: 1934
- Ended service: 23C: March 30, 2014; 23A, 23B, 23T: June 29, 2025

Route
- Locale: Fairfax County, Arlington County, Alexandria
- Communities served: Tysons, McLean, Rock Springs, Lee Heights, Waycroft–Woodlawn, Ballston, Buckingham, Alcova Heights, Douglas Park, Nauck, Shirlington, Parkfairfax, North Ridge, Arlington Ridge, Aurora Highlands, Alexandria, Potomac Yard
- Landmarks served: Tysons Corner Center, Tysons station, Capital One Hall, McLean station, Marymount University, Ballston station, Ballston Quarter, Potomac Yard station
- Start: Tysons Corner Center; Ballston station
- Via: Dolley Madison Boulevard, Old Dominion Drive, Glebe Road, South Kenmore Street, Richmond Highway
- End: Potomac Yard station

Service
- Level: Daily
- Frequency: 15-60 minutes (Weekdays); 20-60 minutes (Weekends)
- Operates: Weekdays: 5:12 AM – 12:07 AM; Weekends: 6:00 AM – 12:30 AM
- Ridership: 70,518 (23A, FY 2025); 382,766 (23B, FY 2025); 477,768 (23T, FY 2025)
- Transfers: SmarTrip only
- Timetable: Glebe Road Line

The Glebe Road Line, designated Route A70, is a daily bus route operated by the Washington Metropolitan Area Transit Authority between Tysons Corner Center or Ballston station of the Orange and Silver lines of the Washington Metro and Potomac Yard station of the Yellow and Blue lines of the Washington Metro.

The A70 line trips are roughly 15–60 minutes during the weekdays, and 20–60 minutes during the weekends. This line provides service from Tysons in Fairfax County to Ballston in Arlington County and Potomac Yard in the City of Alexandria. The full route from Potomac Yard to Tysons takes roughly 60 minutes to complete, while short trips from Potomac Yard to Ballston takes roughly 30 minutes to complete.

== Route description and service ==
The A70 operate out of Four Mile Run Division seven days a week. The A70 runs the full route between Tysons Corner Center and Potomac Yard, through the neighborhoods such as Tysons, McLean, Rock Springs, Buckingham, Nauck, Avalon Bay, Arlington Ridge and Alexandria. However, some A70 trips alternate between Potomac Yard and Ballston station.

== History ==
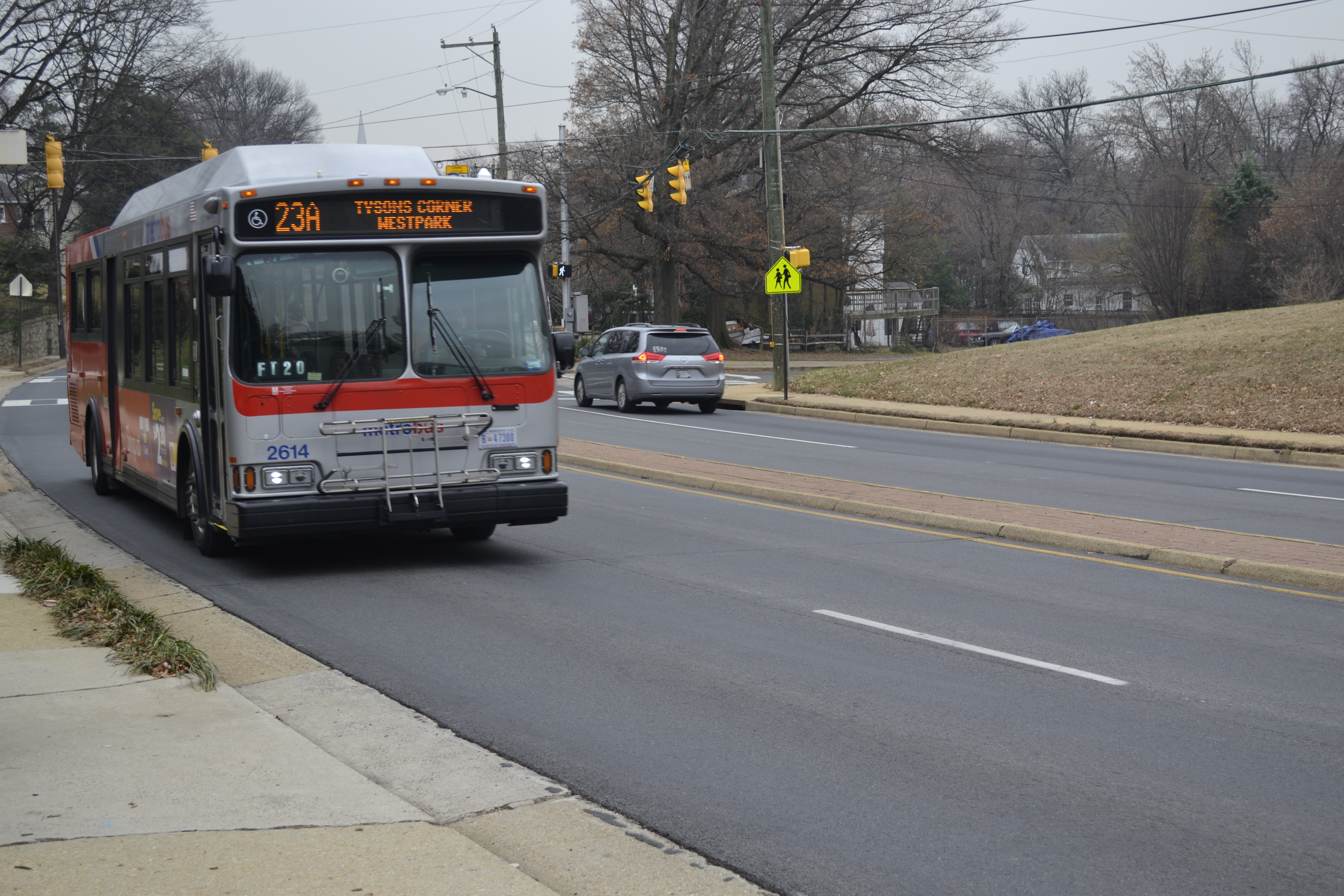
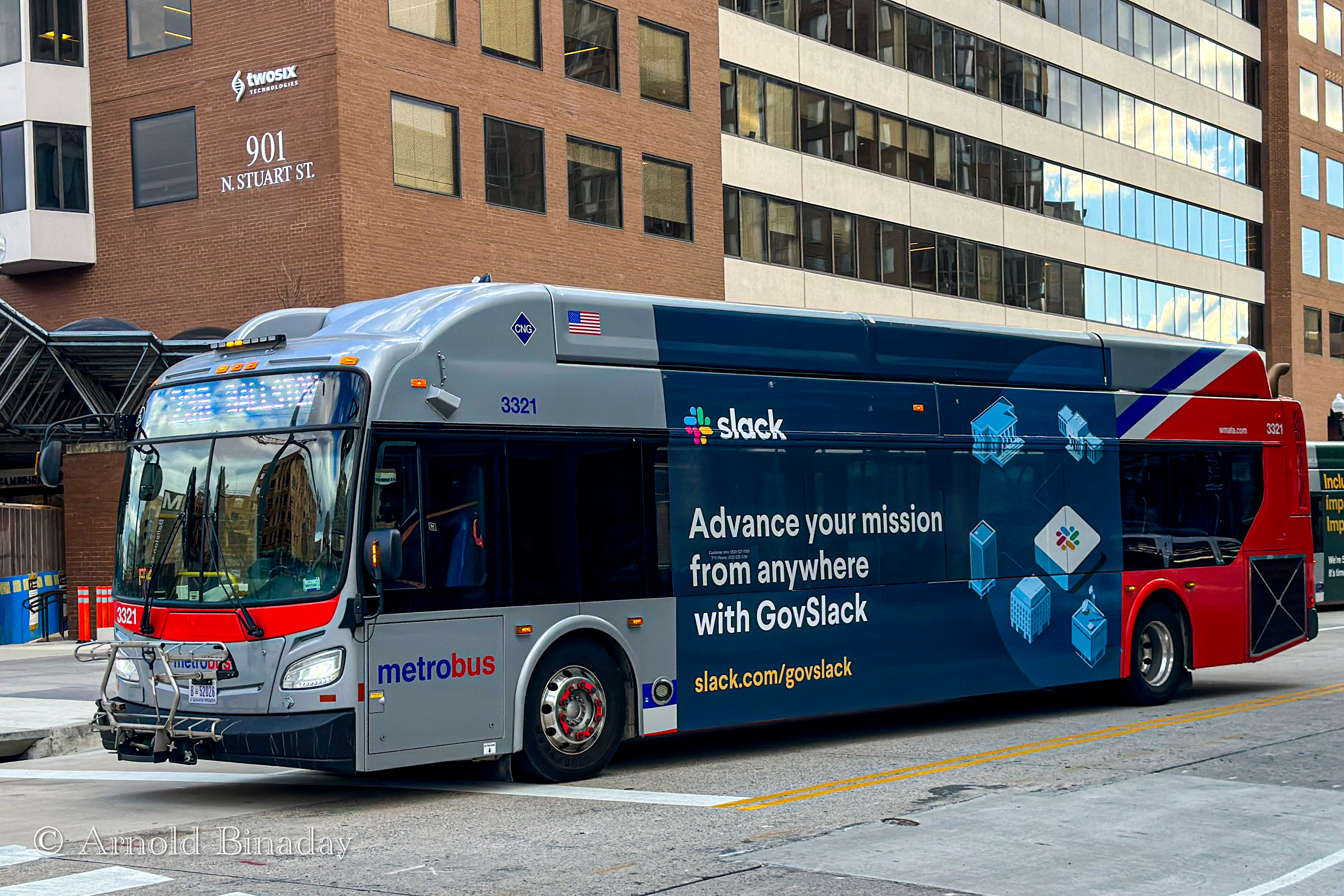
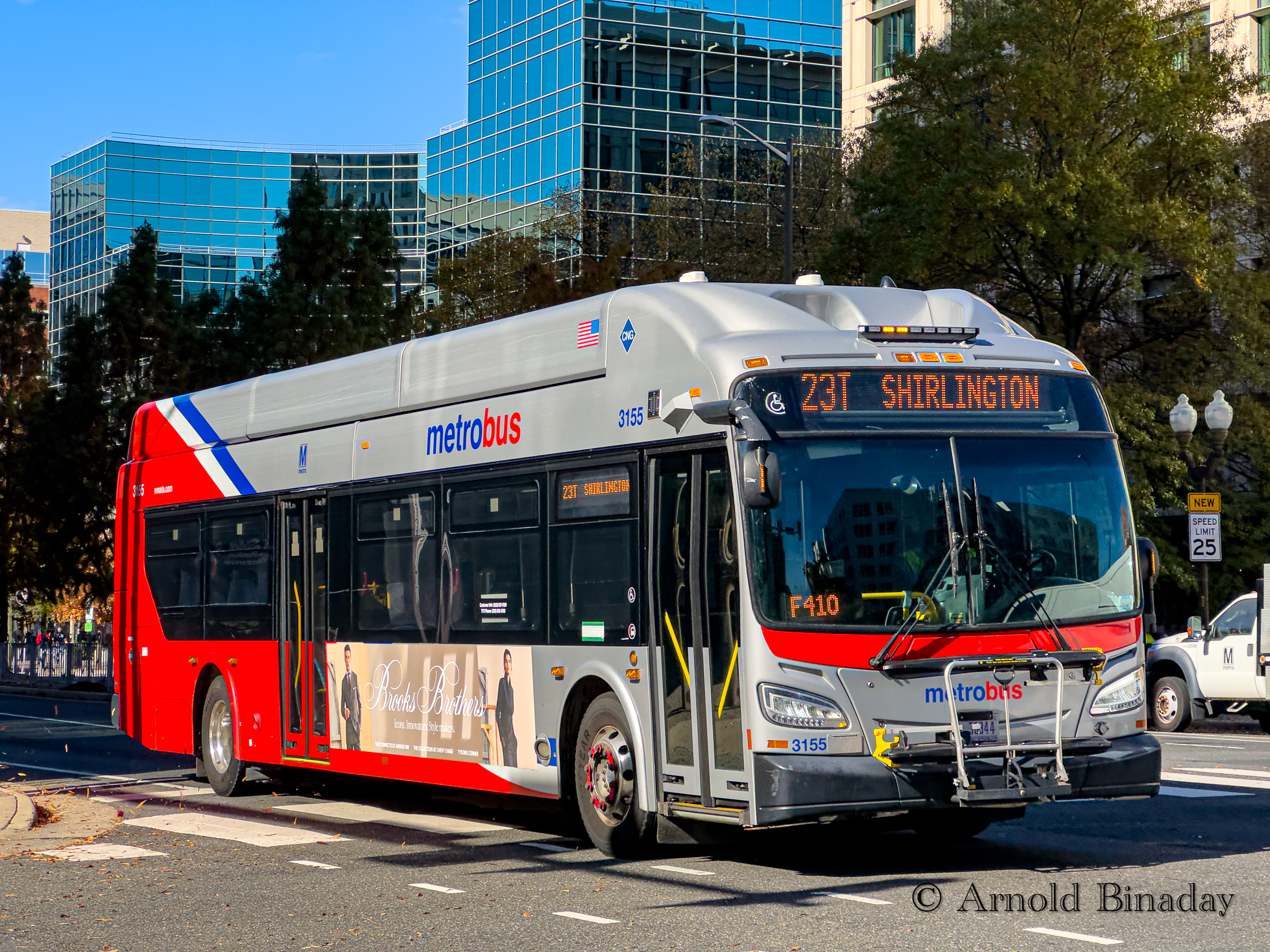
Former Routes 23A, 23B, and 23T.

The Glebe Road Line was introduced in 1934, as the route was part of the Washington Virginia & Maryland Coach Company. It was later operated by WMATA in 1973, when it acquired all routes from the WV&M.

From 1973 to 2025, the Glebe Road Line was renamed the McLean–Crystal City Line, which consists of all 23 line. Some 23 routes were split into different lines, to run as a sister line which brings faster service between rush hours. The 23 line runs along Dolley Madison Boulevard, Old Dominion Drive, and Glebe Road, connecting to Fairfax and Arlington counties and Alexandria.

Route 23A initially started as a daily service route, which runs the full route all day. Route 23C was added to operate between the CIA headquarters and Crystal City, although, select 23C trips terminates at the Village at Shirlington. The 23C only operates during rush hour, bringing faster service between the neighborhood of McLean and Crystal City. Starting on September 24, 2005, bus transfers from Langley are no longer accepted due to security restrictions. The 23C bus time was not affected following the addition of the transfer restriction.

Service changes to the McLean–Crystal City Line wasn't changed until March 30, 2014. The 23A now ends at Tysons Corner Center instead of the Tysons-Westpark Transit Station. The 23A was also rerouted from Chain Bridge Road, to Dolley Madison Boulevard, to bring new service for the Silver Line, which opened on July 26, 2014. Two new routes was added to the line, the 23B & 23T. The 23B and 23T replaced the 23A rush hour service, although neither the two routes serves Langley resulting the discontinuation of the 23C. The remaining 23A portion between Tysons-Westpark Transit Station and Tysons Corner Center was served by route 23W of the Westpark Shuttle Line to serve as a temporary route to run through Tysons Galleria until the Silver Line opens. Since 2016, the 23B and 23T runs on daily service, as the 23A runs on late nights and early mornings.

In 2010 during WMATA's FY2011 budget, WMATA proposed to eliminate route 23C and replace it with route 23A. This was due to bus transfer being restricted at Langley, as riders will have to stop at Old Dominion Drive and Chain Bridge Road to transfer to the 15K or 15L of the Chain Bridge Road Line.

With the 23C being proposed to be converted to the 23A, service at Douglas Park, which operates via Walter Reed Drive and Arlington Mill Drive, would be discontinued. Arlington Transit route 77 will continue to provide service on Douglas Park, following the same path as the 23C, although ART 77 will split on South Glebe Road to continue straight towards Court House station.

In 2013, WMATA proposed to reconstruct the 23 line, by revising the 23A and add a new route, the 23T. The 23A will be rerouted to operate via Dolley Madison Boulevard instead of Chain Bridge Road, to serve Salona Village Shopping Center at McLean. With the new Silver Line service planned to open in 2014, the 23A would serve McLean station and Tysons Corner station (now Tysons station), however, it will now terminate at Tysons Corner Shopping Center, no longer serving Tysons-Westpark Transit Station via Tysons Galleria. Since route 23C was still in service during the proposal, it was omitted from the reconstructive plan for the 23 line. Although the 15K and 15L was still mentioned as an alternate route for Langley, as both routes operates via Chain Bridge Road where the 23A will no longer operate, the 23C is most likely being proposed to be eliminated.

The reason why WMATA planned these changes was to clear up bus bunching with Fairfax Connector on Chain Bridge Road, as those routes operates nearly the same path as the 23A.

To make way for the Silver Line, the 23A was truncated from Tysons-Westpark Transit Station to Tysons Corner Center March 30, 2014. 23B & 23T were introduced March 30, 2014 replacing the 23C. Alternate service to Langley is provided by routes 15K and 15L at the neighborhood of McLean. A temporary 23W was added to serve as a shuttle bus between Tysons-Westpark Transit Station and Tysons Corner Center, until the Silver line opens. The 23W runs under the Westpark Shuttle Line.

Starting on June 26, 2016, weekday middays, evenings & weekends was added to routes 23B & 23T, replacing most of the route 23A service. 23A now operates only during the early mornings and late nights.

Due to the West Glebe Road bridge construction, service will be rerouted via West Glebe Road at the City of Alexandria on December 30, 2018. Routes 23A and 23B no longer operates through Avalon Bay at South Glebe Road.

In response to the COVID-19 pandemic, routes 23A, 23B, and 23T went on major service modification to simplify routes. The line operated on its Sunday schedule during the pandemic. The 23A, 23B and 23T weekend service was also suspended to limit its service. WMATA later announced to restore the line on August 23, 2020 as part of the Metro's COVID-19 Recovery Plan. However, some changes were made on the line, with the 23A operating on full weekdays, and the 23B and 23T only operating during weekends. This marks the 23A operating on full day for the first time since 2016, when the 23A was replaced by the 23B and 23T. No route segment changes was made, as the 23A retains the same intervals and same stops as the late night schedules.

On September 10, 2020 as part of its FY2022 proposed budget, WMATA proposed to reduce all weekend frequencies on routes 23A, 23B, and 23T service in order to reduce costs and low federal funds.

On June 6, 2021, all Route 23B and 23T weekday service was restored, with the 23A reverting back to early morning and late night hours. Service on the 23B was also extended to 2:00 AM.

On September 5, 2021, the line was increased to operate every 20 minutes daily.

Due to rising cases of the COVID-19 Omicron variant, the line was reduced to its Saturday service on weekdays. Full weekday service resumed on February 7, 2022.

As part of WMATA's Better Bus Redesign beginning on June 29, 2025, the line retained its routing between Tysons Corner Center and South Glebe Road, but was modified to operate along Richmond Highway and serve Potomac Yard station and discontinue service to Crystal City and Shirlington. The line was also renamed into the A70, having trips alternate ending between Ballston–MU station and Potomac Yard.

== Incidents ==
- On October 4, 2010, a pick-up truck ran into the side of a 23A bus on South Glebe Road near the interchange with I-395. Two people from the truck were sent to a hospital with no injuries reported on the bus.
