= Brownie Wise =

American businesswoman (1913–1992)

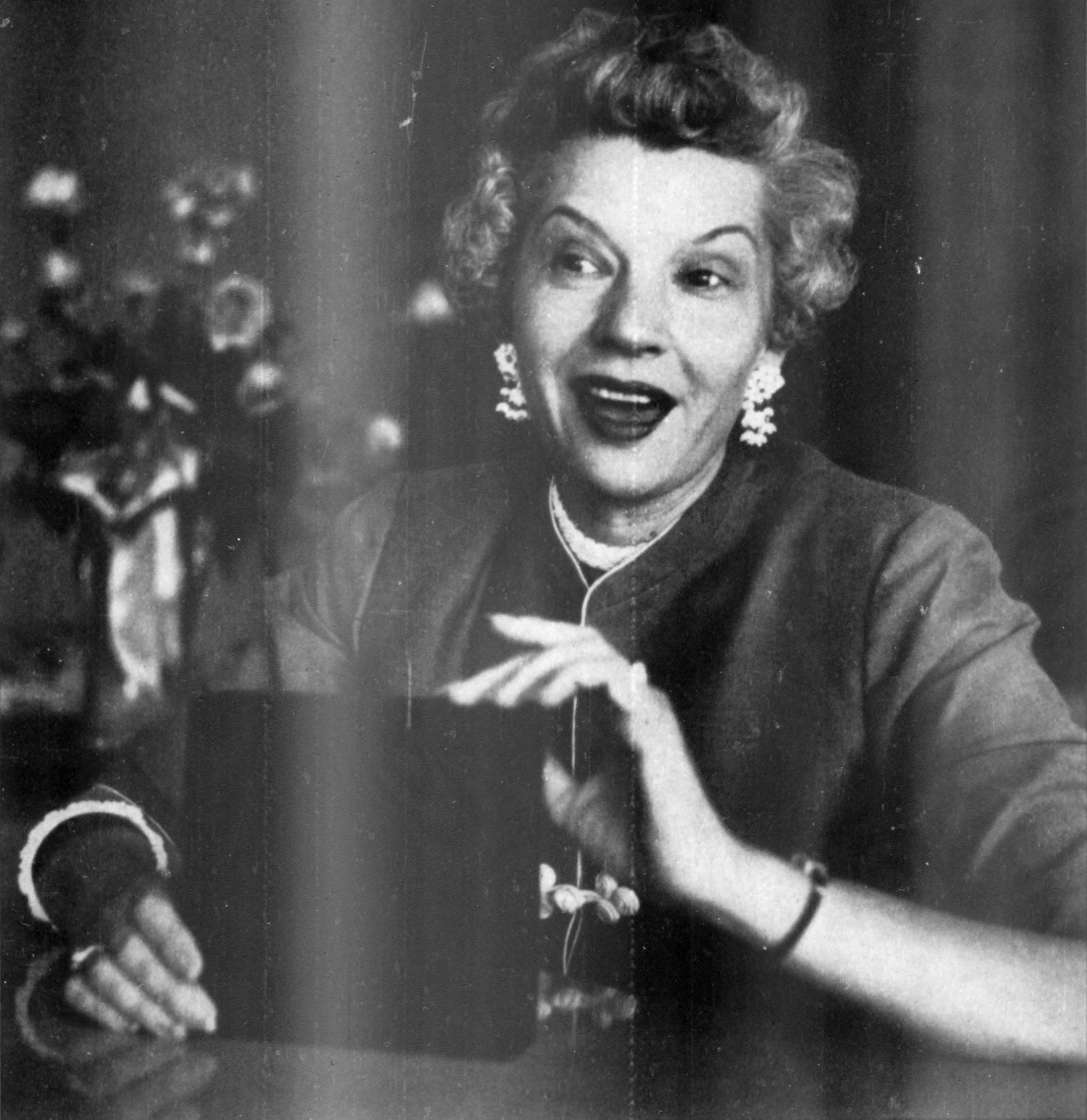
- Wise in 1954
- Born: Brownie Mae Humphrey; May 25, 1913; Buford, Georgia, U.S.
- Died: September 24, 1992 (aged 79); Kissimmee, Florida, U.S.
- Occupation: Businesswoman
- Known for: Tupperware sales

Brownie Wise (née Humphrey; May 25, 1913 – September 24, 1992) was a pioneering American saleswoman largely responsible for the success of the home products company Tupperware, through her development of the "party plan" system of marketing. She initially worked as a salesperson for Stanley Home Products to supplement her income, before switching to selling Tupperware. Wise was vice president of Tupperware Home Parties between 1951 and 1958 when she was fired by Tupperware's founder Earl Tupper.

== Early life ==
Wise was born Brownie Mae Humphrey on May 25, 1913, in Buford, Georgia, to Jerome and Rose Stroud Humphrey. When Wise was two years old, her parents divorced, making her mother a single parent. Her mother worked as an organizer for a hat makers' union, often traveling for months at a time, leaving Wise in the care of her aunt. Wise dropped out of school in her teens, and by the age of fourteen was delivering speeches at union rallies. She met her future husband, Robert W. Wise, at the Texas Centennial Exposition in 1936. After marrying later that year, they moved to Detroit, where their only child, Jerry, was born in 1938. Robert was often violent; in one case, he threw a bottle of acid at his mother-in-law. Their marriage lasted less than five years before Brownie filed for divorce and was awarded custody of her son.

== Career ==
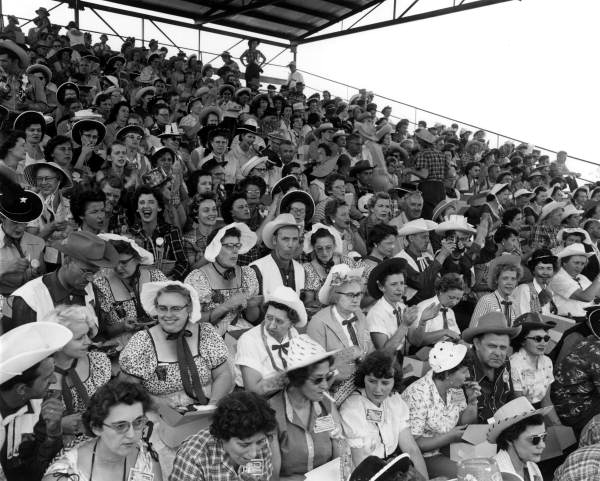
Tupperware's Jubilee event in 1955, in Orange County, Florida

After her divorce, Wise moved to Dearborn, Michigan, where she lived with her mother. During World War II, they turned their attic into a living space for airmen. At the war's height, their basement was used as a first-aid clinic for injured soldiers. Wise worked as an executive secretary at Bendix Aviation, an aircraft manufacturing company, and was a columnist for The Detroit News, writing under the pen name "Hibiscus". After the war ended, Wise started working as a salesperson for Stanley Home Products using the party plan marketing system. Eventually, Wise wanted to work as an executive in the company, but its founder, Frank Beveridge, told her not to "waste her time", informing her that management was "no place for a woman".

After leaving Stanley Home Products, she found Tupperware to be a product with broad appeal and began selling it at home parties. Wise urged her distributors to demonstrate the products to potential customers, even throwing containers to show their durability. By October 1949, Wise had recruited 19 dealers to work with her in Detroit. In 1949, Wise and her sales team sold over $150,000 ($1,708,322 in 2021) of Tupperware, more than any store, and Wise was offered distribution rights to Florida. Wise moved to Fort Lauderdale, where she set up a company named Patio Parties. Earl Tupper, the founder of Tupperware, invited Wise to be vice president of Tupperware Home Parties in 1951. On Wise's suggestion, Tupperware was removed from stores and exclusively sold using the party plan.

Tupperware's sales in 1952 were over $2 million, a significant increase from the previous year. That year Wise was paid a salary of $20,933 ($213,606 in 2021), and the company bought a lakeside house for her near its headquarters in Kissimmee. Starting in 1954, Wise organized Jubilee, an annual sales conference where top-performing saleswomen would be awarded expensive gifts. Each Jubilee had its theme; for example, the 1954 event was themed around the Wild West, featuring a "Big Dig" where participants could dig up items like jewellery and televisions. The same year, Wise was the first woman to appear on the cover of BusinessWeek. Wise was also a writer for the monthly company magazine Tupperware Sparks.

In 1957, Wise published her autobiography Best Wishes, Brownie Wise. This, along with Wise receiving credit for Tupperware's success in the media, estranged her from Tupper. Wise was accused of "undermining the company's image" when she reportedly used a Tupperware container as a dog dish, and she was forced out of the company by Tupper in January 1958. She filed a lawsuit against the company for $1.6 million for breach of contract, eventually settling for $30,000. Wise owned no stock and many of her possessions, including her Florida house, were company property. Tupper removed all mentions of Wise from company history and buried remaining copies of her autobiography in a pit near Tupperware's headquarters. Later that year, Tupper sold the company to Rexall for $16 million, divorced his wife, and moved to Costa Rica.

== Life after Tupperware ==
Wise founded her own party-plan cosmetics company, Cinderella International, the year after leaving Tupperware, but it was unsuccessful and closed down less than a year later. She was appointed as CEO of Viviane Woodard Cosmetics in 1960 but was still unable to replicate her success at Tupperware. She later worked as a consultant and in real estate.

In her later years, Wise was active in church and worked as a ceramist. She died on September 24, 1992, in Florida, where she lived and owned land near Lake Tohopekaliga, after a long illness.

== Legacy ==
Wise was to be portrayed by Sandra Bullock in a movie based on the book Tupperware Unsealed, written by Bob Kealing.

In 2016, the Tupperware company donated $200,000 to Florida's Osceola County to establish a conservation area and a "Brownie Wise Park" on an island in Lake Tohopekaliga.

== Bibliography ==
- Bax, Christina E. (Summer 2010). "Entrepreneur Brownie Wise: Selling Tupperware to America's Women in the 1950s". Journal of Women's History. 22 (2): 171–180. doi:10.1353/jowh.0.0159. S2CID 154411167.
- Kealing, Bob (2008). Tupperware, unsealed: Brownie Wise, Earl Tupper, and the home party pioneers. Gainesville: University Press of Florida. ISBN 9780813032276.
- Kealing, Bob (2016). Life of the party: the remarkable story of how Brownie Wise built, and lost, a Tupperware party empire. New York. ISBN 9781101903650. OCLC 929048536.
- Mason, Fergus (2014). Brownie Wise, Tupperware Queen: A Biography. CreateSpace Independent Publishing Platform. ISBN 9781629174099.
- Velazquez, Alyssa (Spring 2014). "Tupperware: An Open Container During a Decade of Containment" (PDF). Women's History Magazine (74): 19–26.
