= Joe Hara =

American businessman and philanthropist

Joseph (Joe) Hara
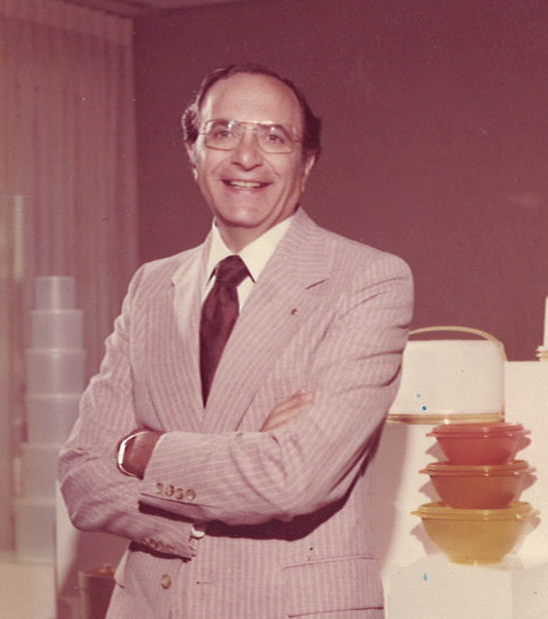
- Hara in front of Tupperware Display Circa 1970
- Born: Joseph Hara; December 29, 1925; Chicago, Illinois
- Died: December 24, 2017 (aged 91); Longwood, Florida
- Occupations: American businessman, President and CEO (Tupperware International)
- Employer: Par-T-Wise (Tupperware Distributor) 1953-63 Tupperware International (1963-86)
- Known for: Tupperware
- Spouse: Anita Greenberg Hara (m. 1947) (d. 2018)

Joseph Hara (December 29, 1925 – December 24, 2017) was an American businessman and philanthropist. Hara was best known for his time at Tupperware, where he served as a President and CEO of Tupperware Worldwide for 20 years from 1971 . Under his leadership, the company expanded to over 35 countries and 23 manufacturing plants.

== Biography ==
During World War II, Hara served in the South Pacific as a radio operator on airplanes. He started his career as a door-to-door stocking salesman. Shortly after, he and his brother Sam Hara opened Hara's Linen and Children's Wear in Chicago.

In 1951 Hara learned about a burgeoning product called Tupperware. He established his first distributorship, Par-T-Wise, with his cousin Jim Hara who ran a distributorship in Chicago. Par-T-Wise quickly grew to become the largest Tupperware distributorship in the U.S. with 35 managers and over 800 sales agents.

In 1963, Hara divided his Midwest distributorship into 8 different territories and sold them off to move to Orlando with his family to join the Tupperware management team as Vice President of Sales. In Orlando, Hara forged strong relationships with Tupperware President Hamer Wilson and chairman, Justin Dart. In 1966, Hara was named as the President of Tupperware U.S. for the next three years and in 1970, he was promoted to President of Tupperware International. Under Hara's leadership, Tupperware experienced unprecedented growth worldwide. Hara was featured on CBS's 60 Minutes in 1976 alongside Morley Safer.In 1985, Hara retired after 33 years as a top executive at Tupperware, and spent the next three decades serving on boards for several groups, including the Jewish Federation of Orlando, The Holocaust Memorial Resource and Education Center, Habitat for Humanity and the Brevard Music Festival.

Hara was an early champion of women in the workplace. In 2016 he wrote the following remembrance of his tenure leading Tupperware. "In the past 70 years of my life I have had the enormous pleasure of witnessing the untapped reservoir of female intelligence. The truth is that women dominate intellectually. I have observed this in my economic life having been exposed to thousands of women who, being made aware there are no restrictions, no limit to what they are free to achieve, do incredible things."

== Philanthropy ==
Hara and his wife were extremely active in Orlando and the Jewish Community. They were particularly proud of their involvement with JFS, an organization that provides food and counseling to people from all walks of life. They had also been longtime supporters of: The Jewish Federation of Orlando, the Holocaust Memorial Resource and Education Center, TOP Jewish Foundation, Foundation for Blindness, Habitat for Humanity, Orlando Museum of Art, United Way Human Resources, Friends of Santa Claus, The Jewish Academy, Congregation Ohev Shalom, Kinneret Council on Aging, the Brevard Music Festival, among others. They had both served on many of their boards throughout the years.

== Personal life and death ==
Hara and his wife Anita Greenberg were married in 1947 in Chicago and resided in Longwood, Florida. They had 3 children, 6 grandchildren and 9 great-grandchildren.

Hara died on December 24, 2017, surrounded by his family in his home in Longwood, Florida. His wife of more than 70 years, Anita, died four months later at the age of 92.
