= ThirdLove =

American lingerie company

- Industry: Apparel
- Founded: 2013
- Founders: Heidi Zak; David Spector
- Headquarters: San Francisco, U.S.
- Area served: Worldwide
- Products: Bras; Underwear; Loungewear; Nightwear
- Website: www.thirdlove.com

ThirdLove is an American lingerie company founded by Heidi Zak and her husband, David Spector, in 2013. The brand is known for marketing body positivity and offering size-inclusive bras and half-cup sizes. ThirdLove is also known for its online FitFinder quiz, which helps users determine their best fit bra and style.

== History ==
ThirdLove was inspired by Zak's own challenges with bra shopping, when she could not find bras that were both beautiful and comfortable. In 2013, Heidi left her Google advertising job to take a data-driven approach to designing bras.

After using Craigslist to invite 100 women to photograph themselves wearing fitted tank tops over their bras, ThirdLove used the images to design both their prototype bra with the help of proprietary lingerie designer Ra'el Cohen and an app that would determine bra size. Upon finding that standard cup sizes do not fit 37% of women, ThirdLove created half-cup sizes.

ThirdLove launched its first line in the spring of 2014. The company nearly collapsed when manufacturing in Mexico due to the high cost of importing fabrics. After losing $400,000 in investment capital, it transitioned to manufacturing in China. To generate more interest in the bras, the company streamlined its app and implemented its try-before-you-buy program in March 2015.

In 2017, Zak was named one of Fast Company's "100 Most Creative People".

In June 2018, the company added 24 larger sizes. In October, Forbes estimated ThirdLove to be worth $750 million and was placed on Forbes' Next Billion-Dollar Startup list.

In 2019, Zak and Spector received an EY Entrepreneur of the Year Award for the Northern California region.

In 2019, ThirdLove opened its first pop-up shop in Manhattan's Soho neighborhood from July 24 until March 2020.

In 2021, NPD Group named ThirdLove the "third largest online intimate apparel brand" in the US, behind Victoria's Secret and American Eagle's Aerie brands.

In 2021, ThirdLove launched its new Seamless wireless bra line.

As of 2022, ThirdLove has offered underwear, loungewear, sportswear and sleepwear and had doubled its 2021 Style Count.

=== Funding ===
ThirdLove raised $5.6 million in its seed round in 2013. Investors included NEA, Andreessen Horowitz, Yuri Milner, Silas Chou, Barry Sternlicht, Munjal Shah, Nasir Jones (NAS), and XG Ventures. The Series A investment was $8 million in 2016 and investors included New Enterprise Associates and Lori Greely (former CEO of ThirdLove's competitor, Victoria's Secret). In 2019, ThirdLove raised $55 Million in a Series B funding round led by L Catterton. Anne Wojcicki, Susan Wojcicki, and Tim Armstrong also participated in Series B.

== Victoria's Secret controversy ==
On October 23, 2018, ThirdLove's competitor Victoria's Secret officially filed two applications with the US Patent and Trademark Office for the name "Victoria's Secret First Love".

In a November 8, 2018 interview with Vogue, Ed Razek, former CMO of Victoria's Secret's parent company L Brands, expressed no desire to cast plus-size and “transsexual” models in the Victoria's Secret Fashion Show "because the show is a fantasy". Razek also claimed that the brand is "nobody’s third love" and that "Victoria's Secret has been women's first love from the beginning".

On November 18, 2018, Zak condemned Razek's comments and pushed for inclusivity in an open letter in the New York Times that went viral on Instagram.

The next day, Victoria's Secret posted Razek's apology for his comment about transgender models on Twitter and Razek resigned from his role as CMO in 2019.
