= Spanx =

American intimate apparel company

Spanx, Inc.
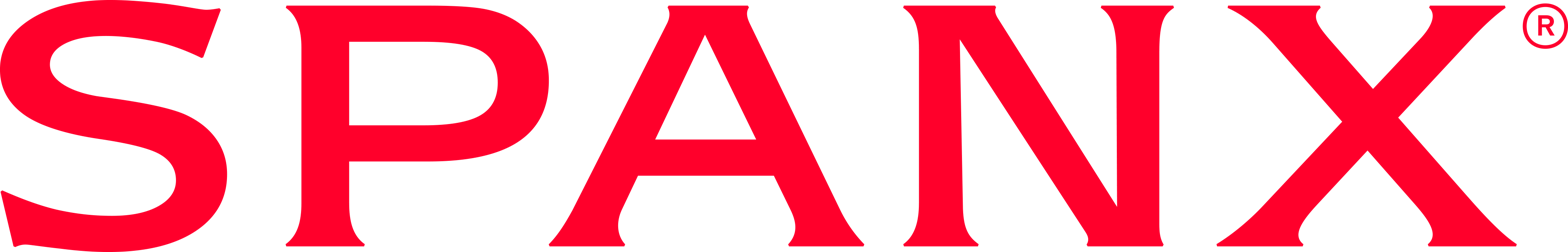
- Company type: Private
- Industry: Apparel, Intimates, Leisurewear
- Founded: Atlanta, Georgia, U.S. (February 15, 2000)
- Founder: Sara Blakely
- Headquarters: Atlanta, Georgia, U.S.
- Areas served: North America, Europe
- Key people: Caroline "Cricket" Whitton (CEO)
- Products: Shapewear, intimates, hosiery, apparel, activewear, loungewear, denim
- Revenue: ▲ est. $400 million (as of June 30, 2018)
- Number of employees: 250
- Parent: Blackstone Inc.
- Website: spanx.com

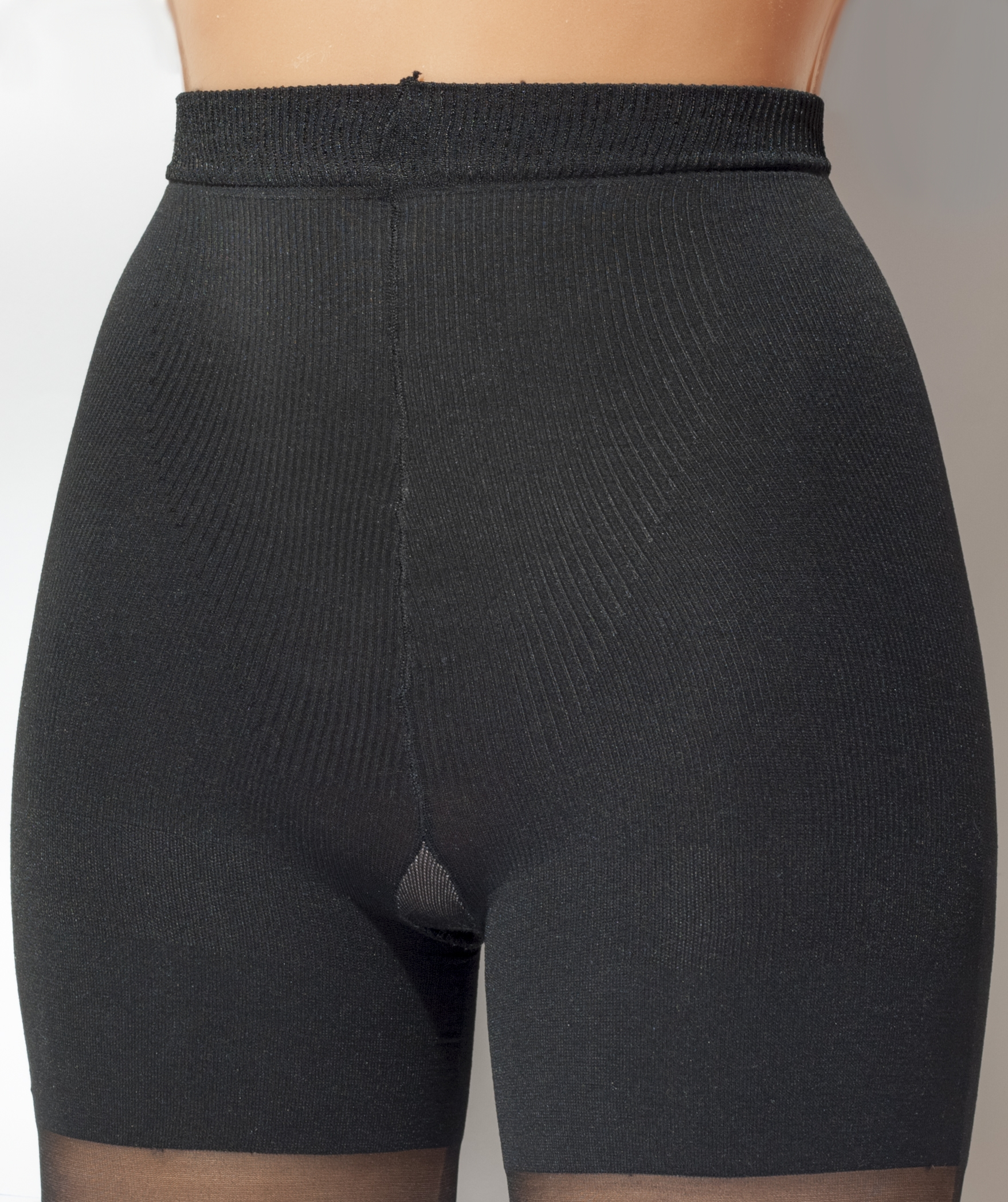
Spanx Shaping Pantyhose Super Control Sheers top front

Spanx, LLC is an American shapewear company founded in 2000 by Sara Blakely in Atlanta, Georgia. The company offers innerwear and outerwear, including activewear, apparel, denim, shapewear, swimwear, intimates, leggings, and hosiery. As of 2021, the company was valued at $1.2 billion and its products are sold in over 50 countries.

== History ==
=== Founding ===
Sara Blakely created Spanx in 2000 as a solution to the discomfort she experienced wearing pantyhose in hot weather, and disliking the seamed foot that stuck out of an open-toe shoe. After graduating from Florida State University (FSU) in 1993, Blakely first worked at Walt Disney World Resort, followed by Danka, an office supply company, where she sold fax machines door-to-door. She cut the feet off her control-top pantyhose to achieve a “smooth look” under white pants but did not like that the pantyhose rolled up her leg. Blakely moved to Atlanta, where she continued working for Danka from 9-5, set aside her $5,000 in savings, and spent two years creating her product. Blakely explained that she chose the name “Spanks” because of the “k” sound in the internationally recognized “Coca-Cola” and “Kodak.” She changed the spelling to “Spanx” at the last minute after reading that made-up names sold better. After several hosiery factories turned down her product, Blakely brought her idea to Neiman Marcus, where she convinced the buying rep by modeling her white pants with and without Spanx. She then brought the product to Bloomingdale’s, Saks Fifth Avenue and Bergdorf Goodman.

Once the Spanx brand was created, Blakely sent several of her products to The Oprah Winfrey Show. In November 2000, the brand was featured in Oprah's Favorite Things. In 2001, Blakely arranged with QVC to feature her product. In 2011, Spanx reported revenue of just under $250 million, and Forbes rated Blakely as the youngest self-made female billionaire. Spanx opened its first brick-and-mortar store in 2012. In 2013, Jessica Alba, Adele and Jennifer Garner wore Spanx to the Oscars. Gwyneth Paltrow also wears the brand.

In 2021, the asset manager firm Blackstone bought a majority stake in Spanx, valuing the company at $1.2 billion. An all-female investment team from Blackstone prepared the deal, and it was announced that the Board of Directors would be all-female, with Blakely serving as executive chairman. At the same time, Oprah Winfrey, Reese Witherspoon, and Whitney Wolfe Herd also invested in Spanx.

=== Launch ===
In 2000, Blakely launched the Spanx brand from her apartment, undertaking all initial calls and marketing herself. Her boyfriend at the time, a healthcare consultant, later resigned from his job and joined Blakely in the running of the nascent business.

Blakely previously conducted a meeting with a representative of the Neiman Marcus Group, at which she changed into the product in the ladies restroom in the presence of the Neiman Marcus buyer to prove the benefits of her innovation. Blakely's product was sold in seven Neiman Marcus stores as a result of the meeting; Bloomingdales, Saks, and Bergdorf Goodman soon followed.

=== 2000 Onwards ===
Following the establishment of the company, Blakely's then-boyfriend eventually became Spanx's chief operating officer (COO) and met Laurie Ann Goldman at the Saks Fifth Avenue in Atlanta in 2001, while she was on maternity leave from her employer at the time, Coca-Cola. Goldman was specifically looking for a Spanx product, and the pair exchanged contact details—Goldman became the CEO of Spanx in 2002.

Writing for Fortune magazine in February 2014, Colleen Leahey identified Goldman as a key aspect of the company's successful growth:

Goldman crafted a business model for the company based on lessons she learned during her 10-year stint at Coke: thinking big, starting small, and scaling fast. She advised her team at SPANX to focus on product quality over profit margins. “Every time somebody puts on a SPANX product, one of two things can happen: Our brand can get stronger, or our brand can get weaker. We gain leverage or we lose leverage.”

In the first half of 2014, Blakely worked on building the company's first standalone retail stores in shopping malls along the East Coast of the U.S., and also introduced denim to an expanding Spanx product line for the "Fall" range in March.

Goldman resigned from the company in February 2014, after over 10 years at the head of the Spanx. Gregg Ribatt, who had previously worked as an executive for Bennett Footwear, Stuart Weitzman Holdings and Collective Brands' Performance & Lifestyle Group, was appointed as interim chief executive officer. Ribatt's appointment generated discussions about a potential footwear expansion by Spanx according to a statement Blakely made in October 2013 explaining her ambition to design the world's most comfortable high-heel shoe prior to retirement.

In Blakely's June 2014 Forbes profile, the publication claims that the company generates "over $250 million in annual revenues and net profit margins estimated at 20%", while Blakely is very strongly committed to maintaining the private status of Spanx. However, speculation arose about a possible IPO following Goldman's resignation.

Spanx appointed Jan Singer, previously with Nike, as CEO in 2014.

It was announced on October 20, 2021, that Blakely had sold a majority stake in the business to Blackstone. The company was valued at $1.2 billion. The deal was prepared by an all-female investment team from Blackstone, and it was announced that the Board of Directors would be all-female, including Blakely as the Executive Chairwoman.

In 2025, Spanx and Blakely were included in Pirouette: Turning Points in Design, an exhibition at the Museum of Modern Art (MoMA) featuring "widely recognized design icons [...] highlighting pivotal moments in design history." The company's "OnCore" high-waisted mid-thigh short has been in the MoMA design collection since 2017.

== Products ==
Spanx has a range of sizes, from XS-3X. The company has expanded from shapewear, intimates and hosiery to apparel, activewear, loungewear, and denim. Their core collections include SPANXshape Booty Boost, SPANX Air Essentials, SPANXsculpt Seamless Power, SPANXsculpt OnCore, and SPANXshape EveryWear SPANXsmooth PerfectFit.

== Corporate affairs ==
=== Ownership ===
Spanx is a private company and has not released financial information. Forbes estimates its value at $540 million in 2021.

In 2002, Laurie Ann Goldman, formerly at Coca-Cola, was appointed CEO of Spanx. She stepped down in 2014 and was replaced by Jan Singer, Nike’s head of apparel. In 2024, Caroline (Cricket) Whitton was appointed as CEO and Jeanne Jackson as executive chair of the board.

To celebrate the company's $1.2 billion deal with Blackstone, employees received two first-class plane tickets and $10,000 each.

Blakely has also expanded beyond Spanx with the launch of her footwear company, Sneex.
