= List of Metrobus routes in Virginia =

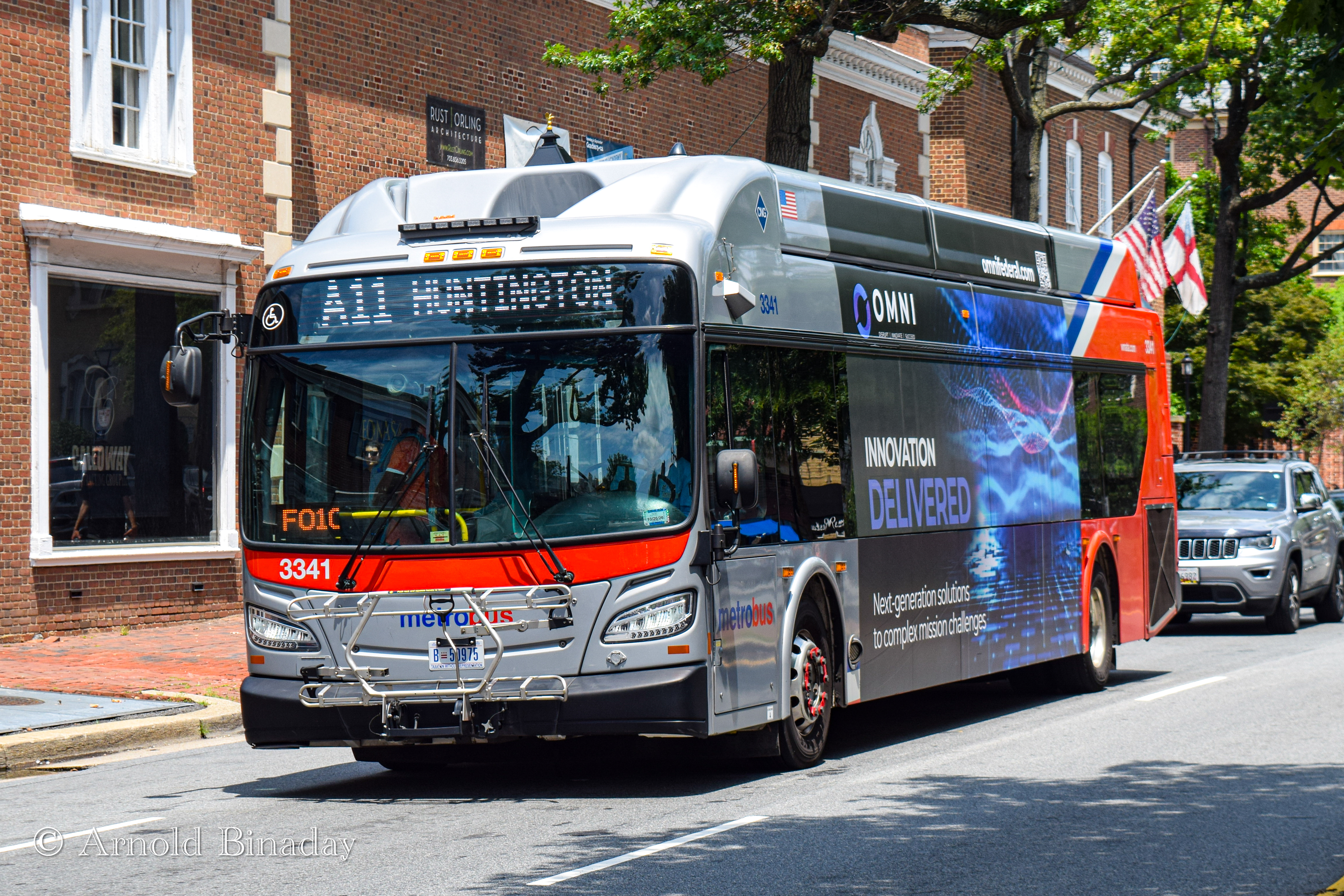
Route A11 in Alexandria

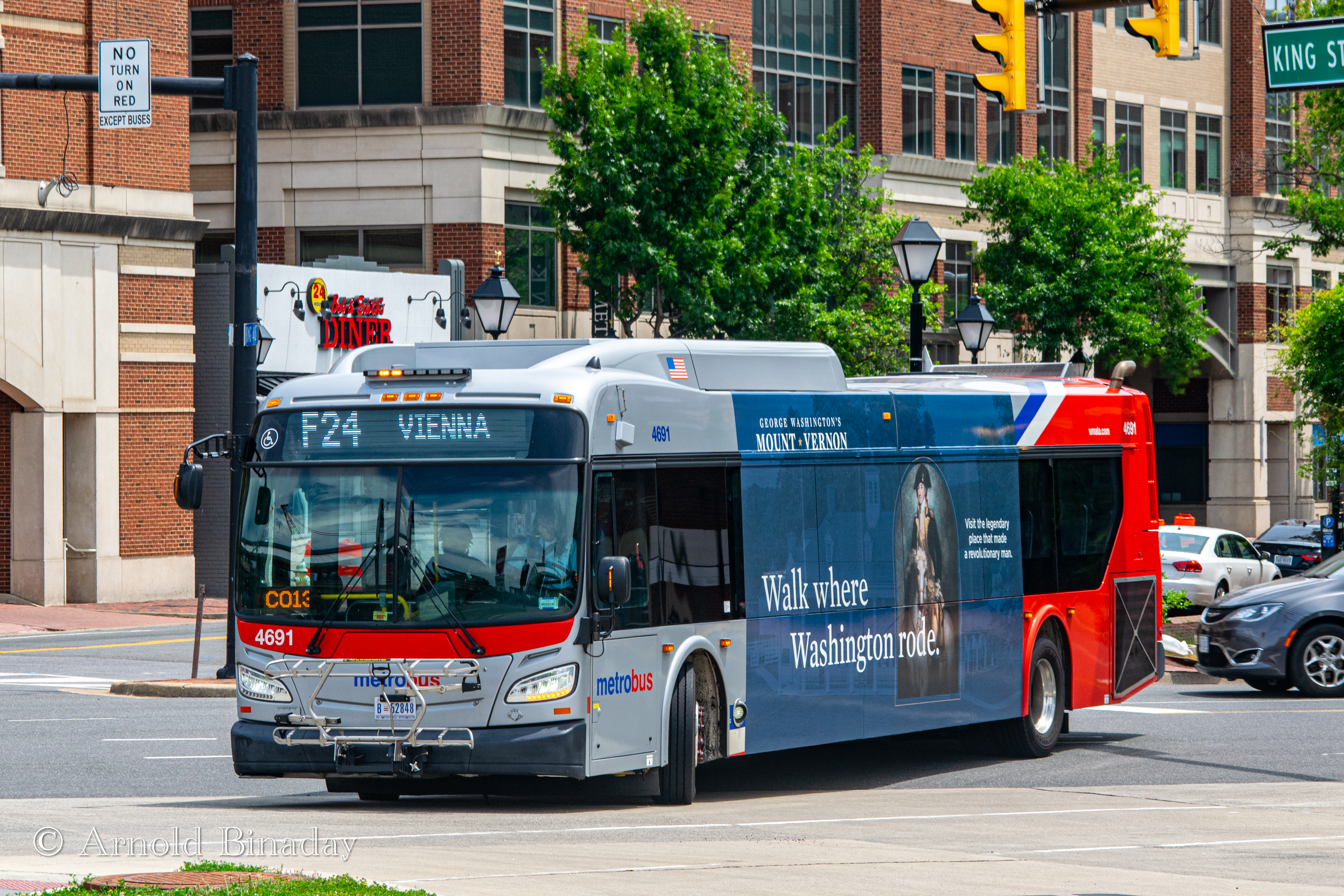
Route F24 at King Street station

This is a list of bus routes operated by the Washington Metropolitan Area Transit Authority (WMATA), branded as Metrobus in Northern Virginia. Most routes operated under Northern Virginia trolleys, the Alexandria, Barcroft, and Washington Transit Company (AB&W), and the Washington Virginia & Maryland Coach Company (WV&M) before the 1960s.

== Numbering ==
Most Metrobus routes in Northern Virginia were formerly with a single or double-digit number followed by a letter. They are now corresponded with an A (for Arlington County and Alexandria City routes) or F (for Fairfax County routes) route designation.

== History ==
Many current routes operate under former streetcar routes. The streetcars provided the main transportation in the Northern Virginia area from the 1800s to the 1940s. The Alexandria, Barcroft and Washington Transit Company (AB&W) and the Washington Virginia & Maryland Coach Company (WV&M) operated some of the routes prior to 1973. In 1973, WMATA acquired the two bus companies along with other bus companies to form its current Metrobus system. At one point, most VA routes would enter into Downtown before Metro was built in which all buses would terminate at stations in various locations. Today, the main Northern VA hub is at Pentagon station which connects to Arlington Transit, DASH, Fairfax Connector, Loudoun County Transit, PRTC OmniRide, and Ride Smart Northern Shenandoah Valley lines.

Due to the COVID-19 pandemic, service was mostly reduced to Sunday service schedules during the weekdays with select routes both added and suspended from March 18 until August 22, 2020. Routes 16C, 28A, 29K, 29N, and REX were the only routes that ran during the weekends with the rest of the routes suspended. On August 23, 2020, more routes came back during the weekdays and weekends returning Metrobus service to 75%. Most service and routes resumed on September 5, 2021 with WMATA introducing a brand new 12-to-20 Minute Frequent Network to select routes. Routes 16A/16C/16E/16G/16H, and 28A were added to the 12 Minute Frequent Network and Routes 1A, 7A, 23A/23B/23T, 29K/29N, Metroway, and REX were added to the 20 Minute Frequent Network. Route 16M was added to the 12 Minute Frequent Network, which eliminated Routes 16G and 16H beginning on June 25, 2023.

On November 21, 2024, WMATA approved its Better Bus Network Redesign plan, which began development in 2022. Under the plan, all routes would be renamed with easier-to-understand route designations, and would modify most of its existing routes to make the bus system easier to use, faster, and more reliable. The Better Bus Network was implemented on June 29, 2025, with all Virginia routes being renamed with an A (for Arlington County and Alexandria City routes) or F (for Fairfax County routes) route designation.

== Routes ==
Most Virginia Metrobus routes operate inside Northern Virginia. However, a few routes will go into Downtown DC under former streetcar routings and demand.

=== Alexandria City and Arlington County routes ===
Route	Terminals			Streets traveled	Service notes	Divisions
A11; Pentagon–Huntington	Huntington	↔	Pentagon	Mount Vernon Av; Washington St		Four Mile Run
A12; Ballston–Hunting Point	Hunting Point	↔	Ballston	Glebe Road; Mount Vernon Av; Washington St		Four Mile Run
A1X; Pentagon City–Potomac Yard	Pentagon City	↔	Braddock Road	Clark St; Crystal Dr; Richmond Hwy	Runs as bus rapid transit; Part of 20-minute frequent service network	Four Mile Run
A25; Brookville–S Fairlington	Pentagon	↔	West Alexandria Transit Center	Interstate 395	Weekday peak service only (AM to Pentagon, PM to West Alexandria)	Four Mile Run
A27; Landmark–N Fairlington	Pentagon	↔	Van Dorn Street	Interstate 395; Van Dorn St	Does not serve Pentagon City in the weekday peak direction (AM to Pentagon, PM to Southern Towers/Van Dorn)	Four Mile Run
A28; Landmark–Holmes Run Pkwy	Pentagon	↔	West Alexandria Transit Center	Interstate 395; Holmes Run Pkwy	Weekday peak service only (AM to Pentagon, PM to West Alexandria)	Four Mile Run
A29; Metro Center–Alexandria W	Metro Center	↔	Van Dorn Street	Interstate 395	Weekday peak service only (AM to Metro Center, PM to Van Dorn)	Four Mile Run
A40; Columbia Pike–National Landing	Skyline City (Seminary Rd & Magnolia Ln)	↔	Crystal City; L'Enfant Plaza (late nights)	Columbia Pike	Part of 12-minute frequent service network; Late night service is extended to L’Enfant Plaza	Four Mile Run
A49; Columbia Pike–Metro Center	Culmore (Glen Carlyn Dr & Vista Dr)	↔	Metro Center	Columbia Pike; Arlington Blvd; Roosevelt Bridge	Weekday peak service only	Four Mile Run
A58; Wilson Bl–Farragut Sq	Ballston (short turns); Seven Corners Transit Center	↔	Farragut Square	Clarendon/Wilson Blvds; Key Bridge; M St NW; Pennsylvania Av NW; I/K St NW	Part of 20-minute frequent service network; Trips alternate ending at Ballston or Seven Corners	Four Mile Run
A66; Culmore–Shirlington	Pentagon	↔	Culmore (Glen Carlyn Dr & Vista Dr)	Interstate 395; Leesburg Pike	Does not serve Pentagon City in the weekday peak direction (AM to Pentagon, PM to Culmore)	Four Mile Run
A70; Glebe Rd	Tysons Corner Center; Ballston (short turns)	↔	Potomac Yard	Old Dominion Dr; Glebe Rd	Part of 20-minute frequent service network; Trips alternate ending at Ballston or Tysons Corner Center	Four Mile Run
A71; Ballston–King St	Ballston	↔	King Street	George Mason Dr; S Four Mile Run Dr; King St		Four Mile Run
A76; Carlin Springs Rd	Ballston (short turns); Rosslyn	↔	Mark Center	Arlington Bl; Carlin Springs Rd	Short turns run to provide 15 minute service in the weekday peak direction (AM to Ballston, PM to Mark Center)	Four Mile Run
A90; Mark Center–Pentagon	Pentagon	↔	Mark Center	Interstate 395	Weekday service only	Four Mile Run

==== Route history ====
Route	History
A11	Existing routing of the former Route 10A.
A12	Existing routing of the former Route 10B.
A1X	Existing routing of the former Metroway.
A25	Combination of the former Route 8W and 22F with an extension to Landmark.
A27	Existing routing of the former Route 7A.
A28	Existing routing of the former Route 21C with an extension to West Alexandria Transit Center on the former Landmark Mall site.
A29	Created on December 14, 2025.
A40	Existing routing of the former Route 16M.; Late night service extends from Crystal City to L'Enfant Plaza via a modified routing of Route 16E.
A49	Combination of the former Route 16C and a modified routing of the former Route 16Y, with limited-stop service in Arlington eliminated.
A58	Combination of the former Routes 1A and 1B between Seven Corners and Ballston, and the former Route 38B route.
A66	Combination of the former Route 16C in Culmore, and former Route 22A between Pentagon and Shirlington.
A70	Existing routing of the former 23A, 23B, and 23T between Tysons Corner and South Kenmore Street, then a modified routing to Potomac Yard station.
A71	Existing routing of the former 22A between Ballston and Shirlington, then a reroute to King Street station via King Street.
A76	Existing routing of the former Route 25B with an extension to Rosslyn via North Arlington Boulevard and 10th Street.; Additional weekday peak period trips operate every 15 minutes (AM to Ballston, PM to Mark Center) as of June 21, 2026.
A90	Existing routing of the former Route 7M.

=== Fairfax County routes ===
Route	Terminals			Key streets traveled	Service notes	Divisions
F19; Mt Vernon Express	Mount Vernon (Mt Vernon Hwy & Grist Mill Woods Way)	↔	Potomac Park (19th St & Virginia Av NW) (AM) (18th & C Sts NW) (PM)	GW Parkway; Washington St; 14th St Bridge	Weekday peak service only (AM to Potomac Park, PM to Mount Vernon); Charges an express fare	Cinder Bed
F1X; Richmond Hwy	Fort Belvoir; Post Exchange & Commissary via Gunston Rd	↔	King Street	Richmond Hwy	Part of 20-minute frequent service network; Only authorized personnel are permitted to ride into Fort Belvoir; Select trips operate along Tully Gate	Cinder Bed
F20; Leesburg Pike	Tysons (south side)	↔	King Street	Leesburg Pike; Seminary Rd; Duke St	Part of 12-minute frequent service network	Cinder Bed
F23; Little River Tpk–George Mason	George Mason University (University Dr & George Mason Bl)	↔	King Street	University Dr; Main St; Little River Tpk; Duke St	Part of 20-minute frequent service network alongside Route F24	Cinder Bed
F24; Little River Tpk–Vienna	Vienna	↔	King Street	Nutley St; Pickett Rd; Little River Tpk; Duke St	Part of 20-minute frequent service network alongside Route F23	Cinder Bed
F26; East Falls Church–Annandale	East Falls Church	↔	NVCC–Annandale	Columbia Pike; Little River Tpk		Cinder Bed
F28; Kings Park West Express	Pentagon	↔	Kings Park West (Twinbrook Dr & Twinbrook Run Dr)	Braddock Rd; Capital Beltway; Shirley Hwy	Weekday peak service only (AM to Pentagon, PM to Kings Park West); Charges an express fare	Four Mile Run
F29; Braddock Rd	Pentagon	↔	George Mason University (University Dr & George Mason Bl)	Braddock Rd; Capital Beltway; Shirley Hwy	Weekday peak service only (AM to Pentagon, PM to GMU)	Cinder Bed
F44; Columbia Pike–Pentagon	Pentagon	↔	Annandale (Patriot Dr & Americana Dr)	Columbia Pike		Four Mile Run
F50; Washington Bl	Ballston	↔	George Mason University (University Dr & George Mason Bl); Vienna (short turns)	Langston Bl; Washington St; Washington Bl; Blenheim Bl	Weekday evening and weekend service operates between Ballston and Vienna only	Cinder Bed
F60; Arlington Bl–Fair Oaks	Ballston	↔	Fair Oaks Mall; Monument Drive Transit Center (short turns)	Wilson Bl; Arlington Bl; Fairfax Bl	Part of 20-minute frequent service network alongside Route F61; Early morning and evening service operates between Ballston and Monument Drive Transit Center only	Four Mile Run
F61; Arlington Bl–Jermantown Rd	Ballston	↔	Fair Oaks Mall; Monument Drive Transit Center (short turns); Vienna (late nights)	Wilson Bl; Arlington Bl; Jermantown Rd; Random Hills Rd	Part of 20-minute frequent service network alongside Route F60; Early morning and evening service operates between Ballston and Monument Drive Transit Center only; Late night service operates between Ballston and Vienna only	Four Mile Run
F62; Pershing Dr–Arlington Bl	Rosslyn	↔	Dunn Loring; Seven Corners Transit Center (short turns)	Arlington Bl; Pershing Dr	Weekend trips alternate to Dunn Loring and Seven Corners	Four Mile Run
F81; Burke Centre Express	Burke Centre (Oak Leather Dr & Oakenshaw Ct)	↔	Pentagon	Old Keene Mill Rd; Shirley Hwy	Weekday peak service only (AM to Pentagon, PM to Burke Centre); Charges an express fare	Cinder Bed; Four Mile Run
F83; Cardinal Forest Express	Orange Hunt (Huntsman Bl & Fairfax County Pkwy)	↔	Pentagon	Old Keene Mill Rd; Shirley Hwy	Weekday peak service only (AM to Pentagon, PM to Orange Hunt); Charges an express fare	Cinder Bed
F85; Little River Tpk–Pentagon	Annandale (Americana Dr & Heritage Dr)	↔	Pentagon	Little River Tpk; Shirley Hwy	Weekday peak service only (AM to Pentagon, PM to Annandale)	Four Mile Run

==== Route history ====
Route	History
F19	Existing routing of the former Route 11Y.
F1X	Existing routing of the former Richmond Highway Express.
F20	Existing routing of the former Route 28A.
F23	Existing routing of the former Routes 29K.
F24	Existing routing of the former Routes 29N.
F26	Existing routing of the former Route 26A with new weekend service.
F28	Existing routing of the former Route 17K.
F29	Combination routing of the former Routes 17B, 17G, and 17M, with fares reassigned from express to local.
F44	Existing routing of the former Route 16A with limited-stop service in Arlington being eliminated.
F50	Combination routing of the former Route 2A between Ballston and Dunn Loring, and Route 2B from Dunn Loring and Vienna with an extension to George Mason University.
F60	Combination routing of the former Routes 1A, 1B, and 1C with service to Vienna station being replaced by Route F61.
F61	Combination routing of the former Routes 1A and 1B between Ballston and Vienna stations and Route 2B between Vienna station and Fair Oaks Mall.; Route 1B and 2B service to Dunn Loring station was eliminated and combined with Route 4B to form Route F62.
F62	Combination routing of the former 1B between Dunn Loring and Seven Corners, and existing Route 4B routing.
F81	Existing routing of the former Routes 18J and 18P with reverse-peak service being eliminated.
F83	Existing routing of the former Route 18G.
F85	Existing routing of the former Route 29G.

== Former routes ==
=== Routes eliminated due to Bus Redesign ===
All routes listed below were eliminated or renamed into an A or F designation on June 29, 2025.

Route	Terminals			Streets traveled	Service notes
1A, 1B; Wilson Boulevard–Vienna Line	1A Vienna station; 1B Dunn Loring station	↔	Ballston–MU station	Arlington Boulevard; Wilson Boulevard	Modified and renamed into the F60 and F61.
1C; Fair Oaks–Fairfax Boulevard Line	Fair Oaks Mall	↔	Dunn Loring station	Arlington Boulevard; Fairfax Boulevard	Combined with the 1A and renamed into the F60.
2A; Washington Blvd.–Dunn Loring Line	Dunn Loring station	↔	Ballston–MU station	Lee Highway; Washington Street; Washington Boulevard	Combined with the 2B and renamed into the F50.
2B; Fair Oaks–Jermantown Road Line	Fair Oaks Mall	↔	Dunn Loring station	Jermantown Road; Lee Highway	Combined with the 2A and renamed into the F50.
3F, 3Y; Langston Boulevard-McPherson Square Line	East Falls Church station	↔	3F Farragut Square; 3Y McPherson Square station	Constitution Avenue (3F); Lee Highway (3Y); Roosevelt Bridge; K Street NW (3Y)	Discontinued with no replacement service.
4B; Pershing Drive–Arlington Boulevard Line	Seven Corners Transit Center	↔	Rosslyn station	Arlington Boulevard; Pershing Drive	Combined with the 1B and renamed into the F62.
7A; Landmark–North Fairlington Line	Pentagon station	↔	Van Dorn Street station	Interstate 395; Van Dorn Street	Renamed into the A27.
7M; Mark Center–Pentagon Line	Mark Center	↔	Pentagon station	Interstate 395	Renamed into the A90.
8W; Foxchase–Seminary Valley Line	Mark Center	↔	Pentagon station	Interstate 395	Combined with the 22F and extended to Landmark and renamed into the A25.
10A; Alexandria–Pentagon Line	Huntington station	↔	Pentagon station	Mount Vernon Avenue	Renamed into the A11.
10B; Hunting Point–Ballston Line	Hunting Point	↔	Ballston–MU station	Mount Vernon Avenue; Glebe Road	Renamed into the A12.
11Y; Mount Vernon Express Line	Mount Vernon (Mt Vernon Highway & Grist Mill Woods Rd)	↔	West Potomac Park (18th & C Sts, NW)	George Washington Memorial Parkway; 14th Street Bridge	Renamed into the F19.
16A, 16C, 16E; Columbia Pike Line	16A Annandale (Patriot & Americana Drives); 16C, 16E Culmore (Glen Carlyn & Vista Drives)	↔	16A, 16C Pentagon station; 16E Franklin Square (I & 13th Streets NW)	Columbia Pike	16A was renamed into the F44; 16C, 16E were discontinued and replaced by Routes A40, A49, and A66.
16M; Columbia Pike–National Landing Line	Skyline City (Seminary Rd & Magnolia La)	↔	Crystal City station	Columbia Pike	Renamed into the A40 and combined with the 16E.
16Y; Columbia Pike–Farragut Square Line	Barcroft (Four Mile Run Dr & Columbia Pike)	↔	McPherson Square station	Columbia Pike; Arlington Boulevard; Roosevelt Bridge	Combined with the 16C and renamed into the A49.
17B, 17M; Kings Park–North Springfield Line	17B Burke Centre-VRE Park & Ride; 17M North Springfield (Leesville Blvd & Appotamox Court)	↔	Pentagon station	Braddock Road; Shirley Highway	Combined with the 17G and renamed into the F29.
17G, 17K; Kings Park Express Line	17G George Mason University; 17K Kings Park West (Twinbrook Dr & Twinbrook Run Dr)	↔	Pentagon station	Braddock Road; Capital Beltway; Shirley Highway	17G Combined with the 17B and 17M and renamed into the F29.; 17K was renamed into the F28.
18G, 18J; Orange Hunt Line	18J Rolling Valley Mall; 18G Orange Hunt (Huntsman Blvd & Fairfax County Pkwy	↔	Pentagon station	Old Keene Mill Road; Shirley Highway	18G was renamed into the F83.; 18J combined with the 18P and renamed into the F81.
18P; Burke Centre Express Line	Burke Centre (Oak Leather Dr & Oakenshaw Court)	↔	Pentagon station	Old Keene Mill Road; Shirley Highway	Renamed into the F81.
21C; Landmark–Holmes Run Parkway Line	Landmark (Stevens Avenue & South Walker Street)	↔	Pentagon station	Interstate 395	Extended to Landmark Mall and renamed into the A28.
22A, 22F; Barcroft–South Fairlington Line	22A Ballston–MU station; 22F Skyline City (Skyline House Apartments)	↔	Pentagon station	George Mason Drive (22A); Interstate 395 (22A, 22F)	22A rerouted to King Street – Old Town station and renamed into the A71.; 22F combined with the 8W and extended to Landmark and renamed into the A25.
23A, 23B, 23T; McLean–Crystal City Line	23A, 23T Tysons Corner Center; 23B Ballston–MU station	↔	23A, 23B Crystal City station; 23T Shirlington Transit Center	Old Dominion Drive; Glebe Road	Combined and rerouted to serve Potomac Yard station and renamed into the A70.
25B; Carlin Springs Road Line	Ballston–MU station	↔	Mark Center; Southern Towers	Carlin Springs Road	Extended to Rosslyn station and renamed into the A76.
26A; Annandale–East Falls Church Line	East Falls Church station	↔	NVCC–Annandale	Columbia Pike; Little River Turnpike	Renamed into the F26.
28A; Leesburg Pike Line	Tysons station (south side)	↔	King Street – Old Town station	Leesburg Pike	Renamed into the F20.
28F; Skyline City Line	Skyline City (5113 S George Mason Drive)	↔	Pentagon station	Interstate 395	Discontinued with no replacement service.
29G; Annandale Line	Annandale (Americana & Heritage Drives)	↔	Pentagon station	Little River Turnpike; Capital Beltway; Shirley Highway	Renamed into the F85.
29K, 29N; Alexandria–Fairfax Line	29K George Mason University; 29N Vienna station	↔	King Street – Old Town station	Little River Turnpike	Renamed into the F23 (29K) and F24 (29N).
38B; Ballston–Farragut Square Line	Ballston–MU station	↔	Farragut Square	Clarendon Boulevard; Wilson Boulevard; Key Bridge; M Street NW; Pennsylvania Avenue NW; K Street NW (to Farragut Square); I Street NW (to Ballston)	Extended to Seven Corners and renamed into the A58.
MWY; Metroway	Pentagon City station	↔	Braddock Road station	Clark Street; Crystal Drive; Richmond Highway	Renamed into the A1X.
REX; Richmond Highway Express	Fort Belvoir; Post Exchange & Commissary via Gunston Road.	↔	King Street – Old Town station	Richmond Highway	Renamed into the F1X.

==== Former Routes history ====
Route	History
1A, 1B	Formerly known as the Wilson Boulevard-Fairfax Line.; 1C was split from the line and renamed the Dunn Loring-Fair Oaks Line; the eastern half became the 1A route.; Route 1D was eliminated on June 24, 2007.; Route 1F was eliminated on December 29, 2013.; Route 1Z was eliminated on June 26, 2016.; Route 1E was eliminated on August 21, 2016, and replaced by ART route 54.; Replaced by Routes F60, F61, and F62 on June 29, 2025.
1C	Originally part of the Wilson Boulevard Line until June 24, 2007; Eastern half was replaced by the 1A.; 1C was extended to McConnell Public Safety and Transportation Operations Center from December 29, 2013, to March 14, 2021.; Replaced by Routes F60 and F61 on June 29, 2025.
2A	2A used to serve Tysons Corner Shopping Center until replaced by 2T north of Dunn Loring station in the late 1990s.; 2A replaced the 2B, 2C & 2G between Ballston and Dunn Loring stations and became a single route with daily service on December 29, 2013.; Replaced by Route F50 on June 29, 2025.
2B	2B & 2G between Dunn Loring station and Fair Oaks Mall became a single route (2B) with Monday-Saturday service and was extended to McConnell Public Safety and Transportation Operations Center on December 29, 2013.; Also on that same day, route 2B was truncated to Dunn Loring station (the former 2B routing between Ballston and Dunn Loring stations is now serviced by route 2A).; New Sunday service was added to route 2B beginning on June 26, 2016.; Service to McConnell Public Safety and Transportation Operations Center was discontinued on March 14, 2021.; Replaced by Routes F50, F60, and F61 on June 29, 2025.
3F, 3Y	Introduced on September 26, 2004.; As of December 13, 2015, route 3Y was extended to operate between East Falls Church and McPherson Square stations. Service along North George Mason Drive, Patrick Henry Drive and North Harrison Street was discontinued and is now provided by ART 51.; Route 3Y was truncated to Virginia Hospital Center on September 5, 2021 after being reinstated from suspension. Service to East Falls Church station was temporarily discontinued.; A new Route 3F was introduced on December 26, 2021, operating between Farragut Square and East Falls Church station via I-66. The same day, Route 3Y was re-extended back to East Falls Church station.; Route 3Y was rerouted along Arlington Memorial Bridge on May 29, 2022.; Discontinued on June 29, 2025.
4B	4A replaced the 4H & 4B replaced the 4E on December 29, 2013.; 4A service between Culmore and Seven Corners was replaced by route 26A on December 29, 2013.; Saturday route 4A service was eliminated on June 26, 2016.; 4A midday service was eliminated on June 24, 2018.; Route 4A was suspended as of March 18, 2020; later discontinued by September 5, 2021.; Replaced by Route F62 on June 29, 2025.
7A	7Y was introduced in December 2010 to replace the former 13A and 13B routes, which was basically an extension of the 7E.; 7E was replaced by the 7Y on June 30, 2013.; All route 7F service along North Morgan and North Chambliss streets was eliminated on August 23, 2020.; 7Y was extended to Washington Convention Center on August 24, 2014, but was shortened to Farragut Square on March 27, 2016.; All Route 7F and 7Y service were eliminated on September 5, 2021.; Route 7A was rerouted along the 25B routing between Southern Towers and Van Dorn Street station. Service to Lincolnia was replaced by DASH Route 35.; Replaced by Route A27 on June 29, 2025.
7M	Originally a part of the Lincolnia-North Fairlington Line until June 26, 1983, being replaced by the 7D, 7E, 7W, 7X, 8W, & 8X.; "Reincarnated" back into service on August 8, 2011, in anticipation of the relocation of military personnel associated with the BRAC realignment.; Replaced by Route A90 on June 29, 2025.
8W	8W was extended to Mark Center from Foxchase in 2011.; 8X was replaced by the 8W on June 30, 2013.; From May 25, 2019, to September 8, 2019, temporary Weekday Midday Service was added to the 8S and 8Z due to the Blue/Yellow Line summer shutdown.; 8S and 8Z wereed as of March 16, 2020; later discontinued by September 5, 2021.; 8Z was replaced by the 21C on June 6, 2021.; Replaced by Route A25 on June 29, 2025.
10A	10E originally terminated in Del Ray until extended to Braddock Road station in 2008.; 10R & 10S were introduced on March 30, 2014 & 10S replaced the 9E.; 10A was rerouted to Huntington station on June 26, 2016, replacing portions of the discontinued route 9A.; 10R & 10S were discontinued on June 26, 2016.; 10N was introduced on June 25, 2017, replacing the 13Y.; 10E segment between Rosslyn and the Pentagon was eliminated on June 24, 2018.; Route 10E has been suspended as of March 16, 2020, while Route 10N has been suspended as of August 21, 2020; both later discontinued by September 5, 2021.; Replaced by Route A11 on June 29, 2025.
10B	Formerly known as the Alexandria-Arlington-Pentagon Line, along with 10A, the former 10C (which later became the Alexandria-Arlington Line) & 10E.; Replaced by Route A12 on June 29, 2025.
11Y	11Y terminated at Farragut Square until it was extended to Potomac Park in 2009.; From May 25, 2019, to September 8, 2019, new temporary Weekday Midday service was added to the 11Y due to the Blue/Yellow Line shutdown and operated between Potomac Park and Hunting Point only.; Service was suspended beginning on March 16, 2020, due to the COVID-19 pandemic. Part of the route was reincarnated as route 11C on June 6, 2021, which was cutback to Braddock Road station. Rotue 11Y was fully reincarnated on June 25, 2023, re-extending back into Washington DC.; Replaced by Route F19 on June 29, 2025.
16A, 16C, 16E	16D was replaced by the 16A & 16L on March 29, 2015.; Daily service was added to 16A on June 24, 2018.; 16B, 16J, & 16P was replaced by the 16A, 16C, 16E & 16H on June 24, 2018.; 16C replaced the 16X on June 24, 2018.; 16A & 16C serve limited stops on Columbia Pike in Arlington County, service to all stops on Columbia Pike in Arlington County are provided by routes 16E & 16M.; 16C to Federal Triangle was suspended on March 16, 2020; later discontinued by September 5, 2021.; 16A was replaced by Route F44 while Routes 16C and 16E were replaced by Routes A40 and A66 on June 29, 2025.
16M	All Route 16G and 16H service were merged into a new Route 16M on June 25, 2023.; Replaced by Route A40 on June 29, 2025.
16Y	Introduced on September 29, 2002; Service now operates in both directions during the weekday peak hours as of September 5, 2021.; Route was rerouted along Arlington Memorial Bridge on May 29, 2022.; Replaced by Route A49 on June 29, 2025.
17B, 17M	Beginning June 25, 2017, Route 17B trips will be changed to operate between Burke Centre VRE Park & Ride and Pentagon Metrorail Station. Route 17B service to Kings Park West (Zion Drive, Sideburn Road & Commonwealth Blvd) will be eliminated.; The Kings Park Line will be renamed Kings Park-North Springfield Line.; Routes 17A and 17F were eliminated on June 25, 2017.; Replaced by Routes F28 and F29 on June 29, 2025.
17G, 17K	Route 17L was suspended on March 16, 2020; later discontinued by September 5, 2021.; All Route 17H and 17K service were merged into a new Route 17K on June 6, 2021.; Replaced by Routes F28 and F29 on June 29, 2025.
18G, 18J	Route 18G and 18H were combined into a new 18G on September 5, 2021.; 18G was replaced by Route F83 while Route 18J was discontinued on June 29, 2025.
18P	18P was known as the Orange Hunt-Burke Centre Line (along with the 18R) until the early 2000s.; Replaced by Route F81 on June 29, 2025.
21C	Introduced on June 6, 2021, as a combination of the 8Z and 21A which were suspended.; Replaced by Route A28 on June 29, 2025.
22A, 22F	22A, 22C, & 22F was part of the Walker Chapel-Pentagon Line until 2003; 22A, 22B, 22C, 22F replaced the 25A, 25C, 25D, & 25E on June 21, 2015.; 22A: Sunday service began on June 21, 2015.; 22B was replaced by 22A & 22C on June 24, 2018.; Route 22C was suspended on March 16, 2020; later discontinued by September 5, 2021.; Route 22F was extended to Skyline City replacing the 28G on June 6, 2021.; 22A was replaced by Route A71 while Route 22F was replaced by Route A66 on June 29, 2025.
23A, 23B, 23T	23A was truncated from Tysons-Westpark Transit Station to Tysons Corner Center March 30, 2014.; 23B & 23T were introduced March 30, 2014, replacing the 23C.; 23B & 23T service added weekday middays, evenings & weekends beginning June 26, 2016, replacing most of the route 23A service. 23A now operates only during the early mornings and late nights.; Replaced by Route A70 on June 29, 2025.
25B	25B was once a part of the Ballston-Bradlee-Pentagon Line until 2007.; Sunday service, which operates between Southern Towers and Ballston station, began on June 21, 2015.; All service was shorten to Southern Towers on September 5, 2021, with weekday and Saturday trips ending/beginning at Mark Center.; Service between Southern Towers and Van Dorn Street Station was replaced by the 7A. The line was also renamed to the Carlin Springs Road Line.; Replaced by Route A76 on June 29, 2025.
26A	26A was an East Falls Church Line that operated until 2009, "reincarnated" as the Annandale-East Falls Church Line on December 29, 2013.; Replaced by Route F26 on June 29, 2025.
28A	First known as the Leesburg Pike Line, was known as the Alexandria-Tysons Corner Line until 2009.; Upon changes in late 2009, 28B was discontinued and the 28A portion between Inova Alexandria Hospital and King Street Station became a limited-stop portion, the local stops have been replaced by DASH routes AT5 and AT6.; Beginning June 25, 2017, Route 28A westbound trips to Tysons Corner (now Tysons) station will not operate via Tysons Corner Center (Towers Crescent Dr, Tysons One Place and Fashion Blvd). Eastbound trips to King Street-Old Town station will continue to operate via Tysons Corner Center.; Service was rerouted between Seven Corners and Broad & Washington Streets to serve East Falls Church station, and was also rerouted between Inova Alexandria Hospital and Foxchase to Duke Street. Service along King Street and West Braddock Road was eliminated and replaced by DASH Routes 31 and 36.; Replaced by Route F20 on June 29, 2025.
28F	Replaced by Route A27 on June 29, 2025.
29G	29E was replaced by the 29G & 29W March 29, 2015.; 29H was replaced by 16L on March 29, 2015.; 29X was renamed 29W on March 29, 2015.; Replaced by Route F85 on June 29, 2025.
29K, 29N	Operates limited-stop service along Duke Street between King St-Old Town Station & Landmark Mall, local stops provided by DASH 30.; 29N was extended from Fairfax Circle to Vienna Station.; 29K, 29N discontinued service between Royal & Pendleton Streets and King Street Station December 29, 2013.; 29N operates on Sundays as of August 24, 2014.; 29K operates weekend service as of June 26, 2016.; Replaced by Routes F23 (29K) and F24 (29N) on June 29, 2025.
38B	Replaced the 38A and 38C around the 1990s; Replaced the 38F in 1981.; Service to Union station was discontinued in the 1980s.; Replaced by Route A58 on June 29, 2025.
Metroway	Metroway was introduced on August 24, 2014, and replaced Route 9S.; Metroway service was extended to Pentagon City and replaced the Pentagon City-Crystal City portion of the 16H on April 17, 2016.; Replaced by Route A1X on June 29, 2025.
REX	REX service started on September 26, 2004, covering the section of the 9A route that served Fort Belvoir.; Beginning June 25, 2017, weekday service will extend to the Fort Belvoir Post Exchange/Commissary via Gunston Road. Service to Jackson Loop will be discontinued. Nearby stops will be served along Gunston Road at 5th Street.; Weekend service was extended to the Fort Belvoir Post Exchange/Commissary on June 25, 2023.; Replaced by Route F1X on June 29, 2025.

=== Routes eliminated before Bus Redesign ===
During the years, Fairfax Connector, DASH, Arlington Transit, and PRTC OmniRide took over parts of Northern Virginia for WMATA as it would be easier to operate and maintain. Some of the discontinued routes from WMATA are now operated under those bus carriers. Other routes were discontinued due to either low ridership, duplication of another route, merged into other routes, or low funding. However some routes would be reincarnated into new routes for Metrobus. Examples of reincarnations were the 7M, 16C, and 26A.

Route	Terminals			Streets traveled	History
1D; Wilson Boulevard-Fairfax Line	Dunn Loring station	↔	Ballston–MU station	Wilson Boulevard	Discontinued on June 24, 2007.
1E; Wilson Boulevard–Vienna Line	Seven Corners Transit Center	↔	Ballston–MU station	Wilson Boulevard	Discontinued on August 21, 2016, replaced by ART route 54.
1F; Wilson Boulevard Line	Seven Corners Transit Center	↔	Ballston–MU station	Wilson Boulevard	Discontinued on December 29, 2013, replaced by 1A.
1H		↔			
1M, 1V, 1W; Wilson Boulevard-Annandale Line	Annandale	↔		Wilson Boulevard	
1X; Wilson Boulevard-Fairfax Line	Annandale	↔		Wilson Boulevard	
1Z; Wilson Boulevard–Vienna Line	Vienna station	↔	Ballston–MU station	Wilson Boulevard; Arlington Boulevard	Discontinued on June 26, 2016, replaced by 1A.
2C, 2G; Washington Boulevard Line	Ballston–MU station	↔	2C Tysons Corner; 2G Fair Oaks Mall	Washington Boulevard	Discontinued on December 29, 2013, replaced by 2A, 2B & Fairfax Connector routes 401 & 402.
2M; Washington Boulevard Line	Ballston–MU station	↔		Washington Boulevard	
2T; Tysons Corner–Dunn Loring Line	Tysons station	↔	Dunn Loring station	Chain Bridge Road	Discontinued on June 25, 2017.
2V		↔			
2W; Vienna-Oakton Line	Oakton	↔	Vienna station	Chain Bridge Road	Discontinued on June 28, 2009. Replaced by Fairfax Connector 466.
2X		↔			
3A; Annandale Road Line	Annandale (Patriot & Americana Drives)	↔	Seven Corners Transit Center	Annandale Road	3B service between East Falls Church and West Falls Church was replaced by an extended route 3T December 29, 2013.; As of December 13, 2015, route 3A no longer serves Rosslyn station and was shortened to operate between Annandale and East Falls Church station only.; The former 3A routing along Lee Highway between East Falls Church and Rosslyn stations is now serviced by ART Route 55.; Transferred to Fairfax Connector and renamed to Route 803 on July 10, 2021.
3B, 3E; Lee Highway Line	3B West Falls Church station; 3E East Falls Church station	↔	Rosslyn station	Lee Highway; W. Broad Street (3B)	Discontinued on December 29, 2013, and replaced by 3A.
3F; Lee Highway Line	Tysons Corner Center	↔	Rosslyn station		Discontinued on June 30, 2002, replaced by 3T.; 3F was reincarnated as the Lee Highway–Farragut Square Line on December 26, 2021.
3R		↔			
3T		↔			Reincarnated as the "Pimmit Hills Line" in 2002.
3T; Pimmit Hills Line	McLean station	↔	West Falls Church station (Off-peak periods); East Falls Church station (Peak periods)	Leesburg Pike	3T was created to replace the portion of the 3B, 3F, 3Z and 14W west of West Falls Church station on June 30, 2002.; 3T was extended to McLean station & to East Falls Church station December 29, 2013, replacing the 3B and 3E.; Service was rerouted to McLean station on July 26, 2014.; 3T was truncated from East Falls Church station to West Falls Church station on June 26, 2016 but was extended back to East Falls Church station during rush hour on December 30, 2018, which is funded by the I-66 Commuter Choice Program.; Transferred to Fairfax Connector and renamed to Route 703 on July 10, 2021.
3W, 3Z; Westpark-West Falls Church Line	West Falls Church station	↔	Tysons-Westpark Transit Center		Discontinued on June 30, 2002. Replaced by 2T, 3T and 28T.
4A; Pershing Drive–Arlington Boulevard Line	Seven Corners Transit Center	↔	Rosslyn station	Arlington Boulevard	4A replaced the 4H on December 29, 2013.; 4A service between Culmore and Seven Corners was replaced by route 26A on December 29, 2013.; Saturday route 4A service was eliminated on June 26, 2016.; 4A midday service was eliminated on June 24, 2018.; Suspended on March 18, 2020; later discontinued by September 5, 2021.
4C; Culmore-Ballston Line		↔			
4E, 4H; Pershing Drive–Arlington Boulevard Line	Rosslyn station	↔	4E Arlington Forest; 4H Seven Corner Transit Center	Pershing Drive; Arlington Boulevard	Discontinued on December 29, 2013, and replaced by 4A and 4B.
4G		↔			
4S; Pershing Drive–Arlington Boulevard Line	Annandale	↔	Rosslyn station	Sleepy Hollow Road; Arlington Boulevard	Cut back to Seven Corners on September 24, 2006, and renamed as Route 4H.
5A, 5B, 5C; North Reston Express Line	Reston	↔		Interstate 66	
5A; D.C.–Dulles Line	Washington Dulles International Airport	↔	L'Enfant Plaza station (D & 7th Streets SW)	Dulles Toll Road; Interstate 66; 14th Street Bridge	Discontinued on November 16, 2022, and replaced by the Silver Line Phase 2 extension.
5B; D.C.-Tysons Corner Line	Tysons Corner Center	↔	L'Enfant Plaza station (D & 7th Streets SW)	Dulles Toll Road; Interstate 66; 14th Street Bridge	Discontinued on September 24, 2006.; An earlier different line also numbered 5B was called Reston North Line.
5D; North Reston Express Line	Reston	↔		Interstate 66	Discontinued in 1996.
5E, 5G, 5H; South Reston Express Line	Franklin Farm, Reston	↔		Interstate 66	
5E1	Reston	↔	Downtown	Dulles Toll Road; Interstate 66; VA State Route 110; Interstate 395	
5F	Franklin Farm, Reston	↔			
5J		↔			
5K; Chain Bridge Road Line	Rosslyn station	↔	Fairfax	Chain Bridge Road	
5N; Chain Bridge Road Line		↔			
5P		↔			
5S; Herndon-West Falls Church Line	Herndon	↔	West Falls Church station; Ballston–MU station	Leesburg Pike	5S was transferred to the Fairfax Connector in 1994.
5W		↔			
5Y; Herndon Express Line		↔			
5Z; Tysons Corner Express Line		↔			
6A; Bradlee-South Fairlington Line		↔			
6B, 6E, 6F; Bradlee-South Fairlington Line	Pentagon station	↔		King Radford Street	Discontinued March 11, 1984.
6D	Pentagon station	↔	US Route 1 and Glebe Road		
6G	Braddock Road station	↔	Pentagon station		
6L	Park Center	↔	Pentagon station		
6P		↔			
7B; Lincolnia-Park Center-Pentagon Line	Pentagon station	↔	NVCC Alexandria campus	Interstate 395	Discontinued on March 29, 2015, replaced by 28G.
7C, 7P; Park Center–Pentagon Line	Park Center (2701 Park Center Drive)	↔	Pentagon station	Interstate 395; Walter Reed Drive	Formerly part of the Lincolnia-North Fairlington Line until December 2010; Formerly part of the Lincolnia-Park Center-Pentagon Line until December 18, 2016.; 7B endpoint changed from Southern Towers to Northern Virginia Community College-Alexandria on March 30, 2014.; 7B was replaced by the 28G on March 29, 2015.; 7H was discontinued March 27, 2016.; Suspended on March 18, 2020; later discontinued by September 5, 2021.
7D; Lincolnia-Park Center-Pentagon Line	Pentagon station	↔	Southern Towers Apartments (Stratford Bldg.)	Interstate 395	Discontinued on June 17, 2012.
7E; Lincolnia-North Fairlington Line	Pentagon station	↔	Southern Towers Apartments (Stratford Bldg.)	Interstate 395	Discontinued on June 30, 2013, replaced by 7Y.
7F, 7Y; Lincolnia–North Fairlington Line	7F Lincolnia (Lincolnia Rd & Breckenridge Pl); 7Y Southern Towers Apartments (Stratford Bldg.)	↔	7F Pentagon station; 7Y Farragut Square	Interstate 395; VA State Route 110 (7Y); Constitution Ave. NW (7Y)	Discontinued on September 5, 2021; replaced by Route 7A.
7G, 7L, 7M; Lincolnia-North Fairlington Line	Pentagon station	↔		Interstate 395	Discontinued June 26, 1983, replaced by 7D, 7E, 7W, 7X, 8W, & 8X.; 7M was reincarnated as the Mark Center-Pentagon Line in 2011.
7H; Lincolnia-Park Center-Pentagon Line	Pentagon station	↔	Lincolnia (Lincolnia Rd & Quantrell Av)	Interstate 395	Discontinued on March 27, 2016.
7W; Lincolnia–Pentagon Line	Lincolnia (Lincolnia Rd & Quantrell Av)	↔	Pentagon station	Interstate 395	Formerly part of the Lincolnia-North Fairlington Line until December 2010.; Formerly part of the Lincolnia-Park Center-Pentagon Line until December 18, 2016.; 7X service to Arbor Park was discontinued March 27, 2016. All 7X trips begin/end on Lincolnia Road & Quantrill Avenue in Lincolnia.; Route 7X was replaced by the 7W on June 25, 2017.; Discontinued on September 5, 2021, and replaced by DASH Route 35.
7X; Lincolnia-Pentagon Line	Pentagon station	↔	Lincolnia (Lincolnia Rd & Quantrell Av)	Interstate 395	Discontinued on June 25, 2017, replaced by the 7W.
8M; Foxchase-Seminary Valley Line	Southwest Mall	↔	Shirley Duke	Interstate 395	Discontinued June 26, 1983, replaced by 8W & 8X.
8S, 8Z; Foxchase–Seminary Valley Line	8S Quaker Lane (& Radford Street); 8Z Quaker Lane (& Osage Street)	↔	Pentagon station	Interstate 395	8X was replaced by the 8W on June 30, 2013.; From May 25, 2019, to September 8, 2019, temporary Weekday Midday Service was added to the 8S and 8Z due to the Blue/Yellow Line summer shutdown.; Suspended on March 16, 2020; later discontinued by September 5, 2021.; 8Z is replaced by 21C on June 6, 2021.
8X; Foxchase-Seminary Valley Line	Pentagon station	↔	Quaker Lane (& Osage Street)	Interstate 395	Discontinued on June 30, 2013, replaced by 8W.
8Y		↔			Discontinued on September 24, 1978, replaced by 21C.
9A; Huntington-Pentagon Line	Pentagon station	↔	Huntington station	Jefferson Davis Highway	Discontinued on June 26, 2016, replaced by 10A.
9B; Hunting Towers–Potomac Yard–Crystal City Line	Hunting Towers	↔	Crystal City station	Crystal Drive; Clark Street; Jefferson Davis Highway; Washington Street	Named Richmond Highway Line (along with Route 9A and Route 9E) until June 26, 2005; Discontinued on June 25, 2006, replaced by DASH AT10.
9C, 9D, 9F, 9G; Fort Belvoir–Pentagon Line	Fort Belvoir	↔	Pentagon station		Discontinued on June 29, 1997, and replaced by routes 9A, 9B, and 9E.
9E; Huntington-Potomac Yard-Pentagon Line	Braddock Road station	↔	Rosslyn station	Jefferson Davis Highway	Discontinued on March 30, 2014, replaced by 10S.
9P; Fort Belvoir Line		↔			Discontinued on June 26, 1983, and replaced by routes 9A and 9B.
9S; Crystal City-Potomac Yard Shuttle	Crystal City station			Clark Street; Crystal Drive; Potomac Avenue	This route operated as a loop; Replaced ART Route 90 on April 24, 2006.; Discontinued on August 24, 2014, replaced by Metroway.
10C, 10D; Alexandria–Arlington Line	10C: East Falls Church station; 10D: Seven Corners Transit Center	↔	Hunting Point	Mount Vernon Avenue; Williamsburg Boulevard; Little Falls Road; Yorktown Boulevard; Roosevelt Boulevard (10D)	Discontinued on December 30, 2001, and replaced by route 10B and ART routes 51 and 52.
10E, 10N; Alexandria–Pentagon Line	10E: Hunting Point; 10N: Ronald Reagan Washington National Airport station	↔	Pentagon station	Mount Vernon Avenue	10E was suspended on March 16, 2020, while 10N was suspended on August 21, 2020; both were later discontinued by September 5, 2021.
10P; Mount Vernon Avenue-Potomac Yard-Crystal City Line	Crystal City station	↔	Braddock Road station	Mount Vernon Avenue; Glebe Road; Jefferson Davis Highway; Crystal Drive	Discontinued on June 25, 2006, replaced by DASH AT10
10R, 10S; Hunting Towers-Pentagon Line	10R Hunting Towers; 10S Braddock Road station	↔	Rosslyn station	Mount Vernon Avenue (10R); Jefferson Davis Highway (10S); Washington Street (10R)	Discontinued on June 26, 2016.
10S, 10T; Alexandria–Arlington–Pentagon Line	Hunting Towers	↔			Discontinued on March 11, 1984.
11A; National Airport-Washington Line	Federal Triangle	↔	Mount Vernon	George Washington Memorial Parkway; Washington Street; Fort Hunt Road	
11B; National Airport-Landmark Line	Rose Hill	↔	National Airport	George Washington Memorial Parkway; Washington Street	
11C; National Airport-Landmark Line	Mount Vernon Hospital	↔	National Airport	George Washington Memorial Parkway; Washington Street; Huntington Avenue; N Kings Highway; Richmond Highway	11C was reincarnated as the Mount Vernon Line on June 6, 2021.
11C; Mount Vernon Line	Mount Vernon (Mt Vernon Highway & Grist Mill Woods Rd)	↔	Braddock Road station	George Washington Memorial Parkway; Mount Vernon Memorial Parkway	Weekday peak hour service only (AM to Braddock Road, PM to Mount Vernon); Introduced on June 6, 2021, as a replacement to the suspended route 11Y.; Was replaced by the Mount Vernon-Potomac Park Shuttle (DC3) between September 10, 2022, until May 2023 due to the Yellow Line suspension which was later fully discontinued on June 25, 2023, after the 11Y was reinstated.
11D; National Airport-Springfield Line	Springfield	↔	National Airport	George Washington Memorial Parkway; Washington Street; Franconia Road	
11E	Federal Triangle	↔	Landmark	George Washington Memorial Parkway; Washington Street; Duke Street	This route is discontinued when Huntington Station opened.; Replaced by 29K, 29L, 29M, 29N.; Route was further replaced by DASH AT8
11F; National Airport-Landmark Line		↔			
11G		↔			
11H, 11T; Mount Vernon Line	National Airport	↔	Mount Vernon		Discontinued in 1991.
11M, 11P; National Airport-Washington Line	National Airport	↔			
11P; Hunting Towers–Potomac Yard–Crystal City Line	Hunting Towers	↔	Crystal City station	Crystal Drive; Jefferson Davis Highway; Washington Street	Once called the Mount Vernon Line, along with Routes 11H and 11X; later the Alexandria-National Airport Line; Renamed as Route 9B on September 26, 2004.
11W; National Airport-Washington Line		↔			
11X; National Airport-Landmark Line		↔			Discontinued March 11, 1984.
11Y, 11Z; National Airport-Washington Line	Woodlawn Plantation	↔	10th & Pennsylvania	11Y Was Changed To Mt Vernon Express in 2018	
12A, 12E, 12F, 12G; Centreville South Line	Centreville South	↔	Vienna station	Interstate 66	All routes discontinued on June 28, 2009. Replaced by Fairfax Connector.
12C, 12D; Centreville North Line	Sully Station/Westfields	↔	Vienna station	Interstate 66	All routes discontinued on June 28, 2009. Replaced by Fairfax Connector.
12L, 12M; Little Rocky Run-Vienna Line	12L Little Rocky Run; 12M Centreville North	↔	Vienna station	Interstate 66	All routes discontinued on June 28, 2009. Replaced by Fairfax Connector.
12R, 12S; Stringfellow Road-Vienna Line	Westfields	↔	Vienna station	Interstate 66	All routes discontinued on June 28, 2009. Replaced by Fairfax Connector.
12A, 12E; Alexandria–Pentagon Line	Pentagon station	↔	Federal Triangle		Discontinued on March 11, 1984.
12B; Alexandria–Pentagon Line	Pentagon station	↔	Federal Triangle		Discontinued on June 26, 1983, and replaced by 12E & 15B
13A, 13B; National Airport-Pentagon-Washington Line	Pentagon station	↔	Federal Triangle	VA State Route 110; Arlington Memorial Bridge; Constitution Avenue NW; Independence Avenue SW; 14th Street Bridge	Discontinued on December 19, 2010, and replaced by routes 7Y and 16F.
13C, 13D; Pentagon-Washington Line	Pentagon station	↔	Capitol Hill	VA State Route 110; Arlington Memorial Bridge; 14th Street Bridge	
13E; Pentagon-Washington Line	Pentagon station	↔	Federal Triangle	VA State Route 110; Arlington Memorial Bridge; Constitution Avenue NW; Independence Avenue SW; 14th Street Bridge	
13F, 13G; National Airport-Pentagon-Washington Line	Ronald Reagan Washington National Airport station	↔	Federal Triangle	VA State Route 110; Arlington Memorial Bridge; Constitution Avenue NW; Independence Avenue SW; 14th Street Bridge	Discontinued on March 30, 2014, and replaced by the 13Y.
13M; Pentagon-Rosslyn Line	Pentagon station	↔	Rosslyn station		
13Y; Arlington–Union Station Line	Ronald Reagan Washington National Airport station	↔	Washington Union Station	E Street; 14th Street Bridge	Discontinued on June 25, 2017, and replaced by the 10N.
14A, 14B, 14C, 14D; Montgomery-Tysons Beltway Express	Tysons-Westpark Transit Center	↔	14A, 14B: Bethesda station; 14C, 14D: Lakeforest Transit Center	American Legion Bridge; Capital Beltway	Discontinued on December 27, 2003.
14E		↔			Discontinued on June 26, 1983, and replaced by 14A and 14B.
14M; Montgomery-Tysons Beltway Express	Bethesda station	↔	Tysons-Westpark Transit Center	American Legion Bridge; Capital Beltway	Renamed route 14A on June 25, 2000.
14T, 14W; Tysons-Westpark Shuttle	Tysons-Westpark Transit Center			Leesburg Pike (14T); Old Courthouse Road (14T); International Drive (14T); Dolley Madison Boulevard (14W)	Operated as loops; Discontinued on June 30, 2002
15A; Alexandria–Pentagon Line	Pentagon station	↔			Discontinued on March 11, 1984.
15B	Pentagon City station	↔		Army-Navy Drive	
15D; Alexandria–Pentagon Line		↔			Discontinued on March 11, 1984.
15F	Pentagon station	↔			Renamed 15A on September 24, 1978.
15K; Chain Bridge Road Line	East Falls Church station	↔	Langley; Rosslyn station (First morning northbound trip)	Chain Bridge Road; Dolly Madison Blvd	15K & 15L used to serve George Mason University until their route south of Tysons Corner Shopping Center was replaced by the "reincarnated" 15M in 2009.; 15K & 15L western terminal changed from Tysons Corner Center to East Falls Church Station on December 29, 2013.; Route 15L was replaced by the 15K on June 25, 2017.; Transferred to Fairfax Connector and renamed to Route 715 on July 10, 2021.
15L; Chain Bridge Road Line	East Falls Church station	↔	Rosslyn station	Chain Bridge Road; Dolly Madison Boulevard	Discontinued on June 25, 2017, and replaced by 15K.
15M; George Mason University-Tysons Corner Line	Tysons station	↔	George Mason University	Chain Bridge Road	Discontinued on June 26, 2016.
16B, 16J, 16P; Columbia Pike Line	Pentagon station	↔	16B, 16J, 16P Culmore (Glen Carlyn & Vista Drives); 16B Annandale (Patriot & Americana Drives)	Columbia Pike	Discontinued on June 24, 2018; replaced by 16A, 16C, 16E & 16H.
16C; Columbia Pike Line	Pentagon station	↔	Culmore	Columbia Pike	Discontinued on September 7, 2003.; 16C was brought back into service on June 24, 2018.
16D; Columbia Pike Line	Pentagon station	↔	Annandale (Patriot & Americana Drives)	Columbia Pike	Discontinued on March 29, 2015; replaced by 16A & 16L.
16F; Columbia Pike–Federal Triangle Line	Culmore (Glen Carlyn & Vista Drives)	↔	Federal Triangle (11th & E Streets, NW)	Renamed 16X on December 30, 2012.	
16G, 16H; Columbia Pike–Pentagon City Line	16G Arlington Mill (Dinwiddie St & Columbia Pike); 16H Skyline City (Seminary Rd & Magnolia La)	↔	Pentagon station	Columbia Pike	16H originally terminated at Pentagon City station until it was extended to Crystal City station in 2005; absorbed the 16W's route & extended to Skyline City from Bailey's Crossroads in December 2010.; 16H service between Pentagon City & Crystal City was discontinued on March 27, 2016 & was replaced by the new Metroway service extension, which opened on April 17, 2016.; Daily service was added to the 16H on June 24, 2018.; Combined into one single route and renamed into Route 16M on June 25, 2023. Service to Arlington Mill was discontinued.
16K; Columbia Heights West-Pentagon City Line	Pentagon station	↔	Arlington Mill (Dinwiddie St & Columbia Pike)	Columbia Pike	Discontinued on June 24, 2018, and replaced by 16G.
16L; Annandale–Skyline City–Pentagon Line	Annandale (Heritage Dr. & McWhorter Pl.)	↔	Pentagon station	Columbia Pike; Seminary Road; Interstate 395	Originally part of the Columbia Pike Line until 1987, when it became the Columbia Pike Express Line.; Changed to the Annandale-Skyline City-Pentagon Line in 2003.; 16L was extended to McWhorter Place in Annandale, replacing the 16D & 29H on March 29, 2015.; Suspended as of March 16, 2020; later discontinued by September 5, 2021.
16S, 16U, 16X; Shirlington-Pentagon Line	Pentagon station	↔	Shirlington (Quincy Street & 28th Street S.)	Columbia Pike (16U, 16X); Four Mile Run Drive (16X); Interstate 395 (16S)	Discontinued on September 7, 2003. 16S was replaced by ART 87X in the late 2000s. 16U and 16X was replaced by 16G, 16H, 16K, and 16W.
16V; Shirlington-Pentagon Line	Pentagon station	↔	Shirlington		Discontinued on June 26, 1983.
16W; Columbia Heights West–Pentagon City Line	Pentagon station	↔	Skyline City	Columbia Pike	Discontinued on December 19, 2010, and replaced by 16H.
16X; Columbia Pike–Federal Triangle Line	Culmore (Glen Carlyn & Vista Drives)	↔	Federal Triangle (11th & F Streets, NW)	Columbia Pike; 14th Street Bridge; Independence Avenue SW	Discontinued on June 24, 2018, and replaced by 16C.
17A, 17F; Kings Park Line	Pentagon station	↔	17A George Mason University; 17F Kings Park West (Twinbrook Dr & Twinbrook Run Dr)	Braddock Road; Shirley Highway	Discontinued on June 25, 2017; replaced by 17B, 17G, 17H, 17K, 17L, 17M.
17C		↔			
17H; Kings Park Express Line	Kings Park West (Twinbrook Dr & Twinbrook Run Dr)	↔	Pentagon station	Braddock Road; Capital Beltway; Shirley Highway	Merged into route 17K on June 6, 2021.
17L; Kings Park Express Line	Kings Park West (Twinbrook Dr & Twinbrook Run Dr)	↔	Pentagon station	Braddock Road; Capital Beltway; Shirley Highway	Suspended as of March 16, 2020; later discontinued by September 5, 2021.
17P, 17Z	Kings Park	↔	Downtown D.C.	Braddock Road; Shirley Highway; Little River Turnpike	
18A, 18B; Springfield Line	Pentagon station	↔	Bren Marr	Shirley Highway	Discontinued on June 29, 1997, and replaced 18E, 18F, & 18G.
18C; Orange Hunt-Burke Center Line		↔			
18D, 18N	Pentagon station	↔	Van Dorn Street Station (18D)		Discontinued in 1992 and replaced by Fairfax Connector.
18E, 18F; Springfield Line	Pentagon station	↔	Springfield (Commercial Dr & Industrial Rd)	Shirley Highway	Discontinued on June 26, 2016.
18H; Orange Hunt Line	Orange Hunt (Huntsman Blvd & Cork County Court)	↔	Pentagon station	Old Keene Mill Road; Shirley Highway	Merged with Route 18G on September 5, 2021.
18K; Orange Hunt Line	Orange Hunt	↔		Keene Mill Road; Huntsman Boulevard; Sydenstricker Road; Field Master Drive; Conservation Drive	Discontinued on June 29, 1997, and replaced by routes 18H, and 18R.
18L		↔			Discontinued on June 29, 1997, and replaced 18S.
18M	West Springfield	↔	Southwest Mall		
18R, 18S; Burke Centre Line	Franconia–Springfield station	↔	18R Burke (Coffer Woods Dr & Blincoe Ct); 18S Burke Centre (Oak Leather Dr & Oakenshaw Ct)	Old Keene Mill Road	Discontinued on June 25, 2017; replaced by 18H & 18P.
18X, 18Y; Burke Centre Line	Springfield	↔	Pentagon station	Old Keene Mill Road	Discontinued on September 24, 1978, and replaced by 18A & 18E.
19G; Huntington Line	Pentagon station	↔			
19L; Lorton Express Line		↔			
20A; Fair Oaks Line	Fairfax Government Center	↔	Vienna/Fairfax–GMU station	Interstate 66	Transferred to Fairfax Connector at some point; renumbered 621
20G, 20P	Fair Lakes	↔	Vienna/Fairfax–GMU station	Interstate 66	Transferred to Fairfax Connector at some point; renumbered 623, and 622 respectively in June 2001.
20E; Fairfax City Express	Fairfax	↔		Interstate 66	Discontinued in 1986, when Vienna station opened and Fairfax's CUE Bus system was extended to it.
20F, 20W, 20X, 20Y; Chantilly-Greenbriar Line	Franklin Farm (20F); Chantilly (20W, 20X); Sullyfield Circle (20Y)	↔	Vienna/Fairfax–GMU station	Lee Jackson Highway; Interstate 66	Discontinued on June 28, 2009. Replaced by Fairfax Connector.
21A, 21D; Landmark–Pentagon Line	Landmark (S. Reynolds Street & Duke Street)	↔	Pentagon station	Interstate 395	21A originally operated to Federal Triangle until the 1980s to 1990s.; 21A & 21B were originally the 27E & 27F until September 24, 1978.; Once called the Landmark Express Line (along with 21B & 21C) until the early 2000s.; From May 25, 2019, to September 8, 2019, temporary Weekday Midday service was added to the 21A due to the Blue/Yellow Line shutdown.; Suspended as of March 16, 2020; later discontinued by September 5, 2021 being replaced by Route 21C on June 6, 2021.; 21A is replaced by 21C on June 6, 2021.
21B, 21C, 21D, 21F; Landmark-Pentagon Line	21B, 21C, 21D: Landmark (Stevenson Avenue & Whiting Street); 21F: Landmark (6295 Edsall Road Office Complex)	↔	Pentagon station	Interstate 395	Routes 21C and 21F discontinued on June 28, 2009.; Routes 21A, 21B, and 21D truncated to single Route 21A.; Once called the Landmark Express Line.; 21D was reincarnated on March 28, 2010; 21C was reincarnated as the Landmark-Holmes Run Parkway Line on June 6, 2021.
22B; Pentagon–Army-Navy Drive–Shirley Park Line	Shirley Park (S. Meade Street & 28th Street S.)	↔	Pentagon station	Army-Navy Drive	Discontinued on June 28, 2009. Replaced by ART Route 87.; Once was part of the Walker Chapel-Pentagon Line until 2003, served to Seven Corners Transit Center via Williamsburg Blvd. and East Falls Church Station.
22B; Barcroft–South Fairlington Line	Ballston–MU station	↔	Barcroft (Columbia Pike & Four Mile Run Dr)	George Mason Drive	Discontinued on June 24, 2018; replaced by 22A & 22C.
22C, 22F; Walker Chapel–Pentagon Line	Pentagon station	↔	Ballston–MU station	Army Navy Drive; George Mason Drive; N Glebe Road; N Quincy Street (22F); Military Road (22F)	Discontinued on December 29, 2003.; Replaced by 22A (South) and ART 53 (North).; 22C only operated during off peak hours.; 22C & 22F were reincarnated as the Barcroft-South Fairlington Line on June 21, 2015.
22C; Barcroft–South Fairlington Line	Ballston–MU station	↔	Pentagon station	George Mason Drive; Interstate 395	Suspended as of March 16, 2020; later discontinued by September 5, 2021.
23B, 23E		↔			23B was reincarnated into the McLean–Crystal City Line in 2014.
23C; McLean–Crystal City Line	Langley CIA Headquarters	↔	Crystal City station	Old Dominion Drive; Glebe Road	Discontinued on March 30, 2014.
23M, 23N	McLean Hamlet	↔	Ballston–MU station		
23W; Westpark Shuttle Line	Tysons-Westpark Transit Center	↔	Tysons Corner Center	Park Run Dr	23W was a temporary route between Tyson-Westpark Transit Center & Tyson Corner Center that was introduced on March 30, 2014.; Discontinued on July 26, 2014, after the Silver Line Opened.
23X; Great Falls Bus Line	Great Falls	↔	West Falls Church station	Old Dominion Drive	Discontinued in 1991.
24A		↔			
24F		↔			
24M; Ballston-Pentagon Line	Ballston–MU station	↔	Pentagon station	Wilson Boulevard; Washington Boulevard; Walter Reed Drive	Truncated and renamed as Route 24P trips on December 28, 2003.
24P; Ballston-Pentagon Line	Ballston–MU station	↔	Pentagon station	Wilson Boulevard; Washington Boulevard; Courthouse Road	Discontinued September 28, 2009. Replaced by ART Route 42.; ART 42 launched September 30, 2006, with the takeover of Saturday Metrobus 24P service, leading to weekday service only.; No Sunday Service
24T; McLean Hamlet-East Falls Church Line	Tysons-Westpark Transit Station	↔	East Falls Church station	Westmoreland Street	Discontinued July 26, 2014, after the Silver Line opened.
25A, 25C, 25D, 25E; Ballston-Bradlee-Pentagon Line	Pentagon station	↔	25A, 25E Ballston–MU station; 25C, 25D NVCC (Alexandria Campus)	Carlin Springs Road; King Street; Braddock Road; Interstate 395	Discontinued on June 21, 2015; replaced by 22A, 22B, 22C, 22F.
25F, 25G, 25J, 25P, 25R; Ballston-Bradlee-Pentagon Line	Pentagon station	↔	25F, 25J, 25P, 25R Ballston–MU station; 25G Fort Ward	Carlin Springs Road (25F, 25J, 25P, 25R); King Street (25F, 25G, 25J); Interstate 395 (25F, 25J, 25P, 25R); Army Navy Drive (25P, 25R)	Simplified and restructured as Route 25A, 25C, and 25D trips on December 30, 2007
25S		↔			Discontinued on March 11, 1984.
26A, 26E; East Falls Church Line (GEORGE)	26A West Falls Church station; 26E Falls Church	↔	East Falls Church station	Broad Street	Transferred to Arlington Transit on July 6, 2009.; 26A was reincarnated as the Annandale-East Falls Church Line on December 29, 2013.
26G, 26H; Burke Centre-Dunn Loring Line		↔			Discontinued in 1996.
26T	Springfield Mall	↔	Tysons Corner Shopping Center		
26W; West Falls Church Line (GEORGE)	Falls Church	↔	West Falls Church station	Broad Street	Transferred to Arlington Transit on July 6, 2009.
27B; Hayfield-Franconia Line		↔			
27E, 27F; Landmark Express Line	Landmark Mall	↔	27E Federal Triangle; 27F Pentagon station		Renamed 21A & 21B on September 24, 1978.
27H	Pentagon station	↔			
27K	Springfield Town Center	↔	Pentagon station		
27P; Hayfield-Franconia Line		↔			Discontinued on June 26, 1983.
27W	Pentagon station	↔	Beacon Hill	Southgate Drive; South Kings Highway	
27X	Pentagon station	↔			
27Y, 27Z; Saratoga Line		↔			
28B; Alexandria-Tysons Corner Line	Tysons Corner	↔	King Street–Old Town station	Leesburg Pike	Discontinued on December 27, 2009.
28C; NVCC Alexandria-King Street Line	NVCC Alexandria Campus	↔	King Street–Old Town station	King Street	Discontinued in mid 2002. Replaced by DASH AT6
28T; Tysons Corner-West Falls Church Line	Tysons-Westpark Transit Center	↔	West Falls Church station	Leesburg Pike	Discontinued on July 26, 2014, after the Silver Line opened.
28G; Skyline City Line	Skyline City (5113 S George Mason Drive)	↔	Pentagon station	Interstate 395	28G replaced the 7B between Fillmore Avenue and Pentagon station via Fillmore Avenue on March 29, 2015.; Discontinued on June 6, 2021, replaced by 22F.
28X; Leesburg Pike Limited Line	East Falls Church station	↔	Mark Center	Leesburg Pike	Discontinued on June 25, 2017.
29A, 29B; Annandale Line	Pentagon station	↔	Annandale	Leesburg Pike	29A discontinued on June 26, 1983.; 29B was renamed 29G on June 26, 1983.
29C; Annandale Line	Pentagon station	↔	NVCC–Annandale	Little River Turnpike; Shirley Highway	Transferred to Fairfax Connector and renamed to Route 834 on July 10, 2021.
29E, 29H, 29X; Annandale Line	Pentagon station	↔	29H Annandale (Heritage Dr. & McWhorter Pl.); 29E, 29X NVCC-Annandale	Little River Turnpike; Capital Beltway; Interstate 395	Discontinued on March 29, 2015; 29E replaced by 29G, 29W; 29H was replaced by 16L; 29X was renamed 29W.
29L	Pentagon station	↔			
29M		↔			
29W; Braeburn Drive–Pentagon Express Line	NVCC–Annandale	↔	Pentagon station	Little River Turnpike; Capital Beltway; Shirley Highway	29W was formerly known as the 29X until March 29, 2015.; Transferred to Fairfax Connector and renamed to Route 835 on July 10, 2021.
29Z	Pentagon station	↔			
38A, 38C; Ballston-Farragut Square Line	Farragut Square	↔	Ballston–MU station		
38F; Ballston-Farragut Square Line	Farragut Square	↔	Ballston–MU station		Discontinued on January 2, 1981, and replaced by 38A.
S80, S91 (TAGS); Springfield Circulator	S80 (East) Hilton Springfield; S80 (West) Metro Park Building; S91 Springfield Mall	↔	Franconia–Springfield station	Loisdale Court (S80); Frontier Drive; Franconia-Springfield Parkway (S80)	Transferred to Fairfax Connector and renamed routes Routes 350 and 351 on January 3, 2021.
S81; Springfield Circulator	Hilton Springfield; Metro Park Building	↔	Franconia–Springfield station	Franconia–Springfield Parkway	Discontinued on September 26, 2004, and replaced by route S80.
S82; Metro Park Shuttle	Franconia–Springfield station	↔	Metro Park Building	Franconia–Springfield Parkway	Discontinued on September 26, 2004, and replaced by route S80.
V1; Pan Am Parking Lot/Vienna Shuttle Line	Vienna/Fairfax–GMU station	↔	Pan Am Shopping Center		Discontinued on January 22, 2001.; Reincarnated as the Benning Heights–M Street Line on June 21, 2015.
W99; West Ox Road Shuttle	Vienna/Fairfax–GMU station	↔	McConnell Public Safety and Transportation Operations Center	Interstate 66	
Y31; Yorktown High School Line	Yorktown High School	↔	Washington-Lee High School (Washington Blvd. & N. Quincy Street)	George Mason Drive; Washington Blvd.	Introduced on March 3, 2008.; Renamed route 38B in mid to late 2010; One way route, PM service only; No stops between terminal points; Route renames to 38B when arrived at terminus

== See also ==
- List of Metrobus routes (Washington, D.C.)
- List of Metrobus routes in Washington, D.C.
- List of Metrobus routes in Maryland
