= Columbia Pike–Federal Triangle Line =

16F, 16X
- Columbia Pike–Federal Triangle Line

Overview
- System: Metrobus
- Operator: Washington Metropolitan Area Transit Authority
- Garage: Four Mile Run
- Livery: MetroExtra
- Status: Replaced by Route 16C, later replaced by Route A49
- Began service: 16F: December 19, 2010; 16X: December 30, 2012
- Ended service: 16F: December 30, 2012; 16X: June 24, 2018

Route
- Locale: Fairfax County, Arlington County
- Communities served: Culmore, Bailey's Crossroads, Columbia Forest, Arlington Mill, Barcroft, Arlington Heights, Penrose, Federal Triangle
- Landmarks served: United States Air Force Memorial, Pentagon station, National Mall, Federal Triangle
- Start: Culmore
- Via: Columbia Pike
- End: Federal Triangle station
- Timetable: Columbia Pike–Federal Triangle Line

The Columbia Pike–Federal Triangle Line, designated Route 16F, or Route 16X, was a rush hour-only MetroExtra bus route that was operated by the Washington Metropolitan Area Transit Authority between Federal Triangle station of the Blue, Orange and Silver lines of the Washington Metro and the neighborhood of Culmore. This line was part of the Pike Ride service, which served through Columbia Pike. This line provides service from Federal Triangle in Washington, D.C., to the neighborhood of Culmore in Fairfax County. The line was merged with the 16C on June 24, 2018.

== History ==
=== Route 16F ===
Route 16F was initially part of the Columbia Pike line, providing faster service from Route 16B. 16F operated during peak hours only, serving to Pentagon Station in the morning, and the neighborhood of Culmore in the afternoon. Route 16F was created on June 26, 1983, operating between Culmore and Pentagon station providing express service for route 16B. The 16F served limited stops in Arlington County, and local stops in Bailey's Crossroads and Culmore. 16F was later extended to Federal Triangle in Washington D.C., and the line was renamed to "Columbia Pike–Federal Triangle Line" on December 19, 2010. The 16F served all stops in Washington D.C. following the changes. In 2012, the 16F became a MetroExtra route in 2012, along with route 16Y of the Columbia Pike–Farragut Square Line. The 16F continued to operate until December 30, 2012, when the route was renumbered to 16X.

=== Route 16X ===
Route 16X was formerly part of the Shirlington–Pentagon Line along with the 16S, and 16U before 2003, operating between Pentagon station of the Blue, and Yellow lines, and Shirlington, via the neighborhood of Barcroft. Route 16X also operated alongside Routes 22A, 22B, 22C, and 22F of the Walker Chapel–Pentagon Line. The old 16X was discontinued on September 7, 2003, and the line was replaced by the Columbia Heights West–Pentagon City Line, which consists routes 16G. 16H, 16K, and 16W. The 16X returned in service on December 30, 2012, replacing the 16F. The new 16X runs the same route as the 16F ran. Like the 16F, the 16X brings in faster service alongside the 16Y in Columbia Pike. The 16X was reintroduced, as part of the WMATA's "better bus" MetroExtra project and Pike Ride, to bring reliable service in Columbia Pike. Route 16X continued in service, until June 24, 2018, when Route 16C was reintroduced. Route 16X was discontinued, as the 16C replaced the route, returning to the Columbia Pike Line. Following discontinuation, the 16Y is the only MetroExtra route to operate in Virginia.

In 2010, WMATA proposed three options to the 16F. All three options will replace the 13A and the 13B.

- The first option was to operate from Pentagon station to Washington D.C. via Arlington Memorial Bridge and will operate along 23rd Street NW, Constitution Avenue NW, 12th Street NW, Pennsylvania Avenue NW, 10th Street NW to the current Route 13 terminal at Federal Triangle station.
- The second option was similar to the first option, however, the 16F would operate via 23rd Street, Constitution Avenue, 7th Street, Independence Avenue, 12th Street, C Street to Smithsonian station. The trip would be longer due to routing on Constitution Avenue and Memorial Bridge on Southwest D.C.
- The third option was to operate from Pentagon station to Washington D.C. via 14th Street Bridge and will operate along 14th Street, Pennsylvania Avenue, 10th Street to current Route 13 terminal Federal Triangle station.

From the three options, the 16F will operate on limited stops on Columbia Pike, like its original route, but will serve in all stops in Washington D.C.

Beginning on December 19, 2010, additional 16F trips will operate between Pentagon station and Federal Triangle station replacing routes 13A and 13B from the National Airport–Pentagon–Washington Line. These trips will operate on early morning and peak periods. The short trips will operate on peak directional; full eastbound trip to Federal Triangle and short westbound trip to Pentagon station during morning peak hours, while afternoon peak hours will operate full westbound trip to Culmore. Afternoon eastbound trips runs between Pentagon station and Federal Triangle. Although, select rush hour trips will run on short intervals on both directions. These changes remained the same after the line was renamed from 16F to 16X.

On March 27, 2016, the 16X converted one morning eastbound trip and three afternoon westbound trips to operate on full route, to improve peak riderships.

In 2016 during WMATA's FY2018 budget, it was proposed to eliminate route 16X between Pentagon station and Federal Triangle station to reduce costs. According to performance measure it goes as the following for WMATA:

Performance Measures	Route 16X	WMATA Guideline	Pass/Fail
Average Daily Riders	1,111	432	Pass
Cost Recovery	29.41%	16.6%	Pass
Subsidy per Rider	$2.81	$4.81	Pass
Riders per Trip	26.1	10.7	Pass
Riders per Revenue Mile	3.9	1.3	Pass

On June 24, 2018, major bus changes occurred in Columbia Pike. The 16X was eliminated and merged with the 16C due to multiple routes running through Columbia Pike in Arlington. The elimination of the 16X was to improve frequencies, and to reduce bus bunching on Columbia Pike, as there was routes 16A, 16B, 16G, 16H, 16J, 16K, 16P, and 16Y, operating on Columbia Pike. The 16X, alongside routes 16B, 16J, and 16P, was replaced by route 16C. This means that the entire route returns to the Columbia Pike Line, although the 16C only operates to Federal Triangle during peak hours, and operates on full routes instead of shortened routes. The short trips was permanently discontinued due to low riderships, as the Washington Metro Blue Line serves as an alternative of the short 16X trips. The 16C trips to Federal Triangle remained in service until March 13, 2020 when it was suspended due to the COVID-19 pandemic, later fully discontinued by September 5, 2021, which technically eliminated the 16X entirely.

As part of WMATA's Better Bus Redesign Network beginning on June 29, 2025, service from Culmore to Washington D.C. was reincarnated as the A49, with new service operating to Metro Center station, combining the former 16C and 16Y routing between the two points and extensions.
