= Leesburg Pike Line =

Daily bus route operated by WMATA

F20
- Leesburg Pike Line

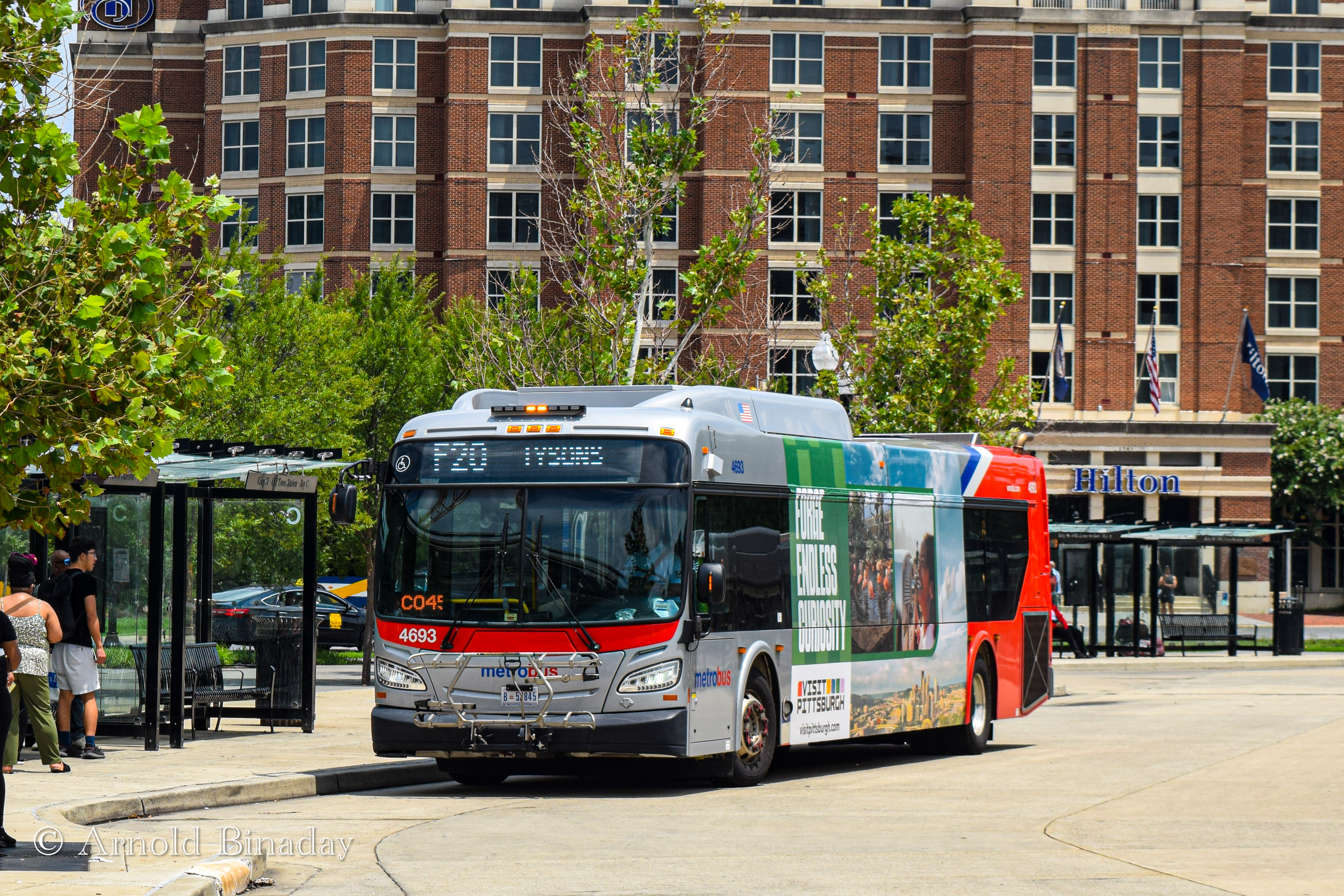
- Route F20 at King Street-Old Town station

Overview
- System: Metrobus
- Operator: Washington Metropolitan Area Transit Authority
- Garage: Cinder Bed
- Livery: Local
- Status: In Service
- Began service: 1939
- Ended service: 28B: December 27, 2009; 28A: June 29, 2025

Route
- Locale: Fairfax County; Arlington County; City of Falls Church; City of Alexandria
- Communities served: Tysons Corner, West Falls Church, East Falls Church, Falls Church, Seven Corners, Culmore, Bailey's Crossroads, Skyline City, Seminary West, Old Town Alexandria
- Landmarks served: Tysons station, Tysons Corner Center, West Falls Church station, East Falls Church station, Seven Corners Transit Center, Northern Virginia Community College (Alexandria Campus), Southern Towers, Inova Alexandria Hospital, Foxchase, Alexandria Commons Shopping Center, Alexandria Union Station, King Street-Old Town station
- Start: Tysons station
- Via: Leesburg Pike
- End: King Street-Old Town station
- Other routes: F44 and A40

Service
- Level: Daily
- Frequency: 12 minutes (7 AM - 9 PM); 30 minutes (After 9 PM)
- Operates: 4:18 AM – 2:00 AM
- Ridership: 2,576,265 (FY 2025)
- Transfers: SmarTrip only
- Timetable: Leesburg Pike Line

The Leesburg Pike Line, designated Route F20, is a daily bus route operated by the Washington Metropolitan Area Transit Authority between Tysons station of the Silver Line of the Washington Metro and King Street-Old Town station of the Yellow and Blue Lines of the Washington Metro. The F20 trips run every 12 minutes between 7 AM and 9 PM and 30 minutes after 9 PM. This line provides service from Tysons Corner in Fairfax County to Old Town Alexandria. Route F20 trips are roughly 90 minutes long. It is the busiest metrobus route in Virginia at around 6,400 riders per weekday in 2023.

== Route description and service ==
The F20 operates out of Cinder Bed Division 7 days a week. The F20 operates via Leesburg Pike, Broad Street, Seminary Road and Duke Street throughout the entire route. In the Alexandria portion of the route, the F20 runs limited stop between Foxchase and King Street Station, while the remaining portions are local service. The F20 runs through the neighborhoods of Tysons Corner, Falls Church, Seven Corners, Culmore, Bailey's Crossroads, Skyline City, Seminary West, and Old Town Alexandria.

== History ==
=== Background ===
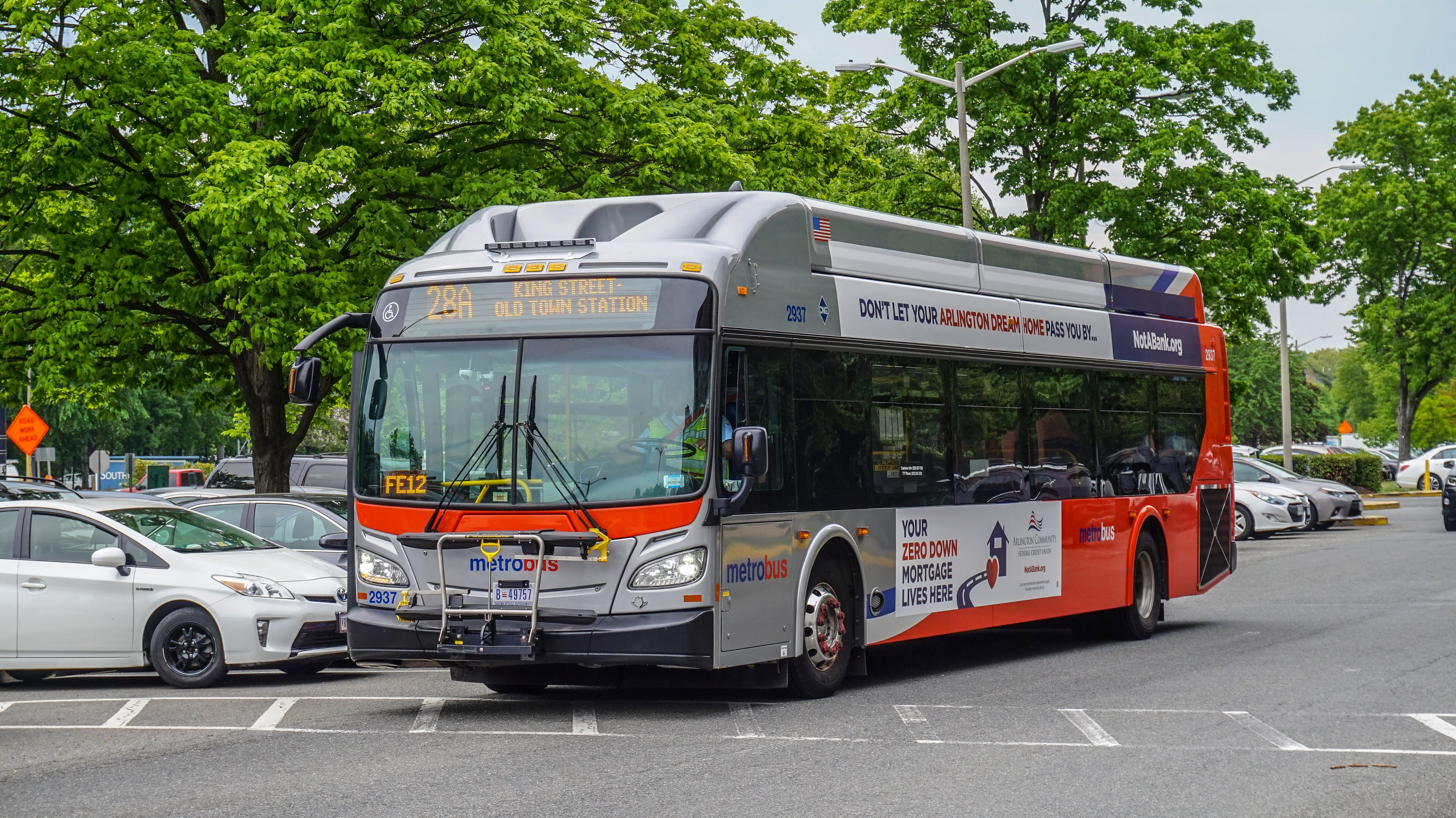
Former Route 28A at Southern Towers in the City of Alexandria in 2018

The Leesburg Pike Line was introduced in 1939, as the route was part of the Washington Virginia & Maryland Coach Company. There was also the Seven Corner Line, which also ran on the same line, which was operated by the Alexandria, Barcroft and Washington Transit Company. In 1973, WMATA operates the line, when it acquired all routes from the AB&W and the WV&M. From 1973 to 2025, the Leesburg Pike Line consists of all 28 line. The 28A provides reliable service in Leesburg Pike to connect from neighborhoods, to marketplaces, to landmarks, and to business.

=== Alexandria-Tysons Corner Line ===
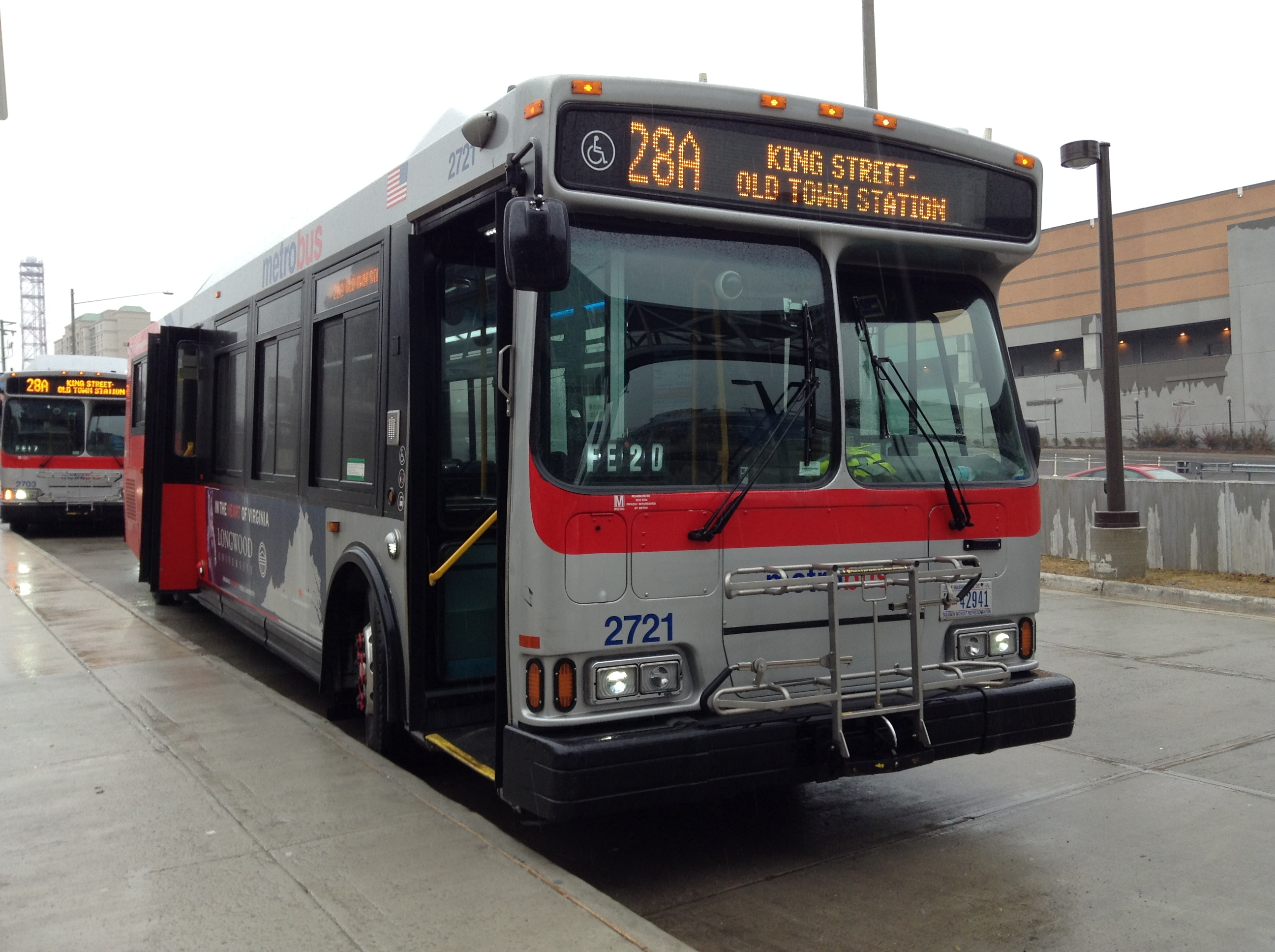
The Former 28A at Tysons Corner station (now Tysons station) in 2015

The Leesburg Pike Line was known as the Alexandria-Tysons Corner Line, as it runs between Old Town Alexandria, and Tysons Corner. The 28A initially ran via West Braddock Road, while the 28B ran via Seminary Road. The 28 line brings in service on the neighborhoods of North Ridge in the 28A, and Seminary Hills in the 28B. The 28A initially ran from Monday through Saturdays, while the 28B have daily service, although, select 28B weekday rush hour trips terminates at Bailey Crossroads. The Old Town Segment of the route was discontinued in 2002, and both routes was truncated to King Street - Old Town station.

In 2009, the 28B was discontinued, and the line is renamed to Leesburg Pike Line. The 28A now operates via King Street between Bradlee Shopping Center and King Street - Old Town station. The 28A extended service from Mondays through Saturdays to daily service. The 28A portion between Inova Alexandria Hospital and King Street Station became a limited-stop portion, bringing faster service in Alexandria. Alongside with these changes, the 28X was introduced, bringing limited stop service through Leesburg Pike during peak hours. The 28X was part of the Leesburg Pike Line, until January 29, 2012, when the 28X was renamed to the Leesburg Pike Limited Line, leaving the 28A the sole route of the line. The 28X continues to run as a MetroExtra route in June 2012, until its discontinuation on June 25, 2017. The 28A is one of the three Virginia Metrobus lines, in which serves the Silver Line stations. On July 26, 2014, the 28A brings service to Tysons Corner station, one of the five stations of the Silver Line that opened. This brings in bus connection to other routes which will also serve Tysons Corner station, as some other routes used to serve the Tysons Westpark Transit Station.

== Service Changes ==
Service between Old Town Alexandria and King Street - Old Town station has been discontinued on June 30, 2002. Service to Old Town Alexandria is provided by DASH.

On December 27, 2009, the 28B was discontinued, and service through North Ridge and Seminary Hills was also discontinued. The 28A portion between Inova Alexandria Hospital and King Street Station became a limited-stop portion, local stops have been replaced by DASH routes AT5 and AT6.

The new Seven Corners Transit Center opened on January 22, 2012 next to Seven Corners Shopping Center. The 28A was rerouted to serve the new transit center to connect with other routes. The schedules of the 28A trips remains unchanged.

As the Silver Line opened at Tysons Corner, the 28A extends from Tysons Corner Center to Tysons Corner station, bringing more bus connections to other routes.

Beginning June 25, 2017, Route 28A westbound trips to Tysons Corner Metrorail Station will not operate via Tysons Corner Center (Towers Crescent Dr, Tysons One Place and Fashion Blvd). Eastbound trips to King Street-Old Town Metrorail Station will continue to operate via Tysons Corner Center.

During the COVID-19 pandemic, the line was reduced to operate on its Saturday supplemental schedule beginning on March 16, 2020. However beginning on March 18, 2020, the line was further reduced to operate on its Sunday schedule. Weekend service was also reduced beginning on March 21, 2020, operating every 30 minutes. Full service was restored beginning on August 23, 2020.

On September 5, 2021, Route 28A underwent significant changes on its route. In the city of Alexandria service along King Street, West Braddock Road and North Howard Street between West Braddock Road and Seminary Road was discontinued. The route was rerouted to Duke Street, North Jordan Street and North Howard Street, (serving limited stops on Duke Street at Alexandria Commons Shopping Center, Early Street and Jordan Street), and serving all stops on North Jordan and North Howard Streets, service along King Street was replaced by DASH Route 31, while service along West Braddock Road and North Howard Street between Seminary Road and West Braddock Road was replaced by DASH Route 36. The route was also significantly rerouted in the city of Falls Church. Service along East Broad Street between Seven Corners and Washington Street was discontinued and rerouted to North Washington Street, Washington Boulevard, Sycamore Street, Roosevelt Street and Wilson Boulevard. A new connection was also established at East Falls Church station.

Due to rising cases of the COVID-19 Omicron variant, the line was reduced to its Saturday service on weekdays. Full weekday service resumed on February 7, 2022.

As part of WMATA's Better Bus Redesign beginning on June 29, 2025, the 28A was renamed into the F20, keeping the same routing.

== Incidents ==
- On June 26, 2018, a tree fell onto a 28A bus along North Beauregard Street damaging the bus. No injuries were reported.
