= Arlington–Union Station Line =

Bus route

13Y
- Arlington–Union Station Line

Overview
- System: Metrobus
- Operator: Washington Metropolitan Area Transit Authority
- Garage: Four Mile Run
- Livery: Local
- Status: Replaced by Route 10N
- Began service: June 26, 1983
- Ended service: June 25, 2017

Route
- Locale: Northwest, Arlington, Virginia, Downtown Washington D.C.
- Communities served: Crystal City, Pentagon City, Downtown Washington D.C.
- Landmarks served: Ronald Reagan Washington National Airport, Crystal City station, Pentagon City station Pentagon station, Federal Triangle station, Federal Triangle, Judiciary Square station, Washington Union Station
- Start: Ronald Reagan Washington National Airport
- Via: 14th Street Bridge, 14th Street, E Street
- End: Washington Union Station

The Arlington–Union Station Line, designated Route 13Y, was a bus route operated by the Washington Metropolitan Area Transit Authority between Ronald Reagan Washington National Airport and Washington Union Station in Northwest DC. The line operated during the weekend early AM hours only between 5:00 AM and 7:00 AM providing riders to National Airport prior to Metro's opening at 7:00 AM. The line was discontinued due to low ridership and replaced by route 10N.

== Background ==
At one point during the 1970s and 1980s, Ronald Reagan Washington National Airport would be served by multiple Metrobus lines primarily the 11 lines. Most of the lines would travel to various points into Northern Virginia or to Downtown Washington D.C. However those routes were later phased out throughout the 1980s to 1990s being simplified or replaced.

== History ==
The line was created as the Pentagon–Washington Line on June 26, 1983 as routes 13A, 13B, 13C, 13D, and 13E in order to provide service between Pentagon and Downtown DC.

Routes 13A and 13B would operate daily except during weekday peak hours between Pentagon station and Federal Triangle via Arlington Memorial Bridge and Arlington Cemetery station. Route 13A would operate in a clockwise direction loop while route 13B would operate in the counter clockwise direction loop. Both routes would operate every 30 minutes.

Routes 13C and 13D would operate during the weekday peak-hours between Pentagon station and Capitol Hill following much of the same path of routes 13A and 13B but would loop along Arlington Memorial Bridge and the 14th Street Bridge. Both routes would operate every 12–15 minutes.

Route 13E would only operate between 7:15 AM to 8:15 AM every 12 minutes between Pentagon and Federal Triangle via the Memorial Bridge.

The new 13 lines replaced most of routes operating between Pentagon station and Downtown Washington DC on the same day.

=== 1990s ===
Throughout the 1990s, more changes were made to the line.

Routes 13C, 13D, and 13E were all discontinued and replaced by routes 13A and 13B. Routes 13A would operate in the clockwise direction via Army Navy Drive, Arlington Memorial Bridge, Constitution Avenue, Federal Triangle, Independence Avenue, and the 14th Street Bridge while 13B would operate the same routing in the counter clockwise direction (opposite direction). These routes are a combined 13C, 13D, and 13E.

Also a new 13F and 13G were introduced to operate between Ronald Reagan Washington National Airport station/Ronald Reagan Washington National Airport and Federal Triangle via Crystal City station and Pentagon station which operates along the 13A, 13B, 13C, 13D, and 13E routing between Pentagon and Downtown DC. The 13G would operate in the clockwise direction (same as 13A) and 13F would operate in the counter clockwise direction (same as 13B) during the weekend early AM hours only between 5:00 AM and 7:00 PM prior to Metro's opening. The line was later renamed the National Airport–Pentagon–Washington Line

=== 2006 Proposed Changes ===
In 2006, WMATA proposed to eliminate all off-peak service for routes 13A and 13B. This was because service was redundant with Metrorail service and low ridership during the off-peak hours. According to WMATA, weekday peak ridership averages 21 passengers per trip versus 5 passengers per trip (65 passengers) during the off-peak. Weekend pre-Metro opening ridership averages 28 passengers on Saturday and 38 on Sundays. After 8:00 AM ridership averages four passengers per trip ( 108 passengers) on Saturday and seven passengers per trip (133 passengers) on Sunday.

=== 2006 Changes ===
On September 24, 2006, off-peak service for routes 13A and 13B were discontinued due low ridership and a redundancy towards Metrorail service. Service would now operate between 5:10 AM to 9:10 AM and 3:00 PM to 6:50 PM weekdays. Routes 13F and 13G would operate between 5:20 AM to 7:15 AM Saturdays, and 5:30 AM to 7:10 AM on Sundays.

=== 2010 Proposed Changes ===
In 2010 during WMATA's FY2011 budget, WMATA proposed to eliminate routes 13A and 13B and replace it with an extended route 16F to Federal Triangle via the 14th Street Bridge and a new route 7Y to Farragut Square via the Arlington Memorial Bridge in later proposals.

Routes 13F and 13G would be retained and still provide early morning weekend service between 5:00 AM and 7:00 AM but could be extended to 8:00 AM if Metro were to change its hours.

=== 2010 Changes ===
On December 19, 2010, routes 13A and 13B were discontinued by WMATA and replaced by a new route 7Y and an extended 16F. Route 7Y would operate via the Arlington Memorial Bridge while route 16F would operate via the 14th Street Bridge replacing the 13A and 13B entirely. Routes 13F and 13G remained unchanged.

=== 2013 Proposed Changes ===
In 2013, WMATA proposed two options to the 13F and 13G.

One option was to discontinue all service and replace it with an extended route 54 (designated 54A) from L'Enfant Plaza station to Ronald Reagan Washington National Airport station via Pentagon station replacing routes 13F and 13G.

The second option was to extend routes 13F and 13G to Washington Union Station via Pentagon City and Crystal City stations. The line would be extended along 7th street (Northbound), 9th street (Southbound), and E street to serve Union station. Service along Arlington Memorial Bridge would be discontinued as the line would be simplified to only operate along the 14th Street Bridge. Service along Independence Avenue and the terminal point along 12th street would also be discontinued.

WMATA reasons the changes in order to provide connections to additional activity areas and transfers to other lines and minimal ridership was reported at Arlington Cemetery station and on Constitution Avenue west of 14th Street.

=== 2014 Changes ===
On March 30, 2014, routes 13F and 13G were discontinued and replaced by a new route 13Y which was also extended to Washington Union Station. The new 13Y would operate along WMATA's Option 2 proposal from 2013 and would only operate during weekend early AM hours similar to routes 13F and 13G. The line was also renamed for the third and final time as the Arlington–Union Station Line as of a result.

=== Proposed Elimination ===
In 2016 during WMATA's FY2018 budget, it was proposed to eliminate route 13Y due to low ridership, to reduce costs, and has a high subsidy per rider. According to performance measure it goes as the following for WMATA:

Performance Measures	Route 13Y	WMATA Guideline	Pass/Fail
Average Daily Riders	60	432	Fail
Cost Recovery	8.42%	16.6%	Fail
Subsidy per Rider	$12.72	$4.81	Fail
Riders per Trip	8.4	10.7	Fail
Riders per Revenue Mile	1.1	1.3	Fail

=== Discontinuation of Route ===
On June 25, 2017, route 13Y was eliminated due to low ridership. A new route 10N of the Alexandria–Pentagon Line was introduced on the same day to operate along the same 13 routing between Ronald Reagan Washington National Airport station and Pentagon station. Service to Washington DC was fully discontinued. The main difference between the 10N and 13Y was the 10N would operate during Friday and Saturday late nights (after midnight) and early morning Sunday service between 6:30 AM and 7:30 AM only.
