= Barcroft–South Fairlington Line =

Bus route in Washington, D.C., United States

22A, 22F
- Barcroft–South Fairlington Line

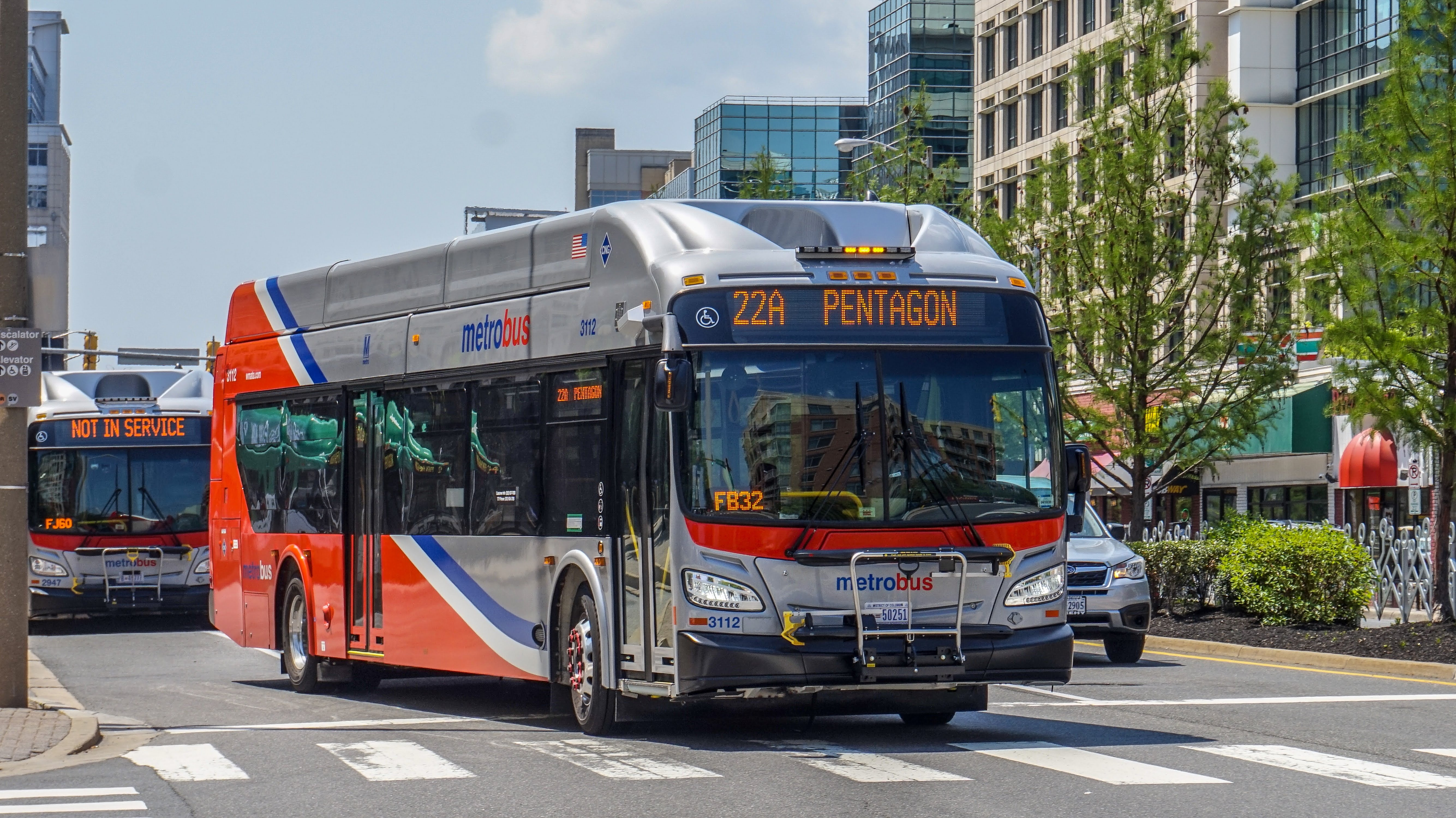
- Route 22A at Ballston–MU Station in Arlington County, Virginia

Overview
- System: Metrobus
- Operator: Washington Metropolitan Area Transit Authority
- Garage: Four Mile Run
- Livery: Local
- Status: Discontinued
- Began service: December 30, 2003
- Ended service: 22B: June 24, 2018 22C: March 13, 2020 22A, 22F: June 29, 2025

Route
- Locale: Arlington County; City of Alexandria; Fairfax County
- Communities served: Ballston, Buckingham, Alcova Heights, Barcroft, Shirlington, Fairlington, Stonegate, Fort Ward, Parkfairfax, Pentagon City
- Landmarks served: Ballston–MU station, Ballston Quarter, Arlington Hall, The Village at Shirlington, Skyline City, NVCC (Alexandria Campus), Bradlee Shopping Center, Pentagon City station, Pentagon station
- Start: Ballston–MU station (22A, 22C); Skyline City (22F)
- Via: North Glebe Road, George Mason Drive, South Four Mile Run Drive, South Arlington Mill Road, Seminary Road (22F), Fillmore Avenue (22F), Braddock Road (22F), Van Dorn Street (22F), Interstate 395
- End: Pentagon station

Service
- Level: Daily
- Frequency: 20-25 minutes (Rush Hour); 30-35 minutes (Midday and Weekday Evening Service); 45 minutes (Saturday); 60-70 minutes (Sunday)
- Operates: 5:30 AM – 10:49 PM (Weekdays); 6:30 AM – 10:19 PM (Saturdays); 7:30 AM – 9:16 PM (Sundays)
- Ridership: 102,147 (22A, FY 2024); 40,031 (22F, FY 2024)
- Transfers: SmarTrip only
- Timetable: Barcroft–South Fairlington Line

The Barcroft–South Fairlington Line, designated as Route 22A, or Route 22F, was a daily bus route operated by the Washington Metropolitan Area Transit Authority between Ballston–MU station of the Orange and Silver lines of the Washington Metro (22A, 22C) or Skyline City (22F) and Pentagon station of the Yellow and Blue lines of the Washington Metro until its discontinuance on June 29, 2025 when it was replaced by the A71.

The 22 Line trips were roughly 20 minutes during peak hours, 30 minutes during off peak, and 60 minutes on weekends. This line provided service to Ballston or Skyline City and the Pentagon Transit Center from the neighborhoods of Arlington County, Fairfax County and Alexandria.

== Route description and service ==
The 22A, 22C, and 22F operated from Four Mile Run Division on various schedules. The 22A only operated during off peak hours and weekends through Pentagon City, while the 22C and 22F only operated during rush hours. The 22C and 22F didn't serve the neighborhood of Parkfairfax nor Pentagon City station, although 22F ran on a one way route, mornings to Pentagon Station and afternoons to Skyline City. The 22A and 22C ran through the neighborhoods of Buckingham, Alcova Park, Barcroft, and Fairlington between terminals. 22F serves the neighborhoods of Stonegate and Fort Ward, before joining the other lines at Fairlington.

== History ==
The line was formerly known for two lines. It was known as "Walker Chapel–Pentagon Line", from 1979 all the way up to December 29, 2003, and "Pentagon–Army-Navy Drive–Shirley Park Line" for the first Route 22B, from December 29, 2003, all the way up to June 28, 2009. The full former line was renamed the "Barcroft–South Fairlington Line".

=== Walker Chapel–Pentagon Line ===
Routes 22A, 22B, 22C, and 22F were the original four routes of the 22 line. Routes 22A and 22B originally served to Seven Corners Transit Center via the Walker Chapel, Williamsburg Boulevard, and East Falls Church station. Some morning westbound trips, and afternoon eastbound trips of the 22B ends at Ballston station. The 22B only operated during peak hours only, while the 22C operates only on middays, following the same route as 22B. Unlike the 22B, the 22C ends at Ballston and does not operate west of the station. Route 22F operated the same way as the 22B, although it ran on a loop around Walker Chapel, leading to stop at Ballston Station twice. The 22F goes to Pentagon Station in morning peak hours, while it goes to Ballston in afternoons.

In 2003, Arlington Transit began to absorb the northern segment of the 22 line, leading to make plans to modify or discontinue the route. On December 29, 2003, it was finalized that WMATA discontinued the 22C and 22F from the line. The 22B was renamed as the "Pentagon–Army-Navy Drive–Shirley Park Line", discontinuing service west of Shirley Park. The 22A become the "Barcroft–South Fairlington Line", discontinuing service west of Ballston station. The remaining route which is on Walker Chapel, Williamsburg Boulevard, and East Falls Church station is operated by Arlington Transit Route 53.

=== Pentagon–Army-Navy Drive–Shirley Park Line ===
After the Walker Chapel–Pentagon Line was split into three different lines, WMATA kept the 22B, by serving through Shirley Park, and Army Navy Drive. The route was truncated and terminates at Shirley Park, located at South Meade Street and 28th Street South in Arlington County, near Gunston Middle School. The 22B began its route at Shirley Park, serving through the neighborhood of Avalon Bay to Pentagon Metro. The 22B also serves Pentagon City, but does not serve the Pentagon City Metro. Unlike the 22A, which is on a different line, the 22B only transfers to Route 22A at Pentagon Station. On December 30, 2007, WMATA announced the Saturday Service for route 22B, after the 22A began Saturday Service in 2006. On June 29, 2009, WMATA discontinued the Pentagon–Army-Navy Drive–Shirley Park Line, after Arlington Transit announced Route 87 that will serve the same spots as the 22B. With ART's service changes, the line is renamed as "Pentagon Metro-Army Navy Drive-Shirlington", as route 87 extended to Shirlington.

== Service changes ==
Starting on December 2, 2006, WMATA added Saturday service on the 22A. This change brought more service to Ballston and Shirlington in the weekends. In 2008, Shirlington opened the Shirlington Bus Station (or Shirlington Transit Center), making the 22A being one of the bus routes to serve as a transfer point. This new bus station discontinued the old intersection bus stop which is located at South Quincy Street and 28th Street South (now Campbell Avenue).

On June 17, 2012, WMATA added more peak service between the neighborhood of Barcroft and Ballston Station. This additional service lead to the reincarnation of route 22B. The 22B ran as a loop around the neighborhood of Barcroft via South George Mason Drive, and ended at the intersection of South Four Mile Run Drive, and Columbia Pike, where the former 16Y ended.

On June 21, 2015, WMATA added Sunday service to the 22A. This route evolved from weekday service to daily service. Alongside with these changes, the 22 line added more service through the neighborhood of Parkfairfax in Alexandria, Virginia, and the Alexandria Campus of Northern Virginia Community College. By the addition of this service, it led to the elimination of routes 25A, 25C, 25D, & 25E from the Ballston–Bradlee–Pentagon Line. The service changes also added more service, by bringing back routes 22C & 22F. The 22A reduced service, by operating only on off peak hours and weekends. As a result, the 22A route replaced the 25E route. The 22C follows the same route as the 22A, but only operated during peak hours, and didn't serve Parkfairfax. As a result, the 22C route replaced the 25A route. The 22F route was the only route in the line, that didn't serve north of Fairlington. The 22F served on an hourly peak schedule, morning rush hours to Pentagon Station, and afternoon rush hours to Northern Virginia Community College Alexandria. The 22F didn't serve Shirlington Station, where the 25D served, nor Parkfairfax. As a result, the 22F replaced the 25C and 25D.

On June 24, 2018, WMATA eliminated Route 22B, leaving 22A, 22C, and 22F as the remaining routes of the line. In addition, the 22A began to operate via Pentagon City before heading to Pentagon Station. This brought more bus service to Pentagon City as routes 16G and 16H from the Columbia Pike–Pentagon City Line and Arlington Transit routes 42, 74, 84 and 87 also served the station at this time. On December 17, 2018, Arlington Transit began to add route 72 to bring more service between Ballston and Shirlington. ART route 72 absorbed the remaining portion of WMATA's route 22B and reinstated service on N. Glebe Rd, north of Old Dominion Drive, which was part of the Walker Chapel–Pentagon Line in the 1980s.

=== Pandemic ===
In response to the COVID-19 pandemic, the line was reduced to operate on its Saturday Supplemental Schedule with the 22C being suspended. However the line began operating on its Sunday service on March 18, 2020, with the 22F being suspended. Weekend service was also suspended beginning on March 21, 2020.

As part of WMATA's proposed Fiscal Year 2021 budget, route 22A and 22C would be discontinued and replaced by route 22F and ART route 72. Route 22A was suffering from low ridership and 22C was a redundant route to the 22F and ART route 72 between Shirlington and Ballston. However WMATA later backed out the elimination of the 22A and the 22C on April 2, 2020.

Beginning on June 28, 2020, route 22A operated only between Pentagon station and Shirlington Transit Center. Service between the transit center and Ballston–MU Station was suspended during the weekdays with all service ending at 6:30 PM with no service between 11:00 AM and 1:30 PM. The next day on June 29, 2020, Arlington Transit announced ART route 72 would restart service operating on a modified weekday schedule. This provided service between Shirlington Transit Center and Ballston–MU Station where 22A service had been cut.

As part of the WMATA's COVID-19 Recovery Plan, service on the 22A and 22F was mostly restored on August 23, 2020 with service on the 22A to Ballston–MU Station also seeing restoration. Route 22C never returned to service.

On September 10, 2020, as part of its Fiscal Year 2022 proposed budget, WMATA proposed to reduce frequency on routes 22A, 22C, and 22F service in order to reduce costs and low federal funds. However, many WMATA budget proposals planned that all 22A and 22C service was to be taken over by Arlington Transit.

On June 6, 2021, all Route 22F service was extended to operate to Skyline City, partially replacing the suspended Route 28F and 28G.

Due to rising cases of the Omicron variant, beginning on January 10, 2022, route 22A was reduced to its Saturday service on weekdays and all 22F service was suspended. Full weekday service resumed on February 7, 2022.

=== Better Bus Network ===
As part of WMATA's Better Bus Redesign beginning on June 29, 2025, the line was changed completely. The 22A was changed to operate between Ballston–MU station and Shirlington Transit Center, then was changed to operate inside South Farrington and operate along King Street to King Street–Old Town station, being renamed into the A71. The 22F was also changed to serve Culmore to partially replace the 16C and 16E as the new A66. Service between Pentagon and Shirlington, Plus Shirlington and South Farrington was replaced by the A25 and A66.
