= Hunting Towers–Potomac Yard–Crystal City Line =

9B, 11P
- Hunting Towers–Potomac Yard–Crystal City Line

Overview
- System: Metrobus
- Operator: Washington Metropolitan Area Transit Authority
- Status: Replaced by DASH AT10
- Began service: 11P: March 12, 2001; 9B: June 26, 2005
- Ended service: 11P: September 25, 2004; 9B: June 25, 2006

Route
- Locale: Arlington County, City of Alexandria
- Communities served: Crystal City, Potomac Yard, Old Town Alexandria, Huntington
- Landmarks served: Crystal City station, Potomac Yard Center
- Start: Hunting Towers
- Via: Crystal Drive, Clark Street, Jefferson Davis Highway, Washington Street
- End: Crystal City station

The Hunting Towers–Potomac Yard–Crystal City Line, designated as Route 11P, or Route 9B, was a bus route that was operated by the Washington Metropolitan Area Transit Authority between Hunting Towers in Huntington, Virginia, and Crystal City station of the Yellow and Blue lines of the Washington Metro. This line provides service from Hunting Towers in the City of City of Alexandria to Crystal City in Arlington County. Trips are roughly 25 minutes between intervals.

== History ==
The Hunting Towers–Potomac Yard–Crystal City Line was used two times throughout the years, although both the 11P and 9B have its original lines.

=== Route 11P ===
Route 11P was part of the Mount Vernon Line, along with Routes 11H and 11X since 1987. The 11P operates through the neighborhood of Mount Vernon in Fairfax County. In the mid-1990s, route 11P was later part of the Alexandria-National Airport Line The 11P operates between Hunting Towers and Crystal City, via National Airport during weekday rush hours. Route 11P was later transferred to Hunting Towers–Potomac Yard–Crystal City Line on March 12, 2001. The 11P was rerouted to serve Potomac Yard Center via Jefferson Davis Highway (now Richmond Highway), but no longer operates through Ronald Reagan Washington National Airport. The 11P began operating on full weekday service following these changes. The route remains unchanged until September 26, 2004, when route 11P and route 9B merged into a single route, and being transferred to the Richmond Highway Line.

=== Route 9B ===
Route 9B was once part of the Fort Belvoir Line, which operated along with Route 9A, 9C, and 9D. In the early 2000s, the line was renamed as the Richmond Highway Line, along with the introduction of route 9E. At some point in mid-2005, the line was renamed as Huntington-Potomac Yard-Pentagon Line. The 9B follows the same schedule as the former 11P, operating during weekdays. On June 26, 2005, route 9B splits from the Huntington-Potomac Yard-Pentagon Line to be renamed as the Hunting Towers–Potomac Yard–Crystal City Line. Following these changes, the name of the line was brought back in service, as the 9B being the sole route of the Line.

=== March 2001 changes ===
On March 12, 2001, the 11P was rerouted to operate via Potomac Yard Center. Service to National Airport was discontinued. The 11P also started to operate during weekday off-peak hours.

=== September 2004 changes ===
On September 26, 2004, the 11P was renamed to route 9B, and is transferred to the Richmond Highway Line. The line is discontinued following the merger of the 11P and the 9B. The schedules of the bus remains the same.

=== June 2005 changes ===
On June 26, 2005, the 9B splits from the Huntington-Potomac Yard-Pentagon Line, bringing back the Hunting Towers–Potomac Yard–Crystal City Line in service. No schedule changes occurred in the 9B.

=== Discontinuation of service ===
On June 25, 2006, route 9B was discontinued, to clear up bus bunching in the Huntington-Pentagon Line (routes 9A and 9E). A new route from Alexandria's DASH, introduced route AT10 on the same day. The DASH AT10 route serves as an alternate travel of the 9B in the city of Alexandria, while routes 9A and 9E continues to serve on Jefferson Davis Highway, and routes 23A and 23C of the McLean–Crystal City Line serves through Crystal City. Route 9S is also one of the travel alternatives that runs on a loop between Crystal City and Potomac Yard.
