= Pershing Drive–Arlington Boulevard Line =

Bus route in the Washington Metropolitan Area

F62
- Pershing Drive–Arlington Boulevard Line

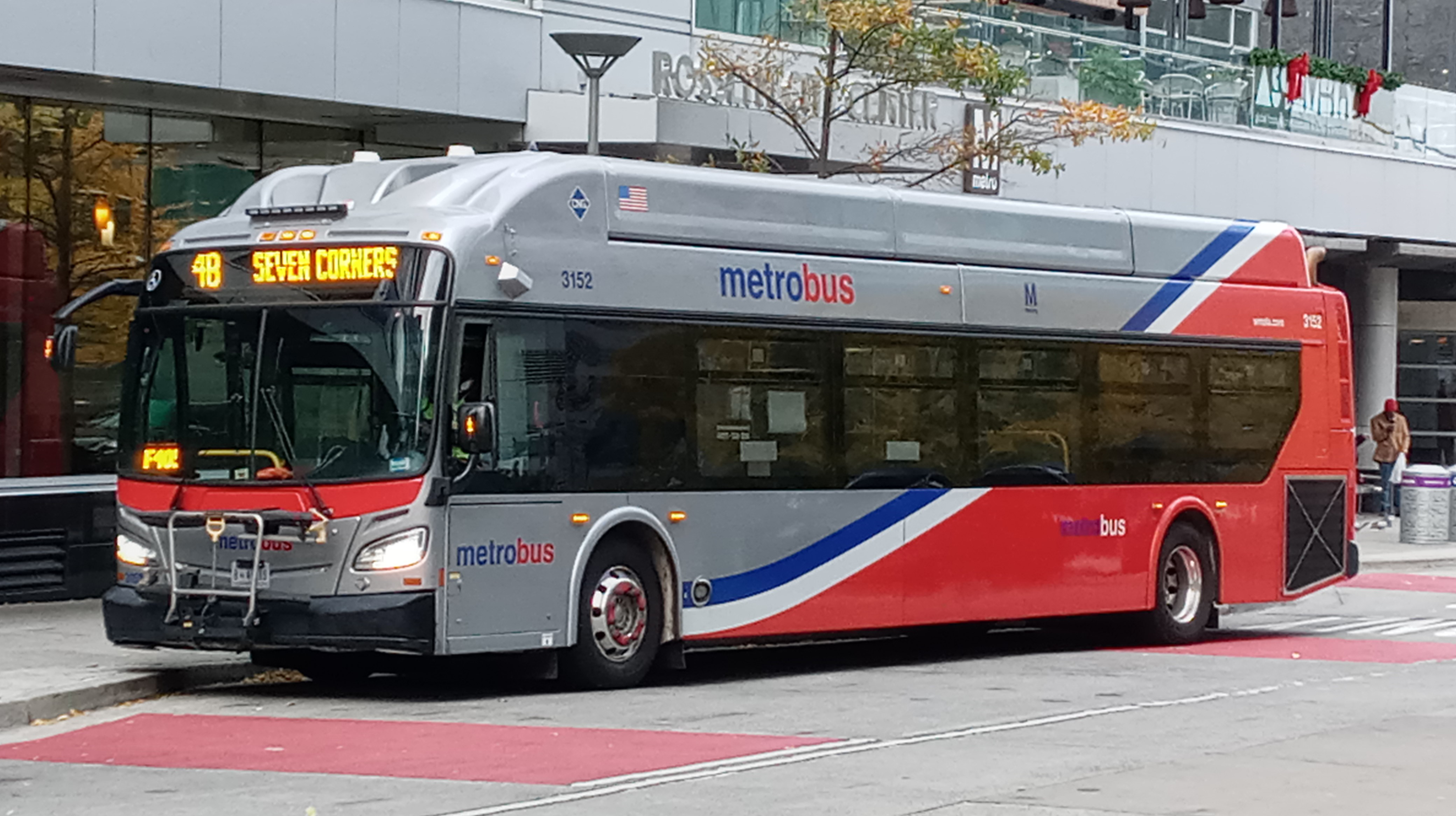
- Former Route 4B at Rosslyn station in 2023

Overview
- System: Metrobus
- Operator: Washington Metropolitan Area Transit Authority
- Garage: Four Mile Run
- Livery: Local
- Status: In Service
- Began service: 1926
- Ended service: 4S: September 24, 2006; 4E and 4H: December 29, 2013; 4A: September 5, 2021; 4B: June 29, 2025

Route
- Locale: Fairfax County; Arlington County
- Communities served: Dunn Loring, Merrifield, West Falls Church, Seven Corners, Arlington Forest, Buckingham, Lyon Park, Courthouse, Rosslyn
- Landmarks served: Dunn Loring station, Seven Corners Transit Center, Court House station, Rosslyn station
- Start: Dunn Loring station
- Via: Arlington Boulevard, North Pershing Drive
- End: Rosslyn station

Service
- Level: Daily
- Frequency: 15 minutes (Rush Hour); 30 minutes (Midday Service); 45 minutes (Daily Evening Service); 45 minutes (Saturday); 60 minutes (Sunday)
- Operates: 5:05 AM – 12:44 AM (Weekdays); 6:20 AM – 11:31 PM (Saturdays); 6:35 AM – 9:44 PM (Sundays)
- Ridership: 298,461 (FY 2025)
- Transfers: SmarTrip only
- Timetable: Pershing Drive–Arlington Boulevard Line

The Pershing Drive–Arlington Boulevard Line, designated as Route F62, is a daily bus route operated by the Washington Metropolitan Area Transit Authority between Dunn Loring station of the Orange Line of the Washington Metro and Rosslyn station of the Orange, Blue, and Silver lines of the Washington Metro. This line provides service within the neighborhoods of Dunn Loring, Merrifield, West Falls Church, Seven Corners, Arlington Forest, Lyon Park and Rosslyn in Fairfax and Arlington counties. Alongside the neighborhoods, it also brings service through the marketplace, businesses, and offices within the counties.

== Route description and service ==
The F62 operates from Four Mile Run Division on various schedules. The F62 runs daily through the neighborhoods in Fairfax and Arlington County, with weekend trips alternating between Dunn Loring station and Seven Corners Transit Center.

== History ==
The Pershing Drive–Arlington Boulevard Line was introduced in 1926, as the route was part of the Washington Virginia & Maryland Coach Company. It was later operated by WMATA in 1973, when it acquired all routes from the WV&M. From 1973 to 2025, the Pershing Drive–Arlington Boulevard Line consists of all 4 line. The 4 line provides reliable service within Fairfax and Arlington counties to connect from neighborhoods, to marketplaces, to landmarks, and to business. The Pershing Drive–Arlington Boulevard Line is a unique line, in which it retains its original name, without changing its name during service changes, despite that it ran under the Arlington Boulevard Line when it was operated by the WV&M.

After WMATA acquired the 4 line in 1973, the 4 line have its former terminus throughout the years. The 4A once operated between Rosslyn Metro and Culmore vía Arlington Boulevard. The 4B operated once to Jefferson Village (now West Falls Church), a neighborhood in Fairfax County. There were also routes 4E, 4H, and 4S which were part of the line alongside routes 4A and 4B. Routes 4E, 4H, and 4S all operate up to Rosslyn station alongside the 4A and 4B, however, the 4E starts from the neighborhood of Arlington Forest, the 4H from Seven Corners, and the 4S from Sleepy Hollow Road in Fairfax County. The 4A operates during weekdays, while the 4B ran daily, the 4E runs on a one way route during morning rush hours, the 4H runs during late night and Saturdays, and the 4S runs during rush hours, morning peak to Rosslyn and afternoon peak to the neighborhood of Sleepy Hollow.

On January 4, 1981, the 4B was truncated from Jefferson Village to Seven Corners.

On September 24, 2006, route 4S was replaced by the 4H, no longer operating to Sleepy Hollow. These changes brings in more service for the 4H, operating during rush hours where the 4S usually runs. The 4H retains its original intervals following these changes.

The new Seven Corners Transit Center opened on January 22, 2012 next to Seven Corners Shopping Center. The 4A, 4B, and 4H was rerouted to serve the new transit center to connect with other routes. The schedules of these trips remains unchanged, however, the 4B and the 4H will no longer alternate terminals at Leesburg Pike.

In 2013, WMATA proposed to restructure the 4A, 4B, 4E, and 4H. Route 4A was to discontinue all service between Culmore and Seven Corners Transit Center. Service will be provided by the 26A, as it operates via Leesburg Pike. It was also to reduce travel times to Rosslyn station, as riders can transfer via East Falls Church station, where the 26A will operate. Route 4E was proposed to be converted to the 4B, to reduce redundancy to the 4B during morning peak hours. Route 4H was proposed to be converted to the 4A, to reduce redundancy to the 4A during peak hours. The 4A will be designated to operate via Arlington Boulevard, and the 4B to operate via North Pershing Drive.

The reason why WMATA planned these changes was to reduce low ridership on the segment between Culmore and Seven Corners, and to clear bus bunching in the line. These changes was also to improve on-time performance of the route.

On December 29, 2013, major changes occurred in the 4 line. The 4H was discontinued and is replaced by the 4A, and the 4E was converted into 4B trips. These changes was made to clear up bus bunching, as the 4E have the same stops as the 4B, and the 4H have the same stops as the 4A. Alongside with these changes, the 4A was truncated to Seven Corners. Alternate service to Culmore via Leesburg Pike was replaced by the Annandale–East Falls Church Line (route 26A). The 4A have Saturday service following the discontinuation of the 4H.

On June 26, 2016, Saturday service of the 4A is eliminated, making the route a weekdays only route. The 4B remains unchanged, but now operates every 45 minutes on Saturday.

In 2018, WMATA proposed to eliminate all 4A service outside of rush-hours due to low ridership, while increasing all Route 4B service to every 30 minutes.

On June 24, 2018, the 4A midday service was eliminated, having the route to operate only during rush hours. All off-peak trips is now operated by route 4B. The short morning rush hour 4B trips is now extended from Arlington Forest to Seven Corners Transit Center, to improve ridership in the 4B. The bus frequency of the 4B was increased, from 60 minutes to 30 minutes on middays, and 75 minutes to 60 minutes on Sundays.

During the COVID-19 pandemic, all service was reduced to operate on its Saturday supplemental schedule beginning on March 16, 2020. However beginning on March 18, 2020, the line was further reduced to operate on its Sunday schedule, with Route 4A being suspended. Service on weekends were also suspended. On August 23, 2020, Route 4B service was increased, and weekend service was restored, but Route 4A remained suspended.

On September 10, 2020 as part of its FY2022 proposed budget, WMATA proposed to eliminate route 4A service in order to reduce costs and low federal funds. WMATA also proposed to reduce weekend frequency on route 4B.

On September 5, 2021, the 4A was officially discontinued, having not run since March 2020.

Due to rising cases of the COVID-19 Omicron variant, the service was reduced to its Saturday service on weekdays. Full weekday service resumed on February 7, 2022.

As part of WMATA's Better Bus Redesign taking place on June 29, 2025, Route 4B routing remained almost the same between Rosslyn and Seven Corners Transit Center, then follows a modified Route 1B routing between Seven Corners Transit Center and Dunn Loring via Arlington Boulevard and Merrilee Drive and renamed into the F62.
