= Culmore, Virginia =

Unincorporated community in Virginia, United States

- Unincorporated community
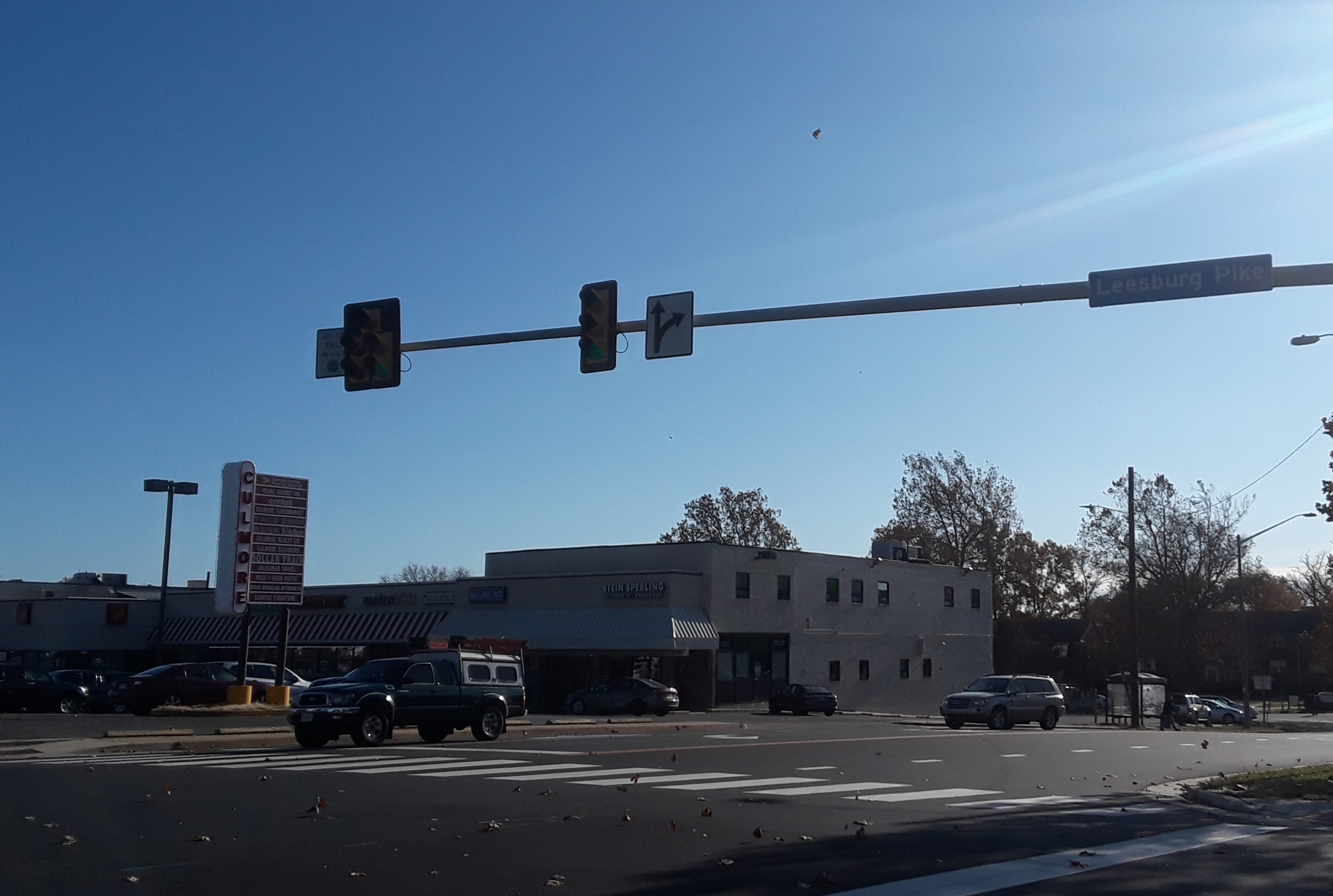
- Culmore Shopping Center in November 2019

- Location within Northern Virginia Location within Virginia Location within the United States
- Coordinates: 38°51′21″N 077°08′24″W
- Country: United States
- State: Virginia
- County: Fairfax
- Time zone: UTC−5 (Eastern (EST))
  - Summer (DST): UTC−4 (EDT)

Culmore is a small commercial center in Fairfax County, Virginia, United States. It sits between Seven Corners and the Skyline area on State Route 7.

== Overview ==
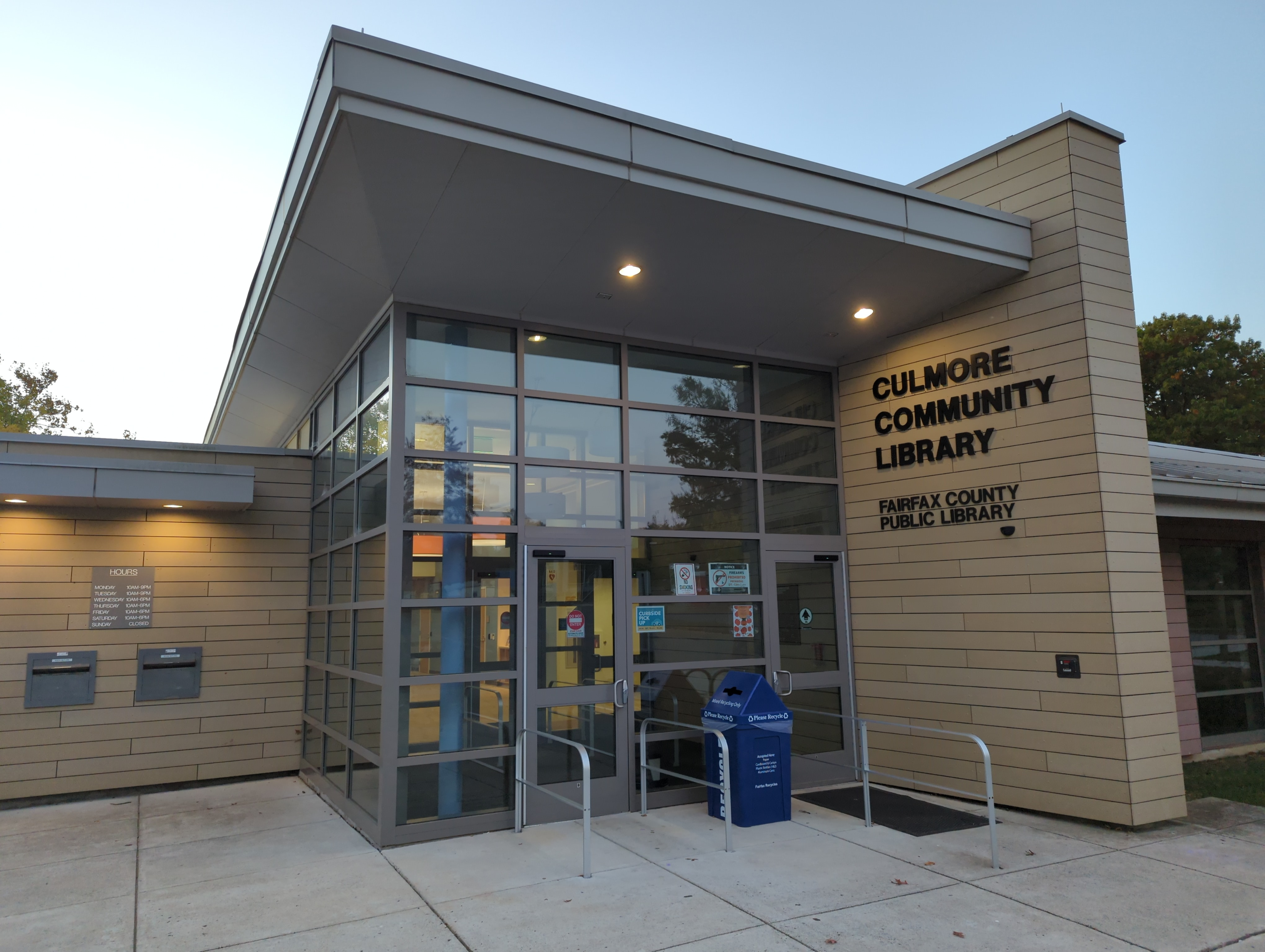
Culmore Community Library

A part of a larger, unincorporated area known as Bailey's Crossroads, Culmore derives its name from the Culmore Shopping Center which comprises the heart of the area. The center is located on the south side of Route 7, or Leesburg Pike, and is situated within the loop formed by Route 7, Glen Carlyn Road, Argyle Drive, and Glen Carlyn Drive.

Culmore Shopping Center contains the Peking Gourmet Inn restaurant, in which President George H. W. Bush once dined.

Culmore has in recent decades become a place name describing both the shopping center and adjacent buildings, including St. Anthony of Padua Roman Catholic Church and a large group of garden-style apartment homes which are located behind the shopping center. The area is almost entirely inhabited by people of Hispanic, particularly Central American, ancestry.

Bailey's Crossroads, in which Culmore Shopping Center is situated, is served by the post office in Falls Church and all homes and businesses in the area bear Falls Church postal addresses. Bailey's Crossroads has no local government and falls within the Mason District of the Fairfax County government.

During the Civil War, the Culmore area was the scene of sharpshooting, fighting and repeated skirmishes, particularly during the opening phase of the war when Confederate troops occupied Munson's Hill and Upton's Hill and Culmore formed a "no man's land" between the opposing forces, with Union soldiers encamped to the east.
