= Pentagon station =

Washington Metro station in Virginia, US

Pentagon
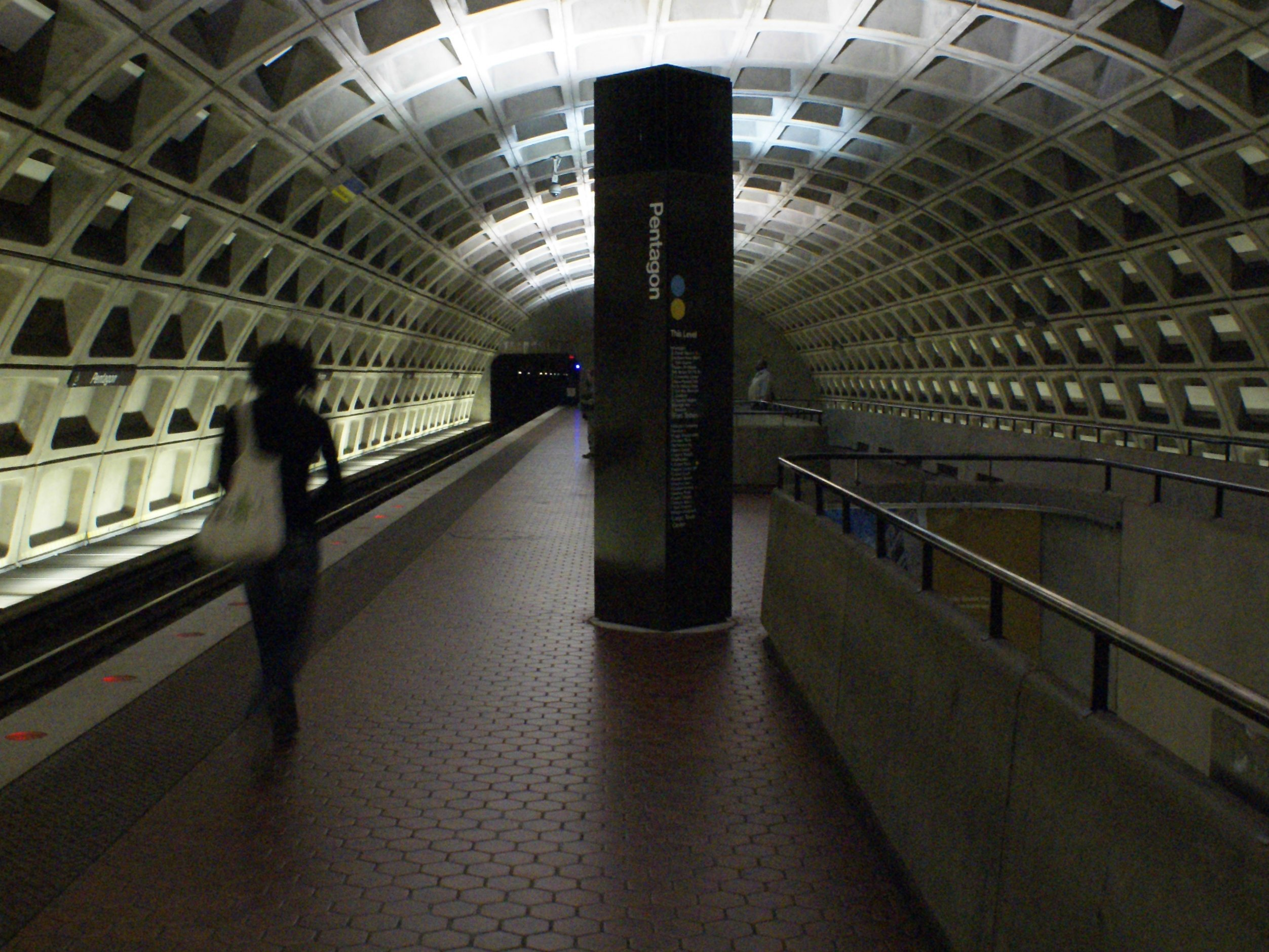
- Pentagon station upper level platform in February 2009

General information
- Location: 2 South Rotary Road; Arlington, Virginia
- Coordinates: 38°52′09″N 77°03′14″W
- Owner: Washington Metropolitan Area Transit Authority
- Platforms: 2 split side platforms
- Tracks: 1 on each level
- Train operators: Washington Metro
- Bus stands: Upper: 1 to 13, Lower: 1 to 11
- Bus operators: ART 42 & 87

Construction
- Structure type: Metro station: Underground; Bus stands: Underground/At-grade
- Platform levels: 2
- Cycle facilities: 6 racks
- Accessible: Yes

Other information
- Station code: C07

History
- Opened: July 1, 1977; 49 years ago
- Rebuilt: 2002

Passengers
- 2025: 10,129 (average weekday)
- Rank: 11 of 98

Services
Preceding station	Washington Metro	Following station
Pentagon City toward Huntington	Yellow Line	L'Enfant Plaza toward Mount Vernon Square or Greenbelt
Pentagon City toward Franconia–Springfield	Blue Line	Arlington Cemetery toward Downtown Largo
Route map
Location

Pentagon station is a split platform station on the Washington Metro located adjacent to the Pentagon in Arlington County, Virginia, United States. The station was opened on July 1, 1977, and is operated by the Washington Metropolitan Area Transit Authority. Providing service for both the Blue and Yellow Lines, the station is where the two lines diverge and thus acts as a transfer point. Northbound, both lines rise above ground, with the Blue Line serving the Arlington Cemetery station, and the Yellow Line crossing the Potomac River into the District of Columbia.

The station opened on July 1, 1977 with the completion of 11.8 miles (19.0 km) of rail between National Airport and RFK Stadium.

Photography is not allowed anywhere inside the station or on station grounds.

== Bus service ==
Pentagon station is also a major bus hub in northern Virginia. The current bus facility opened in 2001 as part of the Pentagon Renovation Program.

- Arlington Transit: 42, 87, 87A, 87P, 87X
- DASH: 35, 103, 104
- Fairfax Connector: 306, 393, 394, 395, 396, 598, 599, 698, 834, 835
- Metrobus: A11, A25, A27, A28, A66, A90, F28, F29, F44, F81, F83, F85
- Loudoun County Transit: 282, 482, 682, 882
- PRTC OmniRide: 543, 602, 612, 942, D-100, D-200, D-300, L-100, L-200, MC-100, MC-200, RS

== Station layout ==
The station is located underground, adjacent to the Pentagon, and formerly had a direct (but secure) entrance to the Pentagon and its underground shopping center. This entrance was closed in 2001 as part of the Pentagon Renovation Program. Access to the Pentagon is now gained via a new secured entrance facility above ground near the bus depot and the entrances to the subway station. The new exit features signage displayed at Gallery Place-Chinatown and newer stations.

Pentagon is one of two stations (the other being the Rosslyn station) at which trains going one direction are boarded on a different station level than trains going the other direction, as a way to prevent an at-grade crossing. This is because the Blue and Yellow lines split apart an extremely short distance from the station.

An indicator sign at the north end of the station flashes to inform passengers of the arriving train's destination, showing Blue for Downtown Largo and Yellow for Greenbelt. This feature is only used at final transfer stations; another example being L'Enfant Plaza.

South of the station, two empty tunnels diverge from the tracks towards Columbia Pike for future extension, but the plans were later dropped.

S	Upper level	Pentagon, Pentagon Memorial, upper level bus bays
1	Lower level	Lower level bus bays
M	Mezzanine	Fare gates, ticket machines, station manager
M	Side platform
M	Northbound	toward Greenbelt (L'Enfant Plaza) → toward Downtown Largo (Arlington Cemetery) →
T	Southbound	← toward Huntington (Pentagon City) ← toward Franconia–Springfield (Pentagon City)
T	Side platform

== Incidents ==
=== 2010 ===
On March 4, 2010, a gunman, identified as John Patrick Bedell, who espoused anti-government views, shot and wounded two Pentagon police officers at a security checkpoint in the Pentagon station. The officers returned fire, striking him in the head. Bedell died the next day, on March 5, 2010.

=== 2021 ===
At 10:40 a.m. EST, on August 3, 2021, a stabbing occurred, killing officer George Gonzalez and leading to a lockdown of the Pentagon that was later lifted. The perpetrator, 27-year-old Austin William Lanz, shot and killed himself using Gonzalez's service weapon. In an apology issued by Lanz's family, they stated that in his final few months, he suffered from "many mental health challenges". There was a warrant out for Lanz's arrest due to an incident months earlier, in which Lanz broke into a Georgia home with a crowbar.

== Notable places nearby ==
- Pentagon Memorial
- United States Air Force Memorial
