= Washington Boulevard (Arlington) =

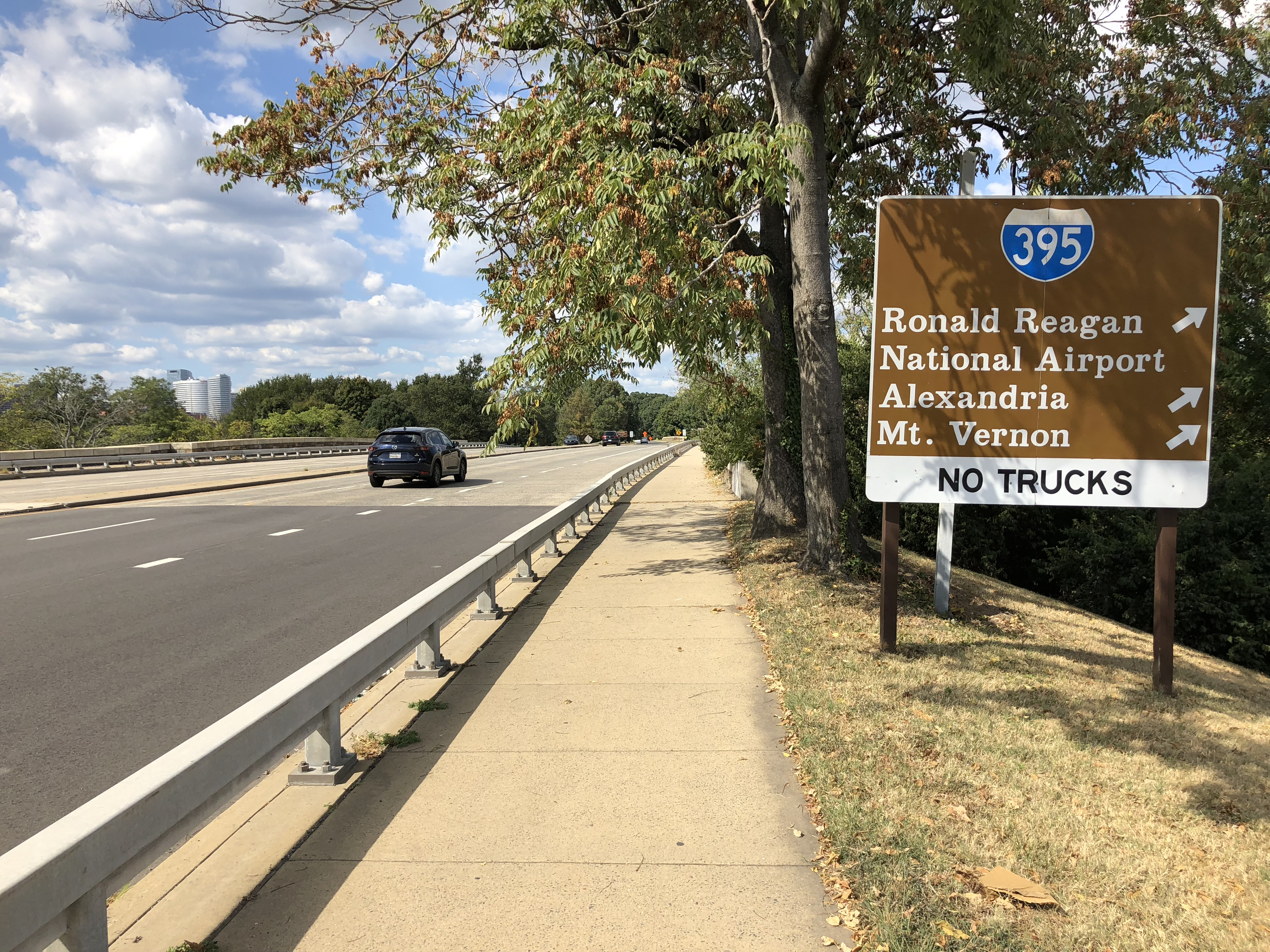
- Looking northeast at the George Washington Parkway interchange on Columbia Island
- Maintained by: VDOT, Arlington County, and NPS
- Length: 7.9 mi (12.7 km)
- Component highways: SR 237 from East Falls Church, VA to Ballston, VA; SR 27 from Penrose, VA to Columbia Island, DC
- West end: US 29 in East Falls Church, VA
- Major junctions: SR 120 in Ballston, VA; US 50 in Penrose, VA; I-395 in Pentagon City, VA; SR 110 at The Pentagon, VA; George Washington Parkway on Columbia Island, DC
- East end: Arlington Memorial Bridge on Columbia Island, DC

Washington Boulevard is a major arterial road in Arlington County, Virginia and Washington, DC. The western portion is designated State Route 237 (SR 237), the eastern portion is State Route 27 (SR 27) and the center is an arterial road with no designation. A short portion of the road enters the District of Columbia on Columbia Island, providing a connection between SR 27 and the Arlington Memorial Bridge.

== Route description ==
=== West of the Pentagon ===
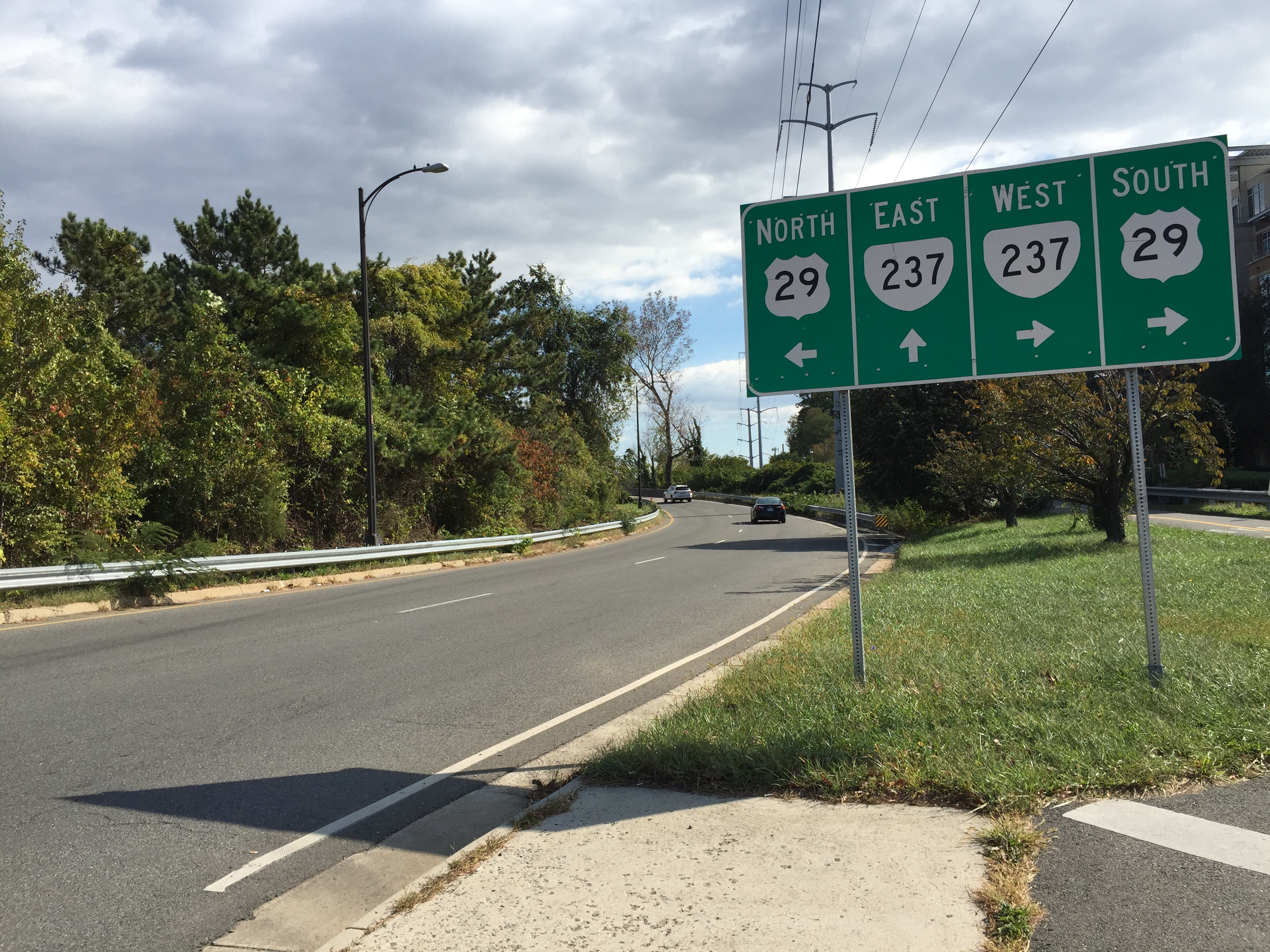
One-way traffic heading westbound approaching the Lee Highway intersection

Washington Boulevard begins as a one-way residential street heading westbound in East Falls Church, parallel to Interstate 66 (Custis Memorial Parkway). It provides a ramp to I-66 west as part of the highway's exit 69. At an intersection with Lee Highway (U.S. Route 29 and State Route 237), SR 237 transitions to Washington Boulevard and Fairfax Drive (the eastbound road in the one-way pair on the other side of I-66. Shortly east of this intersection, the two roads merge and Washington Boulevard continues as two-way undivided road. An intersection with Sycamore Street provides access to the East Falls Church Washington Metro station, which serves the Orange and Silver Lines.

Continuing east in Arlington County, Washington Boulevard intersects Glebe Road (State Route 120) as it enters Ballston. Here, SR 237 turns south onto Glebe Road. Glebe Road also provides access to I-66 east at exit 71, just north of Washington Boulevard. The boulevard now continues east without a signed route number, passing through the Virginia Square and Clarendon neighborhoods. In downtown Clarendon, the road intersects the one-way pair of Wilson Boulevard and Clarendon Boulevard. It also intersects SR 237 once again, this time at 10th Street North.

Beyond 10th Street, Washington Boulevard takes a more southern direction and enters the Lyon Park neighborhood. At a cloverleaf interchange with Arlington Boulevard (U.S. Route 50), Washington Boulevard picks up the designation for State Route 27, an east–west route despite the boulevard's current north–south trajectory. The entirety of SR 27 is a limited access road, with access to and from the road via only ramps and no intersections or traffic signals. An interchange with Second Street South provides to the Penrose neighborhood as well as the historic Fort Myer, now part of Joint Base Myer–Henderson Hall. Washington Boulevard also crosses the Columbia Pike (State Route 244) by way of the Freedmans Village Bridge. The road then takes a more east–west trajectory as it approaches the Mixing Bowl.

=== Mixing Bowl ===
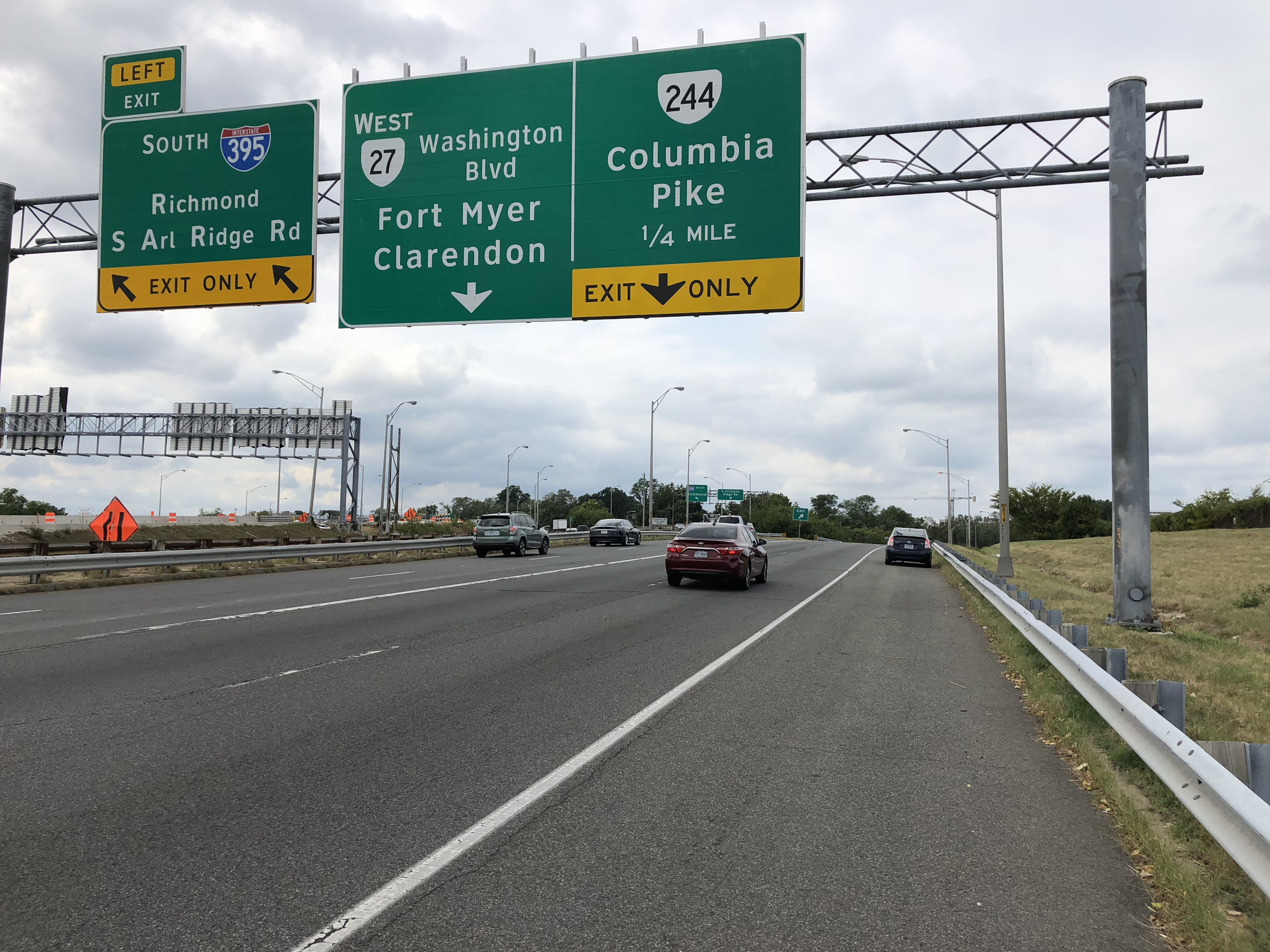
Westbound Washington Boulevard at the Mixing Bowl

The Mixing Bowl interchange connects Washington Boulevard with Interstate 395, the Shirley Highway. Eastbound Washington Boulevard can access both directions of I-395, while westbound traffic can only access I-395 south and the highway's reversible HOV lanes. The Mixing Bowl also has ramps to and from Arlington Ridge Road and Army Navy Drive, providing access to Pentagon City.

East of the interchange, Washington Boulevard turns north, meeting the eastern terminus of SR 244 at a partial cloverleaf interchange which also serves the south parking lot of The Pentagon, the Pentagon Memorial, and the United States Air Force Memorial. The boulevard continues north, serving as the eastern border of Arlington National Cemetery, before meeting State Route 110 (Richmond Highway) and the Pentagon North Parking lot at two nearby interchanges. The southbound (SR 27 westbound) exit to SR 110 south is signed as "TO I-395 north." North of here, Washington Boulevard crosses the Boundary Channel and enters the District of Columbia.

=== District of Columbia ===
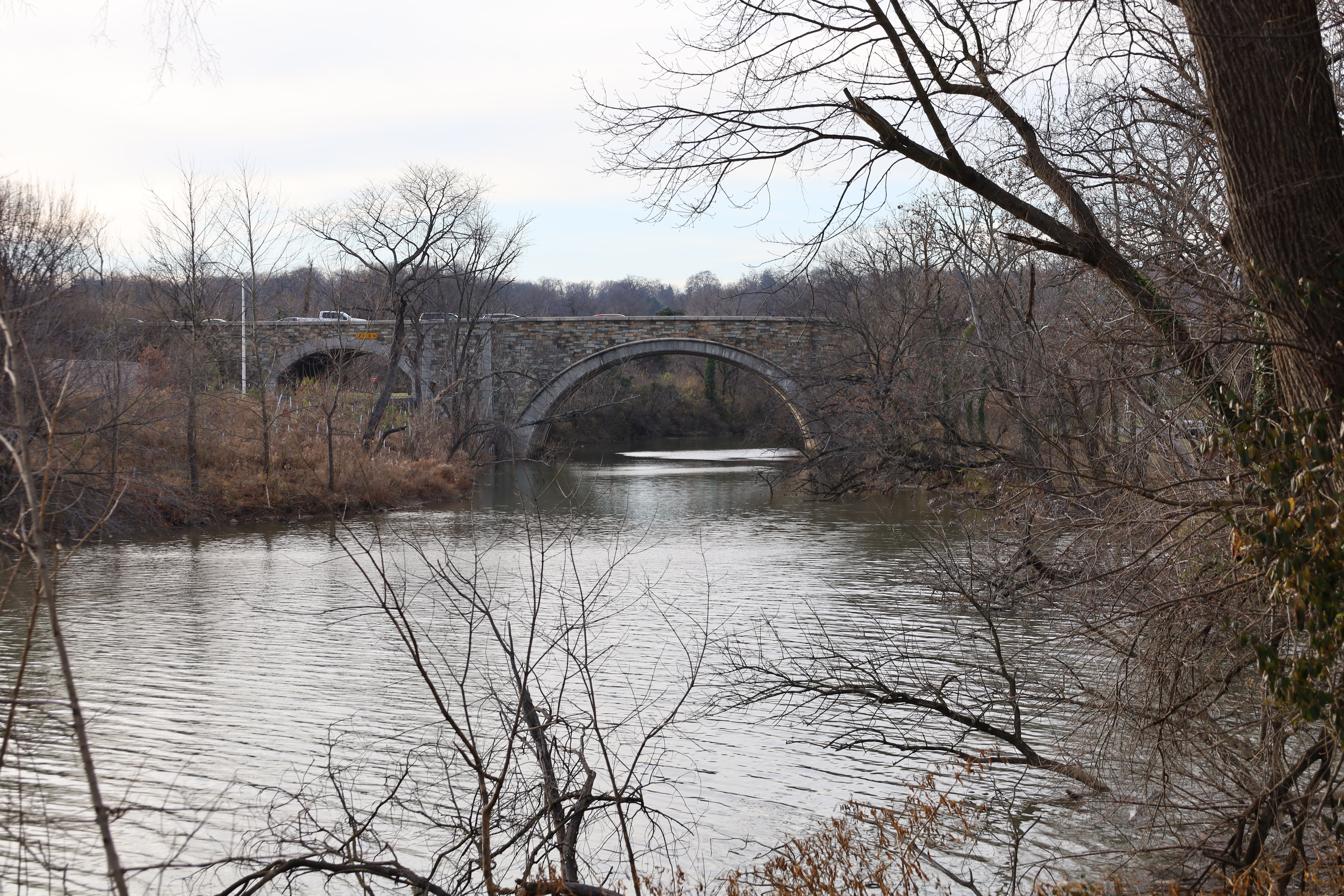
Crossing of Boundary Channel in 2020

Washington Boulevard exists for just 0.4 miles (0.64 km) within the District, and road signage is scarce. The road travels north on Columbia Island, a National Park Service-maintained island within the District of Columbia despite it being located west of the Potomac River. The road has an interchange with the George Washington Memorial Parkway, with both directions of Washington Boulevard accessing the southbound parkway and the northbound parkway accessing the northbound boulevard. Just before the eastern terminus, the boulevard has an exit ramp that travels underneath the Arlington Memorial Bridge bound for the northbound parkway and US 50 west, before coming to an end at Arlington Memorial Circle, which accesses both the Memorial Bridge and Arlington National Cemetery.

== History ==
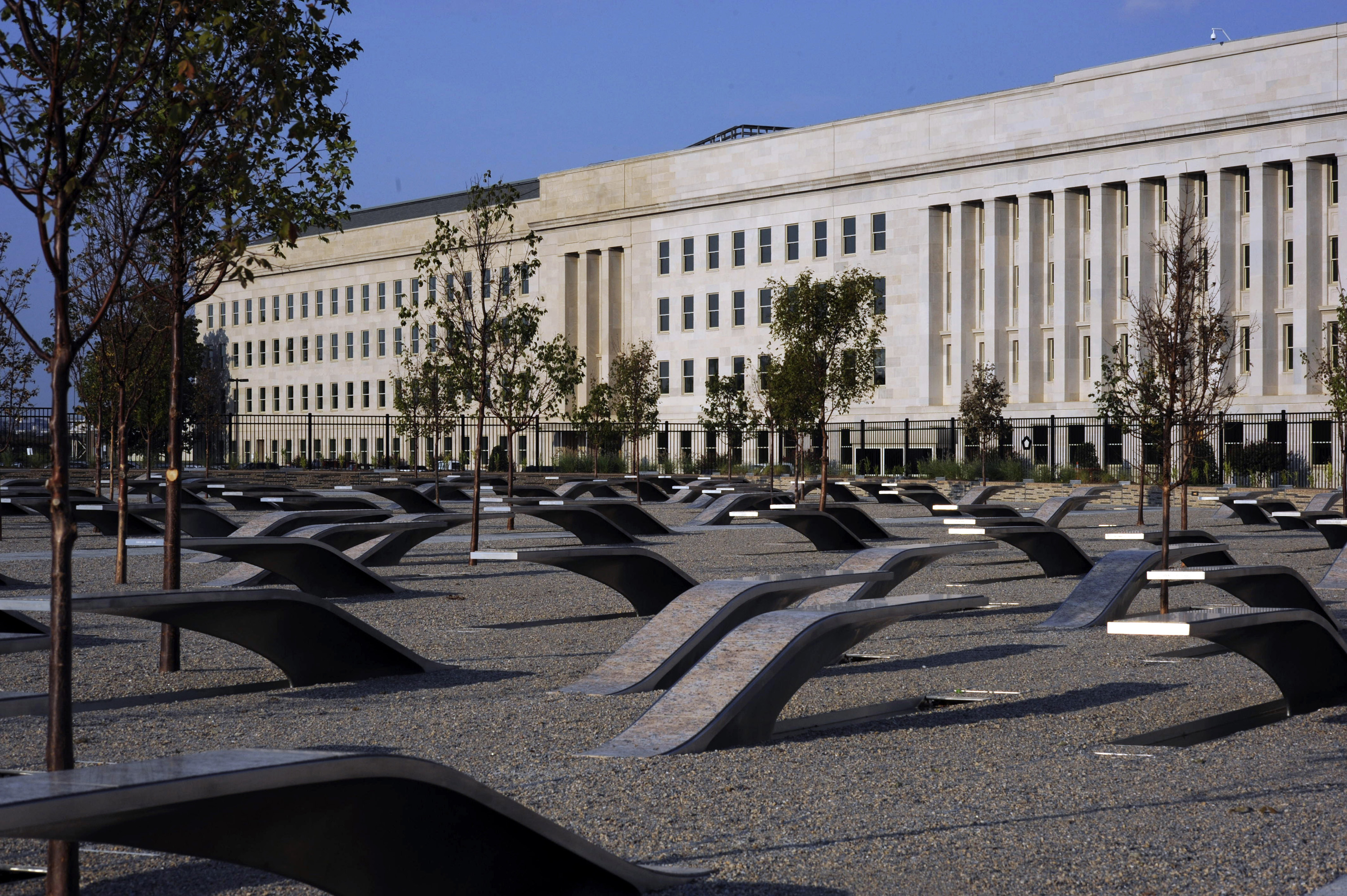
The Pentagon Memorial, located just east of Washington Boulevard

The first section of Washington Boulevard was built just north of the Fairfax line of the Washington, Arlington and Falls Church between Falls Church and Clarendon in the 1920s. Between I-395 and Clarendon, Washington Boulevard was built on the right-of-way of the Washington, Arlington and Falls Church's South Arlington Branch in the late 1920s. The road was completed when the section from I-395 to Memorial Circle was built in the early 1940s.

=== September 11 attacks ===
On September 11, 2001, many commuters and drivers witnessed the hijacked American Airlines Flight 77 as it passed directly over Washington Boulevard and crashed into The Pentagon. Witnesses included Daryl Donley and Steve Riskus, both who took some of the first photographs after the plane crashed. As the plane passed over Washington Boulevard, it clipped several light poles; one light pole landed on the windshield of a taxicab driven by Lloyd England. That section of Washington Boulevard was closed for several weeks following the attacks.

=== Other incidents ===
At 3:40 a.m. on December 22, 2004, a tank truck overturned and exploded on Washington Boulevard at the interchange with I-395, near the Pentagon. The accident killed the driver, and sparked initial concerns that this explosion was another terrorist attack. The driver was headed to the Citgo gas station, near the Pentagon.

=== Improvements ===
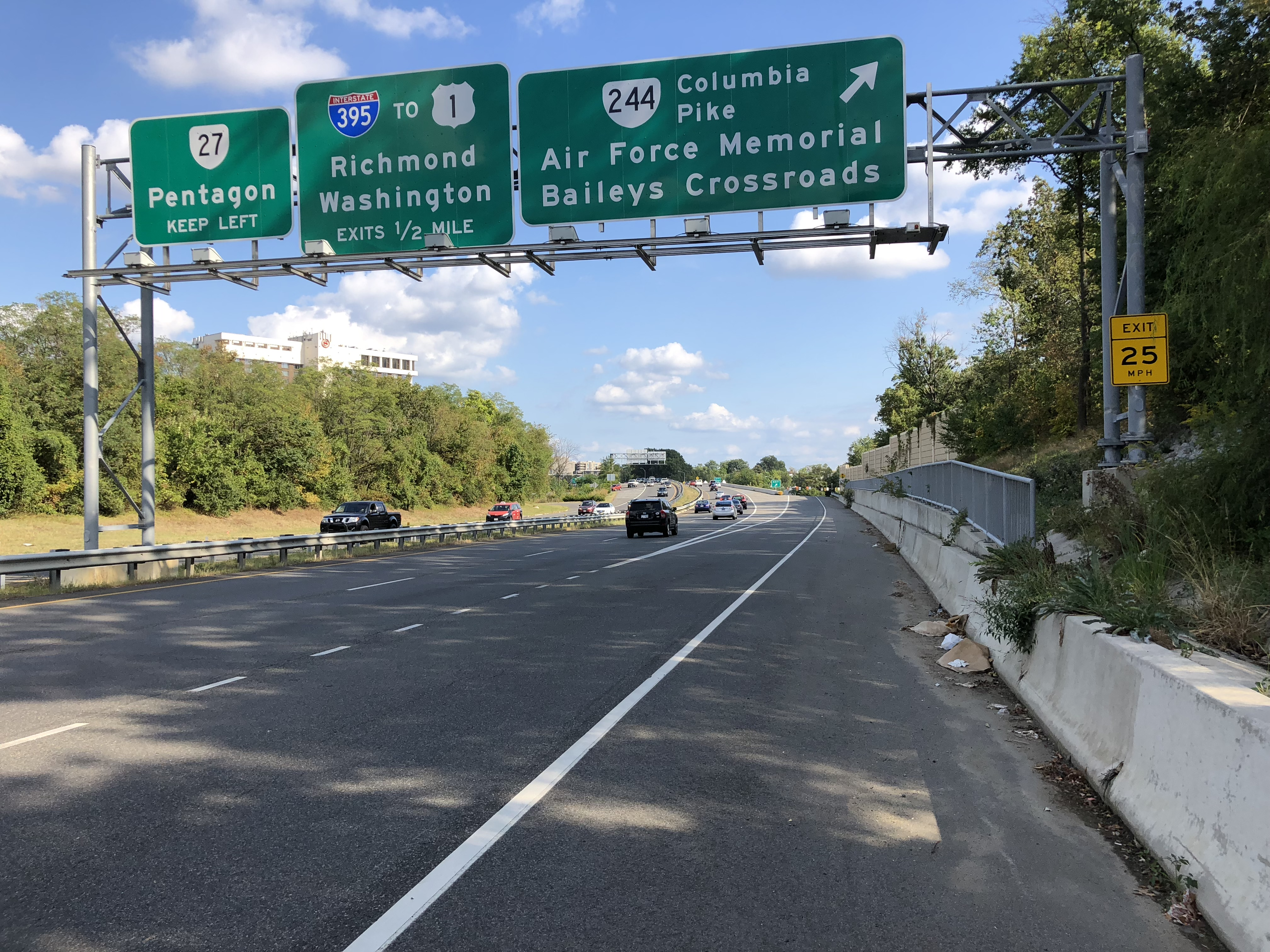
Eastbound traffic approaching the Freedmans Village Bridge

In 2012, work began on a new bridge over Columbia Pike, which had been in planning since 1990. The original bridge dated from the 1940s. Due to budget constraints, the bridge had to be scaled down, lacking the bicycle paths and other touches originally planned. Work was completed in December 2015 and the bridge was dedicated as the "Freedmans Village Bridge" in September 2015.

In 2015, VDOT began the work of replacing the bridge over Route 110/Richmond Highway that was built in 1941. Work lasted until May 2019 when the longer, higher and wider replacement bridge was completed. It was then named Arlington Veterans Bridge.

== Shared use path ==
The Washington Boulevard Trail is a shared use path along Washington Boulevard and Columbia Pike between the Mount Vernon Trail on Columbia Island and the Arlington Boulevard Trail in Arlington. It was built in two parts and then connected by two others.

The first of the two trails built was the east section from the Mount Vernon Trail to Columbia Pike. It runs 1.2 miles (1.9 km) through Lady Bird Johnson Park and then between the Boulevard and the Pentagon and the National 9/11 Pentagon Memorial. The trail was originally built concurrent with the Pentagon in 1943 as an unpaved path, but in 1993 the county made plans to pave and grade it, which was done in the late 1990s. In 2006, as part of a renovation of the Pentagon following 9/11, a section of the trail was built adjacent to the new security wall. Another section along the Pentagon Memorial was built in conjunction with that project and opened in September 2008. From 2015 to 2018, VDOT rebuilt the Washington Boulevard Bridge over Route 110, later renamed Arlington Veterans Bridge, with a 14' side path replacing the old, narrow sidewalk. At the same time they built the section of trail from the Pentagon parking lot ramp to the security wall section built in 2006 and built a short section from the Pentagon Memorial to Columbia Pike. That work was completed in December 2017.

The second trail was a 0.7-mile (1.1 km) long multi-use trail along the west side of the west part of Washington Boulevard's horseshoe. It stretches from Rolfe Street at Towers Park to Arlington Boulevard and the Arlington Boulevard Trail. It was first proposed in Arlington's 1994 Bicycle Transportation Plan. The first section of the trail, from Arlington Boulevard to Walter Reed Road, was built in 2009–2010. The section, from Walter Reed to Rolfe St. was built between February and November 2018, with the final ribbon cutting on the trail occurring on November 30, 2018.

The two sections were connected by a path alongside Columbia Pike. The first piece of that, between Rolfe and Orme Streets, was built in 2015 as part of the Freedman's Village Bridge. The final part of that was built in conjunction with the project to expand Arlington National Cemetery. That project, which started in 2019, realigned Columbia Pike and added the sidepath. The bicycle portion of that project opened with the road in September 2024.

== Major intersections ==
State	County	Location	mi	km	Destinations	Notes
Virginia	Arlington	East Falls Church	0.0	0.0	Westmoreland Street	
Virginia	Arlington	East Falls Church	0.2	0.32	I-66 west	Westbound exit only; tolled PM rush hours except HOV-2+ vehicles
Virginia	Arlington	East Falls Church	0.4	0.64	US 29 / SR 237 west (Lee Highway) – Falls Church	SR 237 continues west
Virginia	Arlington	East Falls Church	0.6	0.97	Eastern terminus of one-way segment	
Virginia	Arlington	Ballston	2.9	4.7	SR 120 / SR 237 east (Glebe Road) to I-66 east	SR 237 continues east
Virginia	Arlington	Clarendon	4.1	6.6	SR 237 (10th Street North)	
Virginia	Arlington	Lyon Park–Penrose line	5.0	8.0	US 50 – Falls Church, Washington	Western terminus of SR 27; separate exits for US 50 east and west
Virginia	Arlington	Penrose	5.3	8.5	South Courthouse Road / Second Street South – Fort Myer	Separate exit for Fort Myer northbound
Virginia	Arlington	Penrose	5.9	9.5	SR 244 (Columbia Pike) – Air Force Memorial, Baileys Crossroads	Freedmans Village Bridge; separate exits for SR 244 east and west northbound
Virginia	Arlington	Pentagon City	6.0– 6.3	9.7– 10.1	I-395 south / South Arlington Ridge Road – Richmond	Exit 8A on I-395
Virginia	Arlington	Pentagon City	6.0– 6.3	9.7– 10.1	I-395 north to US 1 – Washington	Eastbound exit and westbound entrance; exit 8B on I-395; also serves Army Navy Drive
Virginia	Arlington	Pentagon	6.7	10.8	HOV Lane	Westbound exit and eastbound entrance to I-395 HOV-3+ lanes (peak-direction)
Virginia	Arlington	Pentagon	6.7	10.8	SR 244 west (Columbia Pike) – Pentagon South Parking, Pentagon Memorial	Separate exits for SR 244 and parking westbound
Virginia	Arlington	Pentagon	7.2	11.6	Pentagon Mall and River Entrances	Southbound exit and entrance
Virginia	Arlington	Pentagon	7.4	11.9	To SR 110 north / I-395 north – Rosslyn, Pentagon North Parking, Lyndon B. Johnson Memorial Grove, Pentagon	Access via Boundary Channel Drive; signed for I-395 westbound, SR 110 eastbound
Boundary Channel			7.5	12.1	Bridge (eastern terminus of SR 27)	
District of Columbia	Washington (Columbia Island)		7.6	12.2	To I-395 – Ronald Reagan Washington National Airport, Alexandria, Mount Vernon	Access via George Washington Parkway south
District of Columbia	Washington (Columbia Island)		7.7	12.4	US 50 west – Rosslyn, Key Bridge, USMC War Memorial, Netherlands Carillon	Also serves George Washington Parkway north
District of Columbia	Washington (Columbia Island)		7.9	12.7	Memorial Bridge, Arlington National Cemetery	To Washington, DC
1.000 mi = 1.609 km; 1.000 km = 0.621 mi: Electronic toll collection; HOV only; Incomplete access; Route transition
