= Virginia State Route 27 =

State highway in Arlington County, Virginia, United States

State Route 27
- Washington Boulevard
- SR 27 highlighted in red

Route information
- Maintained by VDOT
- Length: 2.54 mi (4.09 km)
- Existed: 1964–present

Major junctions
- West end: US 50 in Arlington
- SR 244 in Arlington; I-395 in Arlington; SR 110 in Arlington
- East end: George Washington Parkway in Washington, D.C.

Location
- Country: United States
- State: Virginia
- Counties: Arlington

Highway system
- Virginia Routes; Interstate; US; Primary; Secondary; Byways; History; HOT lanes
← SR 26	→ SR 28

State Route 27 (SR 27) is a freeway in Arlington County, Virginia, in the United States, known as Washington Boulevard. It was built during World War II to connect the Pentagon with U.S. Route 50 (US 50) and northern Arlington to the west and Washington, D.C., to the east. Its 2.54-mile (4.09 km) route parallels the southern boundaries of Arlington National Cemetery. At its southernmost point, Route 27 passes through a complex interchange with Interstate 395 (I-395, Shirley Highway). called the "Mixing Bowl," although local motorists more recently use that term also to refer to the Springfield Interchange on the Capital Beltway in Springfield. It is an important commuter route as well as providing access to a number of military installations, the cemetery and national memorials. Because Route 27 is the closest road to the site of the September 11 attack on the Pentagon, the route has been designated the "9/11 Heroes Memorial Highway."

== Route description ==
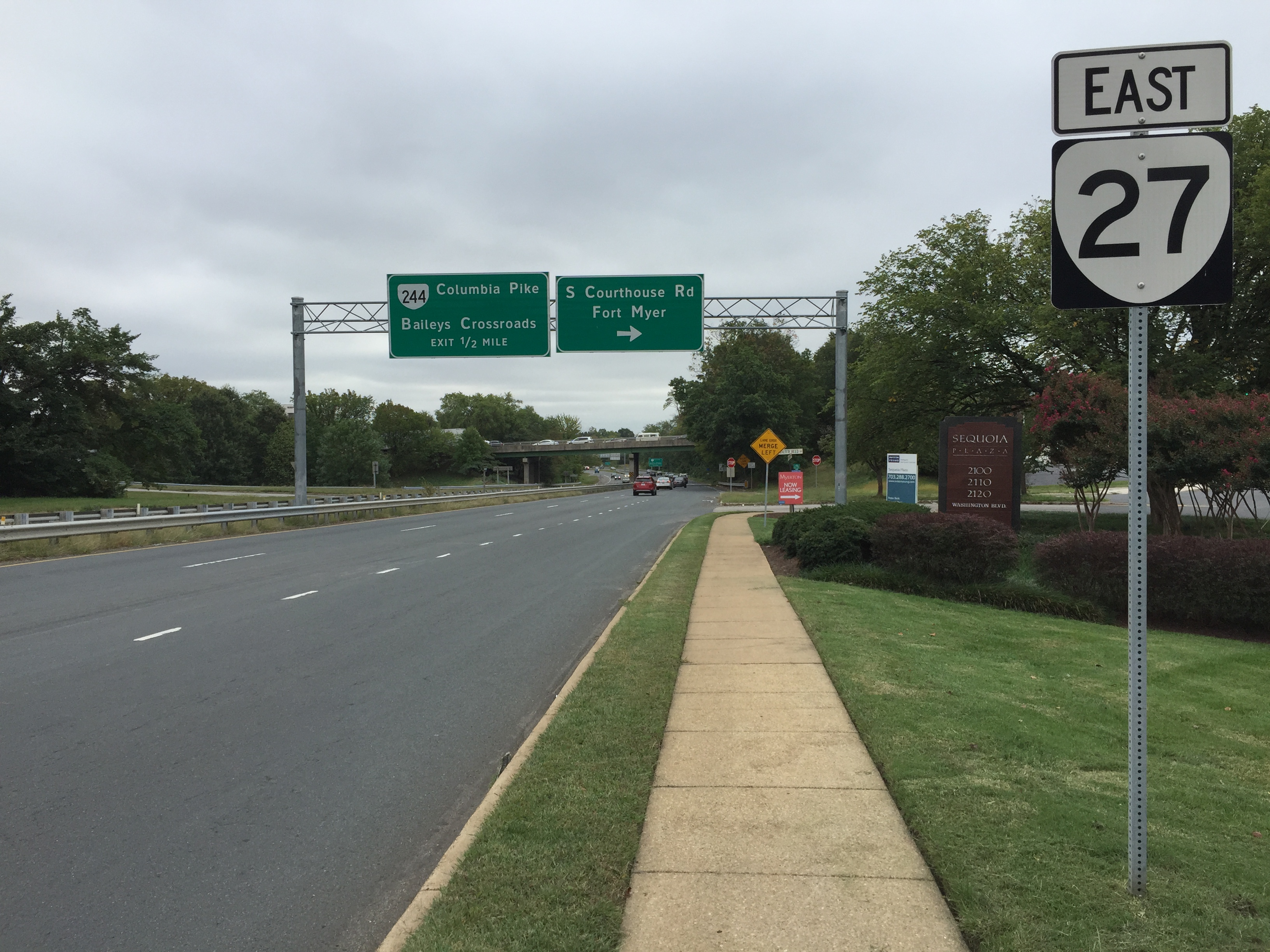
View east at the west end of SR 27 at US 50 in Arlington

Route 27 begins at an interchange with US 50. It then has an interchange with 2nd Street South, which serves as an entrance to Fort Myer. The next interchange with Route 244 offers a very short merge area because of the proximity to the exit ramps to I-395 and Arlington Ridge Road. The Mixing Bowl is the first interchange in Northern Virginia with a three level bridge—ramp from I-395 to westbound Route 27 on the lowest level, eastbound Route 27 to Mixing Bowl in the middle; and southbound I-395 on top. In 1970 this was followed by a second three level stack—Joyce Street South on the lowest level, eastbound Route 27 on the middle bridge and I-395 on the top level.

At this point, Route 27 becomes a part of the collector lanes and ramps of the Mixing Bowl until its second interchange with Route 244. Also, coincident with the second Route 244 interchange, Route 27 is the northern terminus of the reversible high occupancy vehicle lanes of I-395. The westbound entrance to these lanes have a series of manually closed barriers to prevent an accidental oncoming collision during the hours each day when traffic flows to the east on the HOV lanes. The final interchange in Virginia accesses Route 110, the Pentagon North Parking Lot and Boundary Channel Drive. Although the ramp from eastbound Route 27 to northbound Route 110 is open to the public, it is on the Pentagon Reservation and is patrolled by the Pentagon Police. The route ends at the Boundary Channel, which is the border with the District of Columbia.

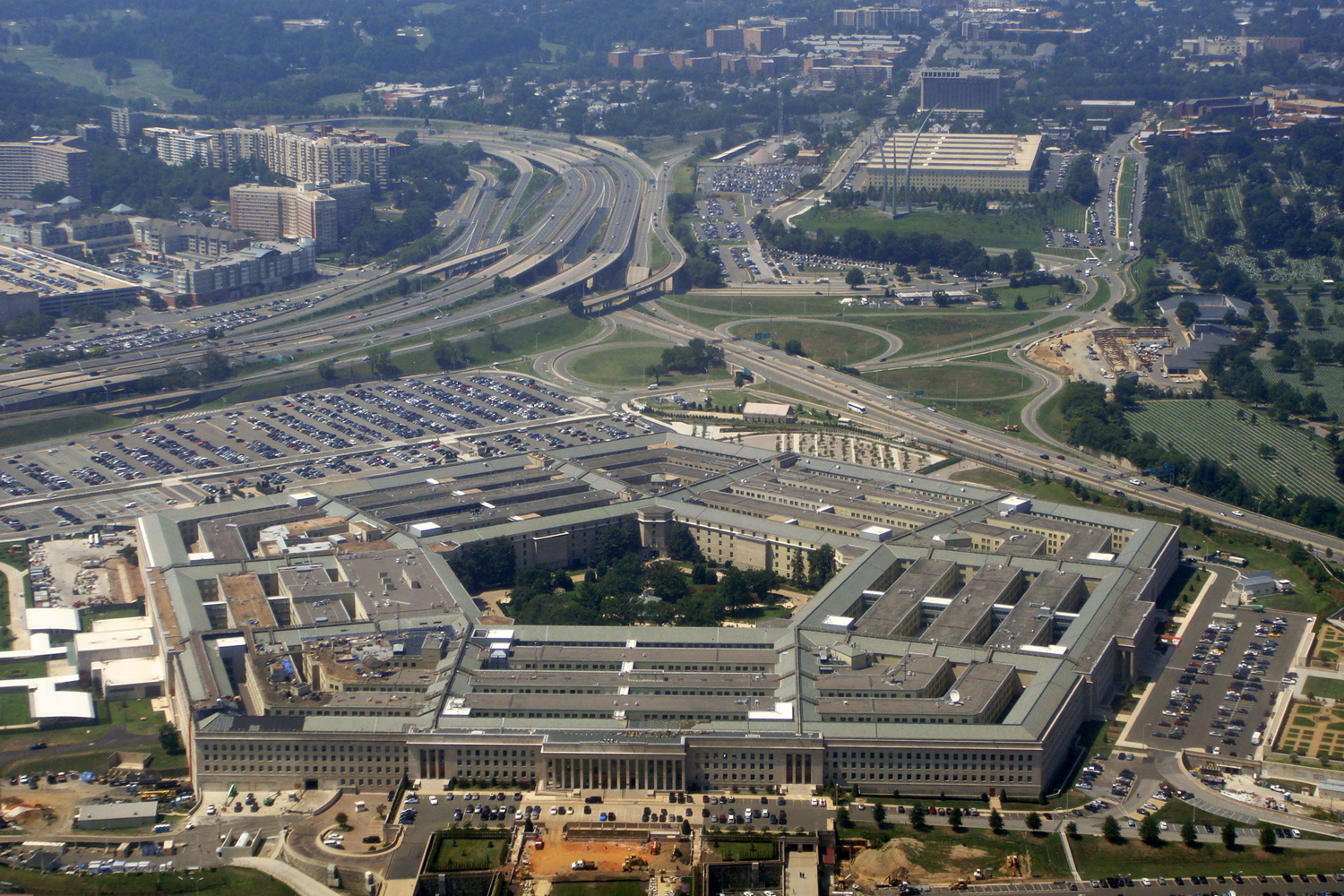
SR 27 enters photo on right, showing SR 244 cloverleaf with the Mixing Bowl near the top of the photo; SR 27 exits the photo at its upper right corner.

Route 27 is closed for large events held at the Pentagon including the annual Marine Corps Marathon and the Army Ten-Miler. A number of points of interest are visible from the highway, including (from west to east) Fort Myer (which was the site of the first military test flight), Henderson Hall, the headquarters of the United States Marine Corps, the United States Air Force Memorial, the Pentagon, the Navy Annex, the Pentagon Memorial, the Pentagon City Mall, and Arlington National Cemetery.

== History ==
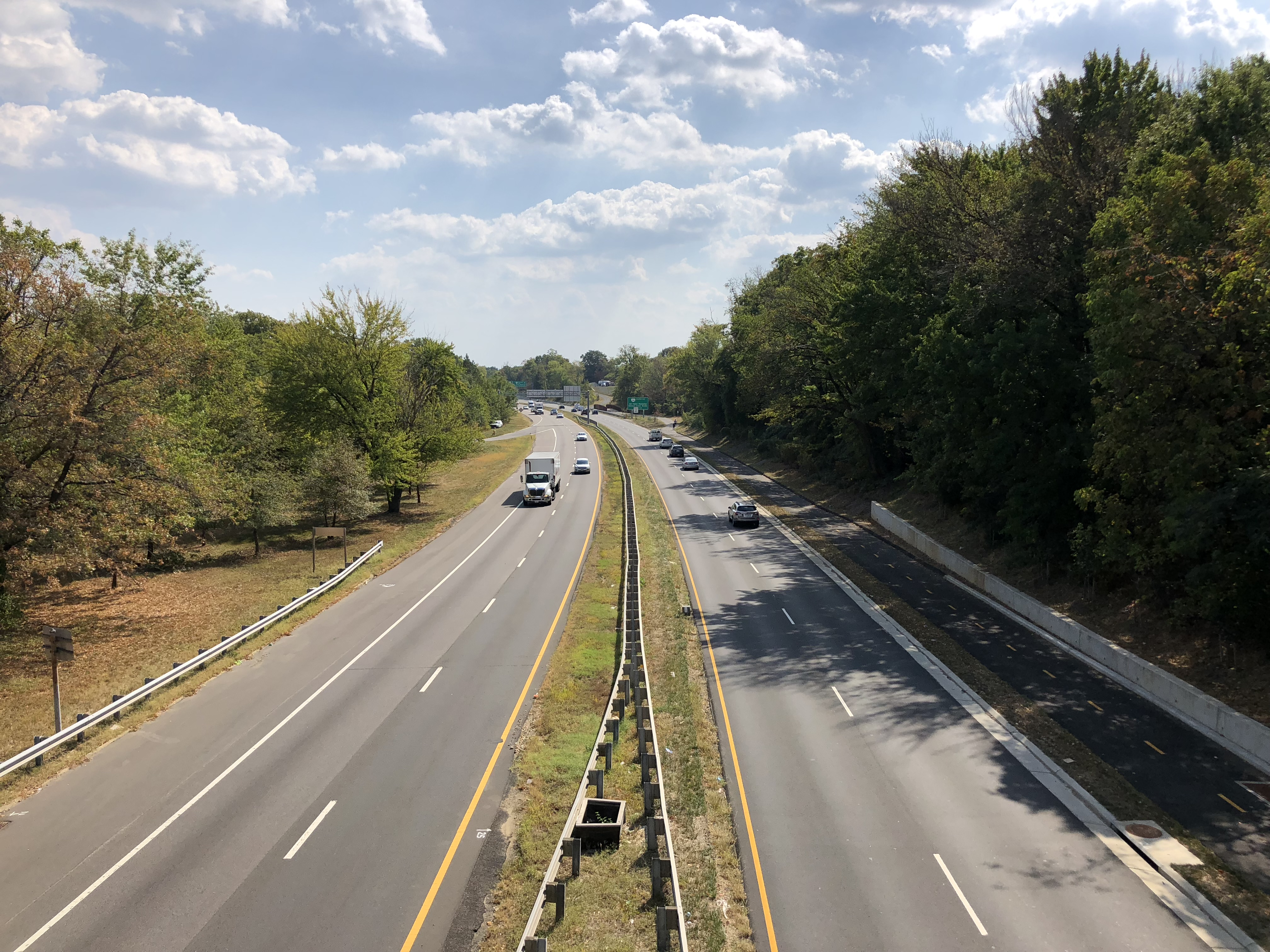
SR 27 eastbound at South Second Street

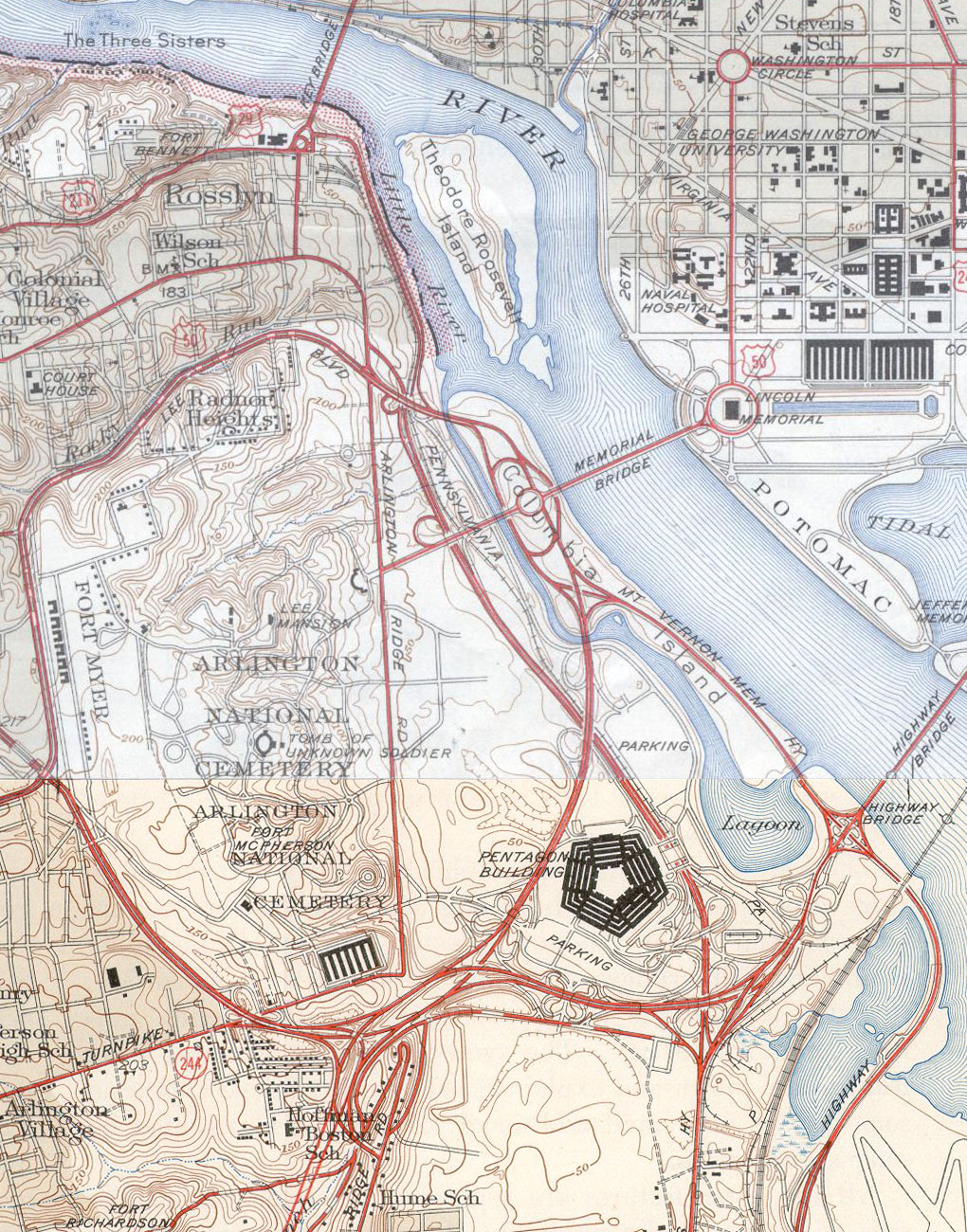
A 1945 map of the Pentagon road network, including what is now SR 27

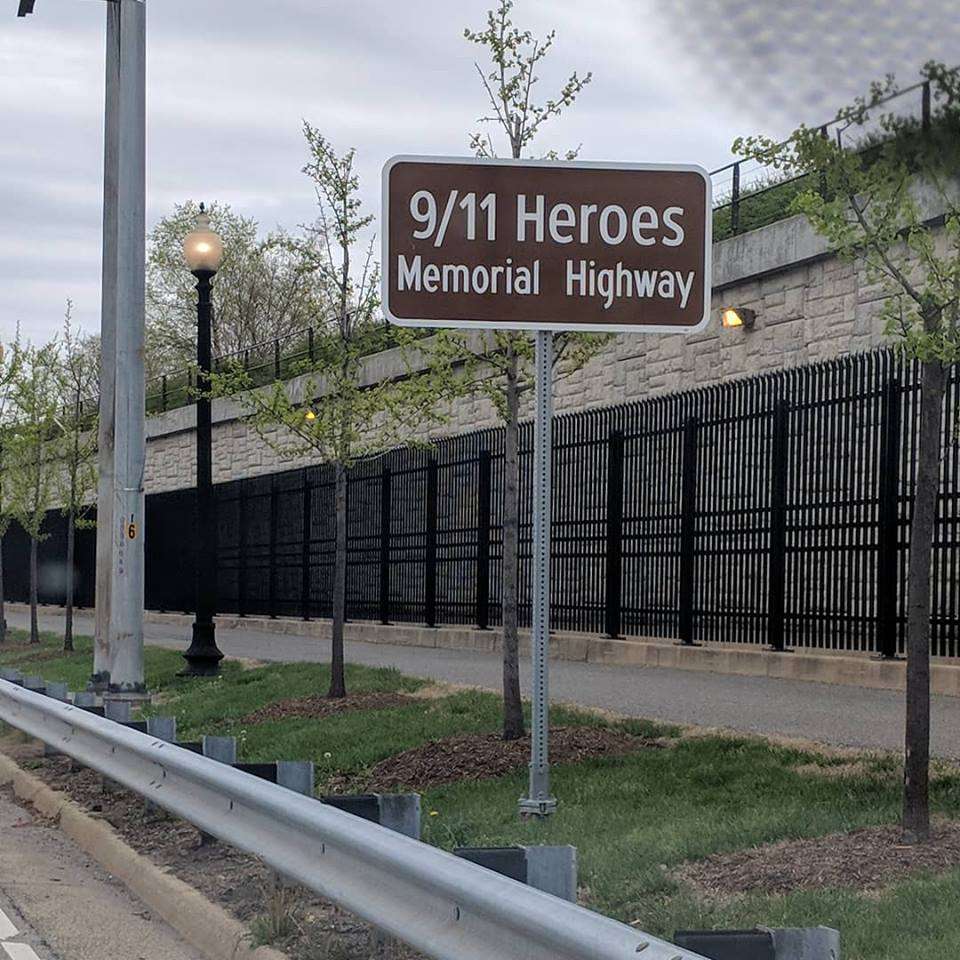
This sign lies just southwest of the Pentagon on SR 27 to commemorate the heroes who responded to the September 11 attacks; the Pentagon Memorial lies on the other side of the fence and wall.

The road was constructed as a part of the Pentagon Road Network during World War II to provide access to the newly constructed War Department headquarters buildings. The system included three cloverleaf interchanges which were "among the earliest such structures constructed in the United States." Those roads were transferred to the Virginia Department of Highways on December 17, 1964, and assigned the number Route 27. However, at that time, the Mixing Bowl included a ramp from the westbound Shirley Highway to the eastbound Route 27. When the high-occupancy vehicle lanes were added to I-395 in the 1970s, the Mixing Bowl was reconfigured so that the Route 27 lanes were separated as collector lanes from the through lanes of I-395. Because the collector lanes were built on the site of the ramp from westbound Shirley Highway to the eastbound Route 27, the ramp was replaced with a ramp from the eastbound Route 27 into the Pentagon South Parking Lot.

The Mixing Bowl is the first interchange in Northern Virginia with a three level bridge—ramp from I-395 to westbound Route 27 on the lowest level, eastbound Route 27 to Mixing Bowl in the middle; and southbound I-395 on top. In 1970 this was followed by a second three-level stack—Joyce Street South on the lowest level, eastbound Route 27 on the middle bridge and I-395 on the top level.

Route 27 is near the site of the September 11 attacks on the Pentagon. Many commuters and drivers on the road witnessed the hijacked American Airlines Flight 77 fly directly over Route 27 and crash into the Pentagon. Witnesses included Daryl Donley and Steve Riskus, both of whom took some of the first photographs after the plane crashed. As the plane passed over Route 27, it clipped several light poles; one light pole landed on the windshield of a taxicab driven by Lloyd England. The section northeast of I-395 was closed for several weeks following the attack as a security measure. When it reopened, "No stopping" signs were placed along the section of Route 27 near the Pentagon. To increase security, the cloverleaf interchange between Route 27 and Columbia Pike was reconfigured, by eliminating the separate loop ramp from eastbound Route 27 to westbound Columbia Pike. The ramp from westbound Columbia Pike to eastbound Route 27 was relocated parallel to Route 27 and the resulting freed area was used to construct a security checkpoint leading to a new Pentagon loading dock. A driveway from the checkpoint runs parallel to Route 27 separated by a high metal fence. However, the Pentagon Memorial still remains visible behind this fence. North of the memorial, a high cement retaining wall and berm has been constructed to protect the Pentagon from any possible explosion threats on Route 27. These and related security improvements cost $35 million (equivalent to $56 million in 2024) and were completed in October 2004. On September 11, 2010, the portion of Route 27 near the crash site was dedicated as "9/11 Heroes Memorial Highway" after receiving that designation by the State Legislature. Commemorative signs have been added on both sides of the highway.]

In 2001, planning began for a replacement of the US 50 bridge over Route 27, which had been built in 1944 by the War Department. Construction of a replacement bridge began in October 2005 and ended in August 2007. The project cost $6.5 million (equivalent to $10 million in 2024). At 3:40 a.m. on December 22, 2004, a gasoline tank truck overturned and exploded on Washington Boulevard at the Mixing Bowl, near the Pentagon. The accident killed the driver, and sparked initial concerns that this explosion was another terrorist attack. The driver was headed to a nearby gas station, near the Pentagon.

The bridge over Columbia Pike west of the Mixing Bowl was rated as "poor" and a new replacement bridge was proposed with a reconfiguration of the interchange. Construction on a replacement bridge began in early 2012 and was completed in December 2015. The bridge was dedicated as the "Freedmans Village Bridge" in September 2015.

== Exit list ==
The entire route is in Arlington County. All exits are unnumbered.

Location	mi	km	Destinations	Notes
Lyon Park–Penrose line	0.00	0.00	Washington Boulevard west – Clarendon	Continues west without designation
Lyon Park–Penrose line	0.00	0.00	US 50 – Falls Church, Washington, D.C.	Western terminus; separate exits for US 50 east and west
Penrose	0.27	0.43	South Courthouse Road / Second Street South – Fort Myer	Separate exit for Fort Myer northbound
Penrose	0.82	1.32	SR 244 (Columbia Pike) – Air Force Memorial, Baileys Crossroads	Freedmans Village Bridge; separate exits for SR 244 east and west northbound
Pentagon City	1.00	1.61	I-395 south / South Arlington Ridge Road – Richmond	Exit 8A on I-395
Pentagon City	1.40	2.25	I-395 north to US 1 – Washington	Eastbound exit and westbound entrance; exit 8B on I-395; also serves Army Navy Drive
Pentagon	1.69	2.72	I-395 Express south	Westbound exit and eastbound entrance only
Pentagon	1.69	2.72	SR 244 west (Columbia Pike) – Pentagon South Parking, Pentagon Memorial	Separate exits for SR 244 and parking westbound
Pentagon	2.31	3.72	Pentagon Mall and River Entrances	Southbound exit and entrance
Pentagon	2.31	3.72	To I-395 north / SR 110 north – Rosslyn, Pentagon North Parking, Lyndon B. Johnson Memorial Grove, Pentagon	Access via Boundary Channel Drive; signed for I-395 westbound, SR 110 eastbound
Boundary Channel	2.54	4.09	Washington Boulevard east – Arlington Cemetery, Memorial Bridge	Eastern terminus; continues onto Columbia Island (Washington, DC); to George Washington Parkway and US 50
1.000 mi = 1.609 km; 1.000 km = 0.621 mi: Electronic toll collection; Incomplete access
