= VA27 =

VA-27 has the following meanings:

- Attack Squadron 27 (U.S. Navy)
- State Route 27 (Virginia)
