= Virginia State Route 110 =

State highway in Arlington County, Virginia, United States

State Route 110
- Richmond Highway
- SR 110 highlighted in red

Route information
- Maintained by VDOT
- Length: 2.41 mi (3.88 km)
- Existed: 1964–present

Major junctions
- South end: I-395 / US 1 in Crystal City
- SR 27 in Arlington Cemetery
- North end: I-66 in Rosslyn

Location
- Country: United States
- State: Virginia
- Counties: Arlington

Highway system
- Virginia Routes; Interstate; US; Primary; Secondary; Byways; History; HOT lanes
← SR 109	→ SR 111

Virginia State Route 110 (SR 110) is a primary state highway in Arlington, Virginia. Known as the Richmond Highway (formerly Jefferson Davis Highway), the state highway runs 2.41 miles (3.88 km) from U.S. Route 1 (US 1) and Interstate 395 (I-395) in Crystal City north to I-66 in the Rosslyn neighborhood. SR 110 is a four- to six-lane freeway (with the exception of one at-grade intersection and a few driveways) that parallels the Potomac River, providing a connection between several of Arlington's urban villages and major landmarks, including the Pentagon, which is the headquarters of the United States Department of Defense, and the grounds of Arlington National Cemetery. The highway also provides access to SR 27, an east–west freeway between the Pentagon and the cemetery, and the George Washington Parkway that parallels the Potomac River. SR 110 is a part of the National Highway System for its entire length.

SR 110 is a part of the Pentagon road network, a network of freeways and surface roads built concurrent with the construction of the Pentagon in the early 1940s. The state highway received its numerical designation in 1964 when maintenance responsibility was transferred to the Virginia Department of Transportation. SR 110's most significant changes in routing were relocation of the highway in Rosslyn to tie into I-66 in the 1980s and relocation of the freeway at the Pentagon to provide a larger security buffer for the building after the September 11 attacks. The highway is sometimes closed for large events held at or around the Pentagon, including the Marine Corps Marathon. In 2019, SR 110 was renamed to Richmond Highway.

== Route description ==
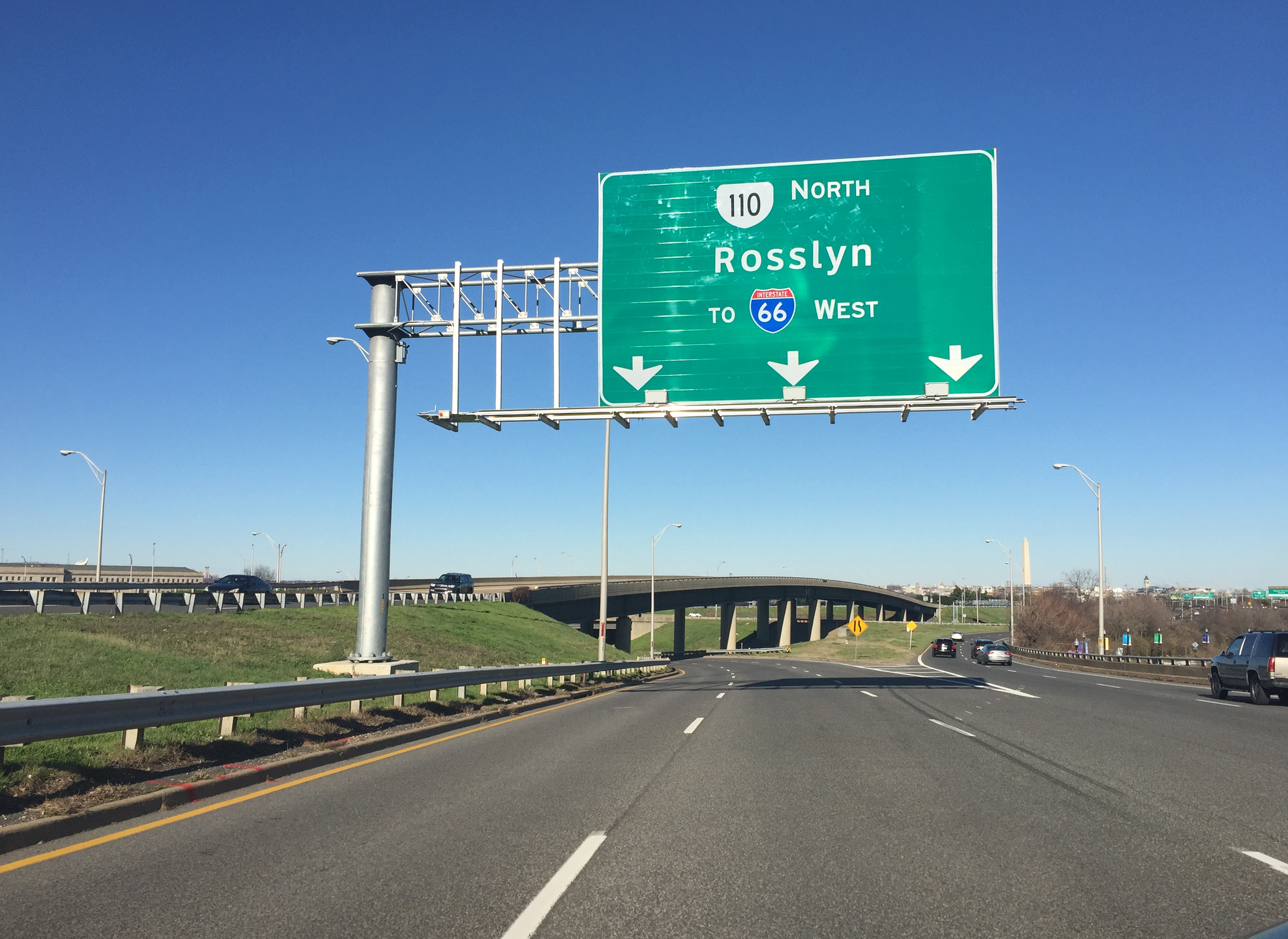
View north from the south end of SR 110 at I-395/US 1 in Crystal City

SR 110 begins at a partial interchange with US 1 (the southern continuation of the Richmond Highway) in Crystal City where US 1 joins I-395 to cross the 14th Street Bridge into Washington; the interchange allows access to and from US 1 in the direction of Alexandria. Immediately to the north, the state highway has a partial interchange with I-395 (Henry G. Shirley Memorial Highway) that allows access from southbound SR 110 to northbound I-395 and US 1 and from southbound I-395 to northbound SR 110. The southbound exit ramp also includes a ramp for Army–Navy Drive, one of the main streets of Pentagon City. North of I-395, SR 110 heads north with six lanes immediately to the east of the Pentagon reservation. The southbound freeway has ramps to and from the Pentagon South Parking area, which serves as the main and visitor entrance to the Department of Defense headquarters. SR 110 passes under a pair of pedestrian bridges from Pentagon parking areas on between Boundary Channel Drive, which parallels the freeway, and the Boundary Channel's Pentagon Lagoon. SR 110 has a southbound exit to and entrance from the Pentagon Mall Terrace and River Terrace areas before the highway leaves the vicinity of the Pentagon by passing under SR 27 (Washington Boulevard). The partial interchange between the highways allows access from eastbound SR 27 to northbound SR 110 and from southbound SR 110 to westbound SR 27, which leads to southbound I-395 and SR 244 (Columbia Pike).

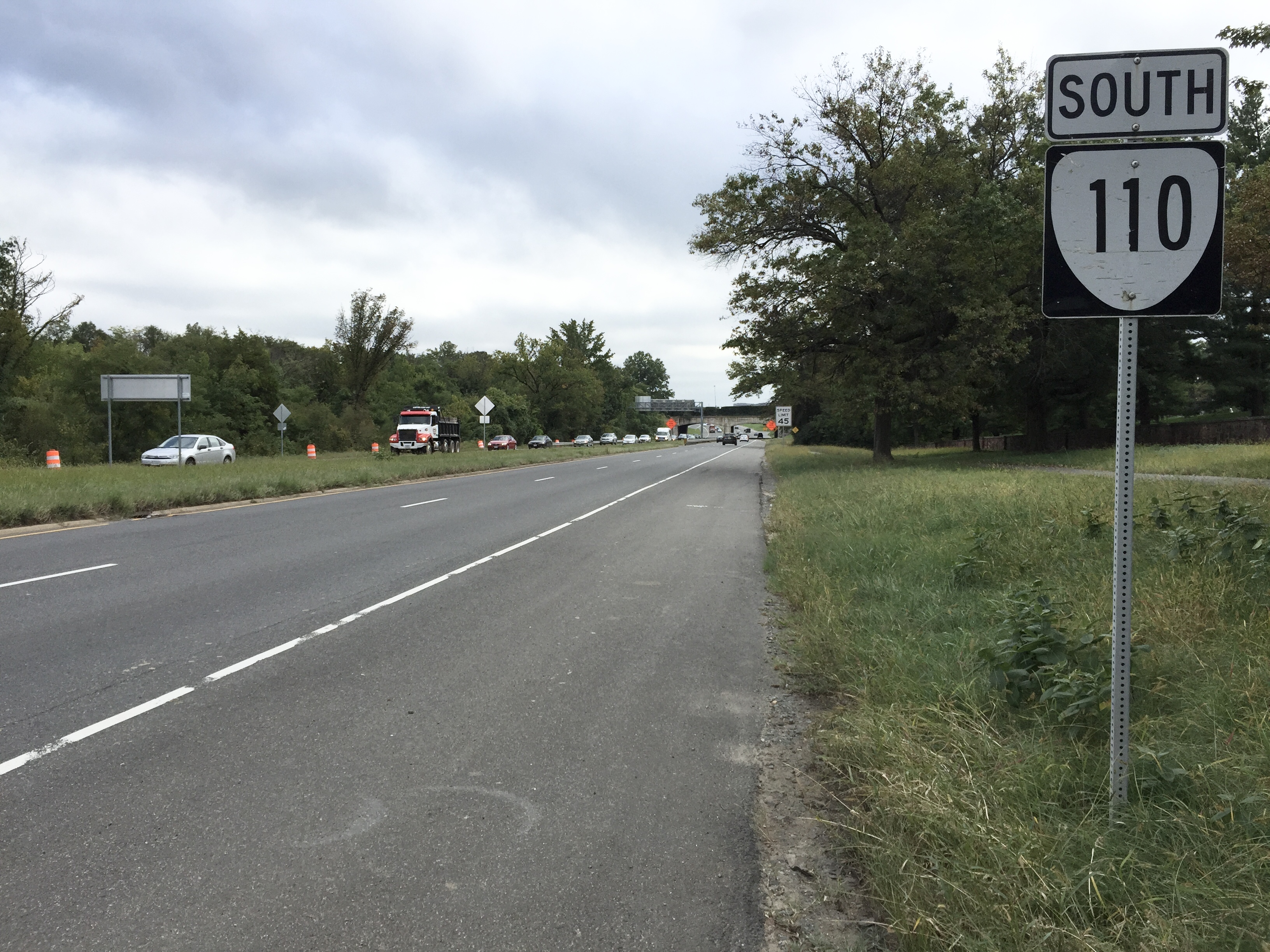
View south along SR 110 at Marshall Drive

North of SR 27, the freeway passes between the Washington Metro's Blue Line on the east and the grounds of Arlington National Cemetery to the west. SR 110 has a northbound exit to and southbound entrance from Memorial Drive, which is the main entrance to the national cemetery and also leads to the Arlington Memorial Bridge to Washington and the George Washington Memorial Parkway. SR 110 continues north with four lanes and has its sole at-grade intersection at Marshall Drive, which leads to the Marine Corps War Memorial, also known as the Iwo Jima Memorial, and the Netherlands Carillon. The highway leaves the cemetery for the urban village of Rosslyn, where the highway reaches its northern terminus. SR 110 passes under US 50 with no access then has a northbound exit and southbound entrance for Wilson Boulevard, one of the main streets of Rosslyn. Immediately to the north, the highway ends at a partial interchange with I-66 allowing access to and from the direction of Falls Church. Westbound I-66 leads to Dulles International Airport and Front Royal.

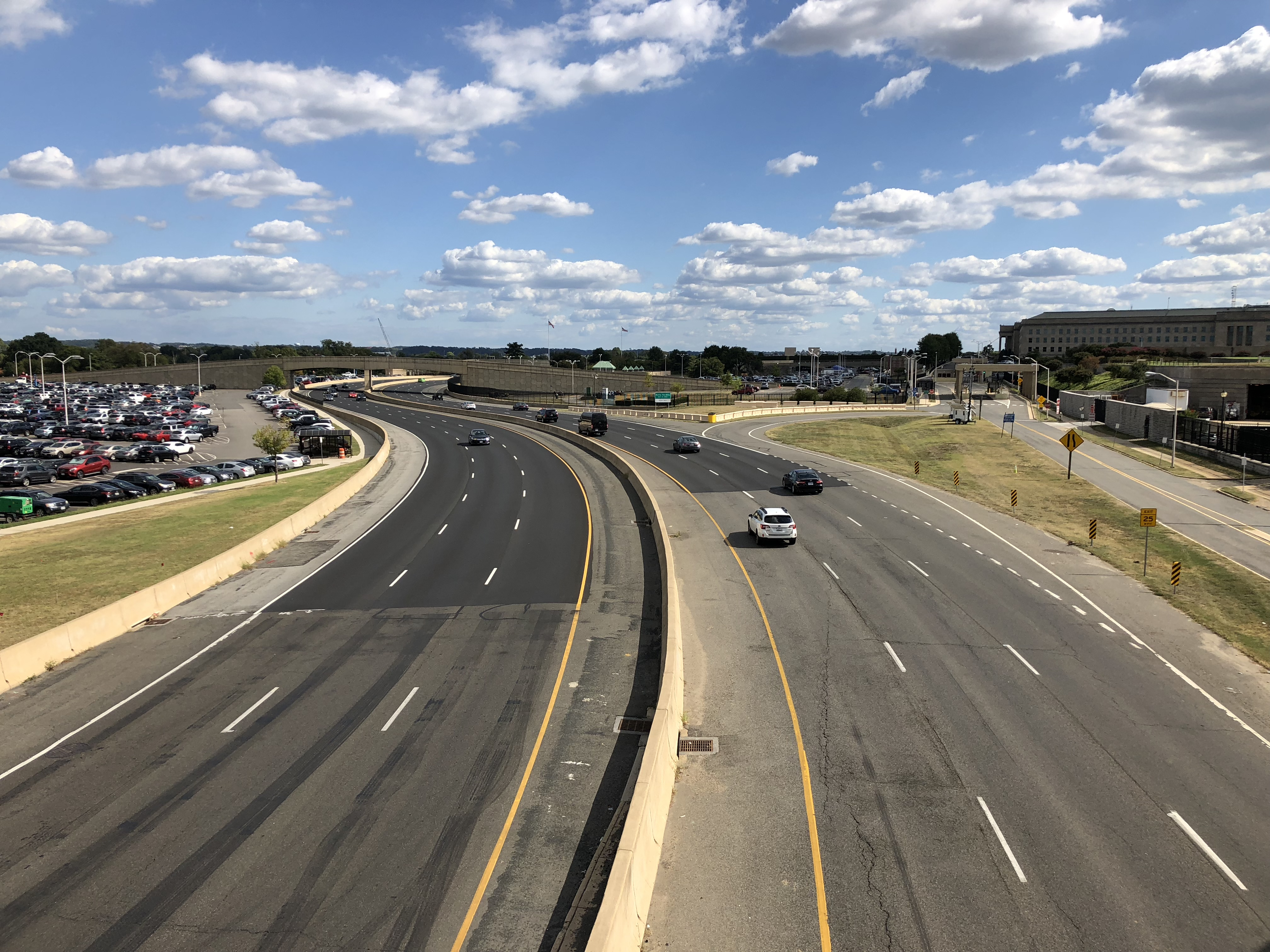
SR 110 southbound at SR 27

== History ==
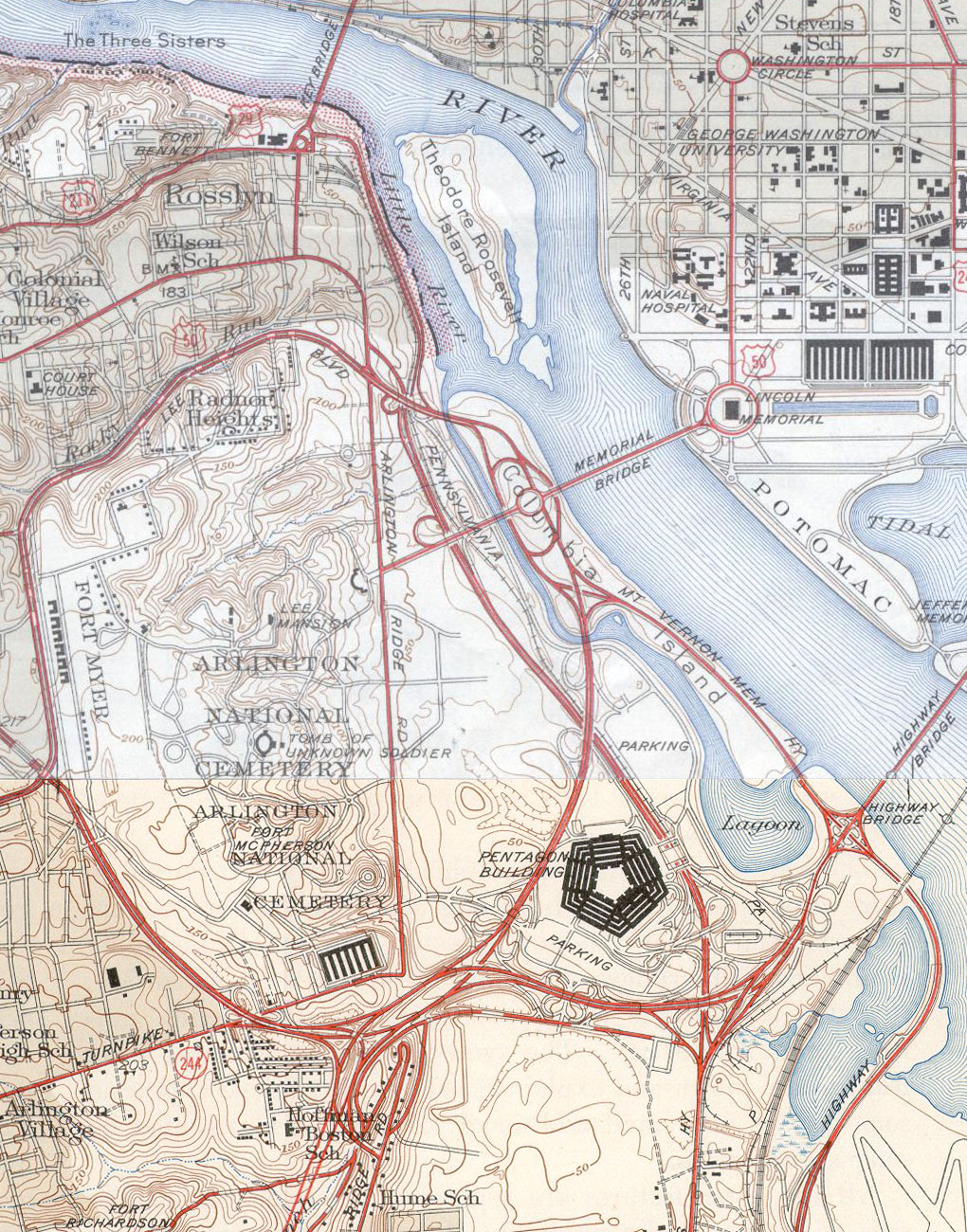
1945 map of the Pentagon road network, including what is now SR 110

The road was constructed as a part of the Pentagon Road network during World War II. Those roads were transferred to the Virginia Department of Highways on December 17, 1964, and assigned the number SR 110. At this time, the north end was reconfigured to accommodate the construction to the Theodore Roosevelt Bridge in 1964 over the Potomac River and the re-routing of Arlington Ridge Road. As a result, the north end of SR 110 was shifted west toward the prior bridge that carried US 50 over Arlington Ridge Road. SR 110 then proceeded north on the Arlington Ridge Road right-of-way, under the new bridges that carried the approaches to the Roosevelt Bridge reaching Wilson Boulevard. The road extended north to merge with the future I-66 at the Virginia end of the Roosevelt Bridge. Until the 1980s, this extension ended with the exit and entrance ramps to Lee Highway at Lynn Street. However, when I-66 was completed, this stub was extended so that SR 110 had full access to westbound I-66. One block of the historic Arlington Ridge Road was left to act as a frontage road between Wilson Boulevard and 15th Street North.

Following the September 11 attacks, SR 110 was closed to trucks and tour buses due to its proximity to the Pentagon. Police checkpoints were staffed around the clock to enforce this restriction. In September 2002, a contract was awarded to reroute SR 110 to increase the standoff distance between vehicles and the Pentagon. The project, called the Pentagon Secure Bypass, was completed in 2004. SR 110 was shifted eastward in a long arc to maintain a buffer distance from the Pentagon and a two-lane bridge to provide access to the Pentagon North parking lot and two pedestrian bridges were built over the new route. These and related security improvements cost $35 million (equivalent to $60 million in 2025) and were completed in October 2004.

In April 2019, the Arlington County Board voted to rename SR 110 to Richmond Highway. This went into effect in October 2019.

== Exit list ==
The entire route is in Arlington County. All exits are unnumbered.

Location	mi	km	Destinations	Notes
Crystal City	0.00	0.00	US 1 south – Alexandria, Crystal City, Reagan National Airport	Southern terminus; Richmond Highway continues south along US 1
Crystal City	0.20	0.32	I-395 north / US 1 north – Washington, Pentagon City	Exit 8B on I-395; southbound exit and northbound entrance
The Pentagon	0.30	0.48	Pentagon Transit Center	Southbound exit and entrance; authorized buses only
The Pentagon	0.90	1.45	Pentagon River Terrace, Mall Terrace	Southbound exit and entrance
Arlington Cemetery	1.12	1.80	SR 27 west (Washington Boulevard) to I-395 south / SR 244 west (Columbia Pike)	Southbound exit and northbound entrance
Arlington Cemetery	1.70	2.74	Arlington Cemetery / Memorial Bridge – Washington	Northbound exit and southbound entrance; serves Arlington Cemetery station
Arlington Cemetery	1.90	3.06	Marshall Drive – Netherlands Carillon, Iwo Jima Memorial, Fort Myer	At-grade intersection; no northbound entrance
Rosslyn	2.30	3.70	Wilson Boulevard – Rosslyn	Northbound exit and southbound entrance
Rosslyn	2.41	3.88	I-66 west to US 29 south – Rosslyn, Key Bridge, Dulles International Airport, Front Royal	Exit 75 on I-66; tolled PM rush hours (except HOV-3+ vehicles); northern terminus
1.000 mi = 1.609 km; 1.000 km = 0.621 mi: Electronic toll collection; Incomplete access
