= Mount Vernon Memorial Highway =

The Mount Vernon Memorial Highway may refer to:

- George Washington Memorial Parkway, formerly known as the Mount Vernon Memorial Highway
- Virginia State Route 235, currently known as the Mount Vernon Memorial Highway
