= United States Air Force Memorial =

Memorial in Arlington, Virginia

U.S. Air Force Memorial
- United States Air Force
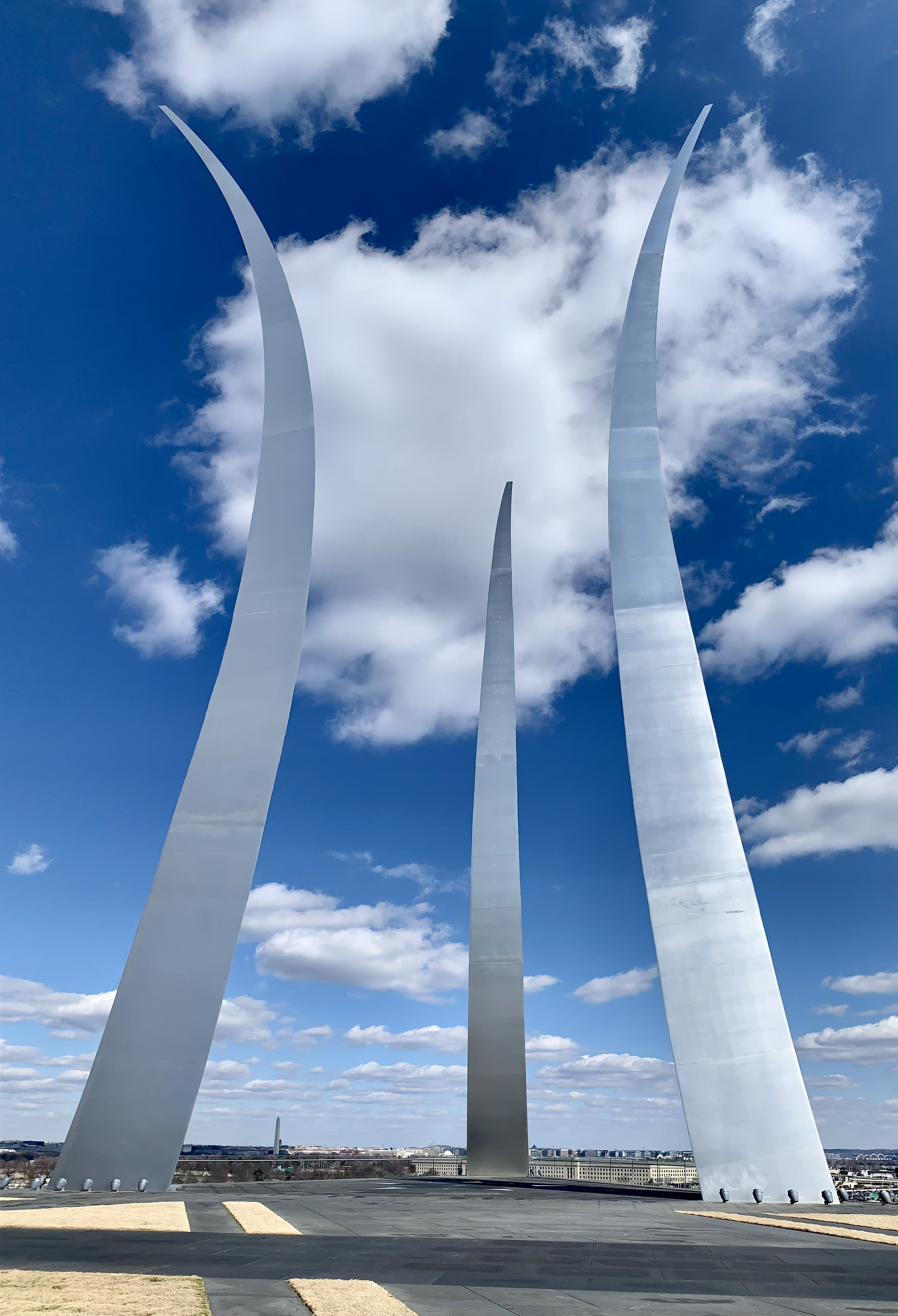
- The Air Force Memorial viewed facing The Pentagon
- For the service and sacrifices of the men and women of the United States Air Force and its predecessor organizations, including the Aeronautical Division, U.S. Signal Corps; the Aviation Section, U.S. Signal Corps; the Division of Military Aeronautics, Secretary of War; the Army Air Service; the U.S. Army Air Corps; and the U.S. Army Air Forces
- Established: 1992
- Unveiled: 14 October 2006; 19 years ago
- Location: 38.868649°N 77.066259°W; Arlington County, Virginia, U.S.
- Designed by: James Ingo Freed (Pei Cobb Freed & Partners)
- Integrity; Service; Excellence; Valor; Courage; Sacrifice
- Statistics source: Air Force Association; Air Force Memorial Foundation

The United States Air Force Memorial honors the service of the personnel of the United States Air Force and its heritage organizations. The Memorial is located in Arlington County, Virginia, on the former grounds of the Navy Annex near the Pentagon and Arlington National Cemetery. The Memorial is southwest of the intersection of Columbia Pike and South Joyce Street and is accessible from the north side of Columbia Pike. It was the last project of American architect James Ingo Freed (known for the design of the United States Holocaust Memorial Museum) with the firm Pei Cobb Freed & Partners.

== History ==
In January 1992, the Air Force Memorial Foundation was incorporated to pursue the development of a memorial that would honor the people in the United States Air Force. In December 1993, President Bill Clinton signed Pub. L. 103–163 authorizing the Air Force Memorial. In 1994, the National Capital Memorial Advisory Commission approved a site next to Marshall Drive and State Route 110, down the hill from the Netherlands Carillon, known as Arlington Ridge. Fundraising and detailed designs began.

Because the site was near the Marine Corps War Memorial, which is just north of the Carillon, various Marine groups were briefed on the plans; they voiced no objections. However, on 30 July 1997, Congressman Gerald Solomon (R-NY), a Marine veteran, introduced a bill to prohibit the construction of any monument, memorial, or other structure "within view" of the Marine Corps War Memorial. The Air Force Association organized support for the memorial on behalf of its membership and Air Force veterans, and the issue became a polarizing one between the services.

On 16 September 1997, the Friends of Iwo Jima and Solomon filed for an injunction against the construction of the Air Force Memorial. The request was denied on 15 June 1998, and the U.S. Court of Appeals for the Fourth Circuit then dismissed the appeal of that decision on 7 May 1999. But the cost of litigation and the opposition of prominent Marine veterans in Congress convinced the Foundation to move the Memorial to its present site, at the east end of Columbia Pike, on the grounds of Fort Myer just south of Arlington National Cemetery.

On 28 December 2001, President George W. Bush signed the Defense Authorization Bill, which included a rider directing the Department of Defense to make available to the Air Force Memorial Foundation up to 3 acres (12,000 m^{2}) of the Naval Annex property for the memorial. Ground was formally broken in September 2004. Construction of the spires began in February 2006 and was completed in seven months.

The memorial was dedicated on 14 October 2006, with about 30,000 people attending. The keynote address was delivered by President Bush, a former F-102 Delta Dagger pilot with the Texas Air National Guard. The first official ceremony at the memorial was held the next day: Secretary of the Air Force Michael Wynne laid a memorial wreath beneath the spires for fallen airmen.

To all who have climbed sunward and chased the shouting wind, America stops to say: your service and your sacrifice will be remembered forever, and honored in this place by the citizens of a free and grateful nation.

— President George W. Bush at acceptance ceremony.

In April 2017, the day-to-day operations of the Air Force Memorial were transferred to the Air Force District of Washington. The Air Force Memorial Foundation, the organization created to plan for and build the Memorial, continued until 2020 as an affiliate of the Air Force Association. Three people served as managing director: retired Air Force Col. Pete Lindquest and retired Air Force Command Master Sergeant Barbara Taylor.

== Design ==
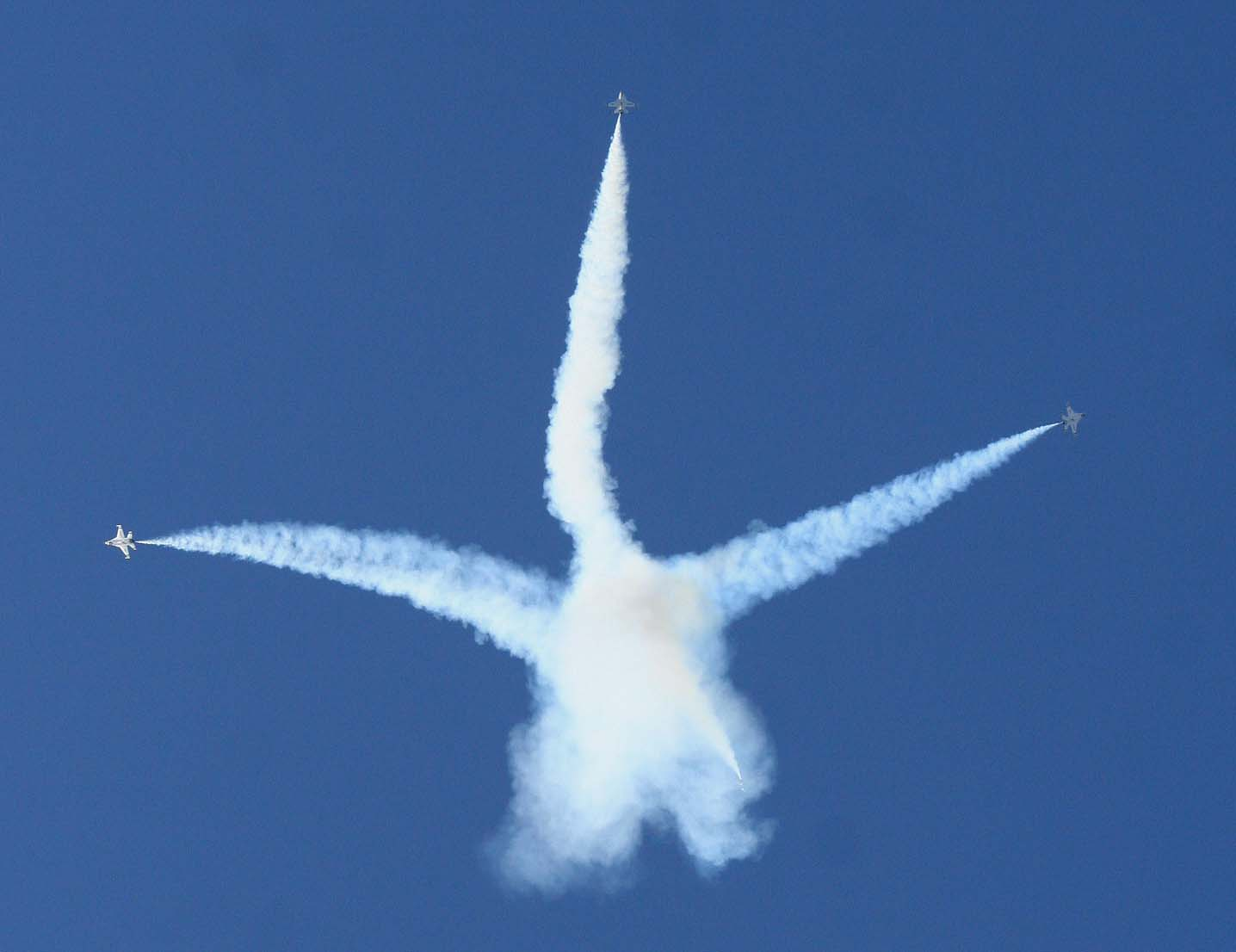
Thunderbirds performing their signature "bomb burst" maneuver

The view of the USAF Memorial from Washington, D.C.

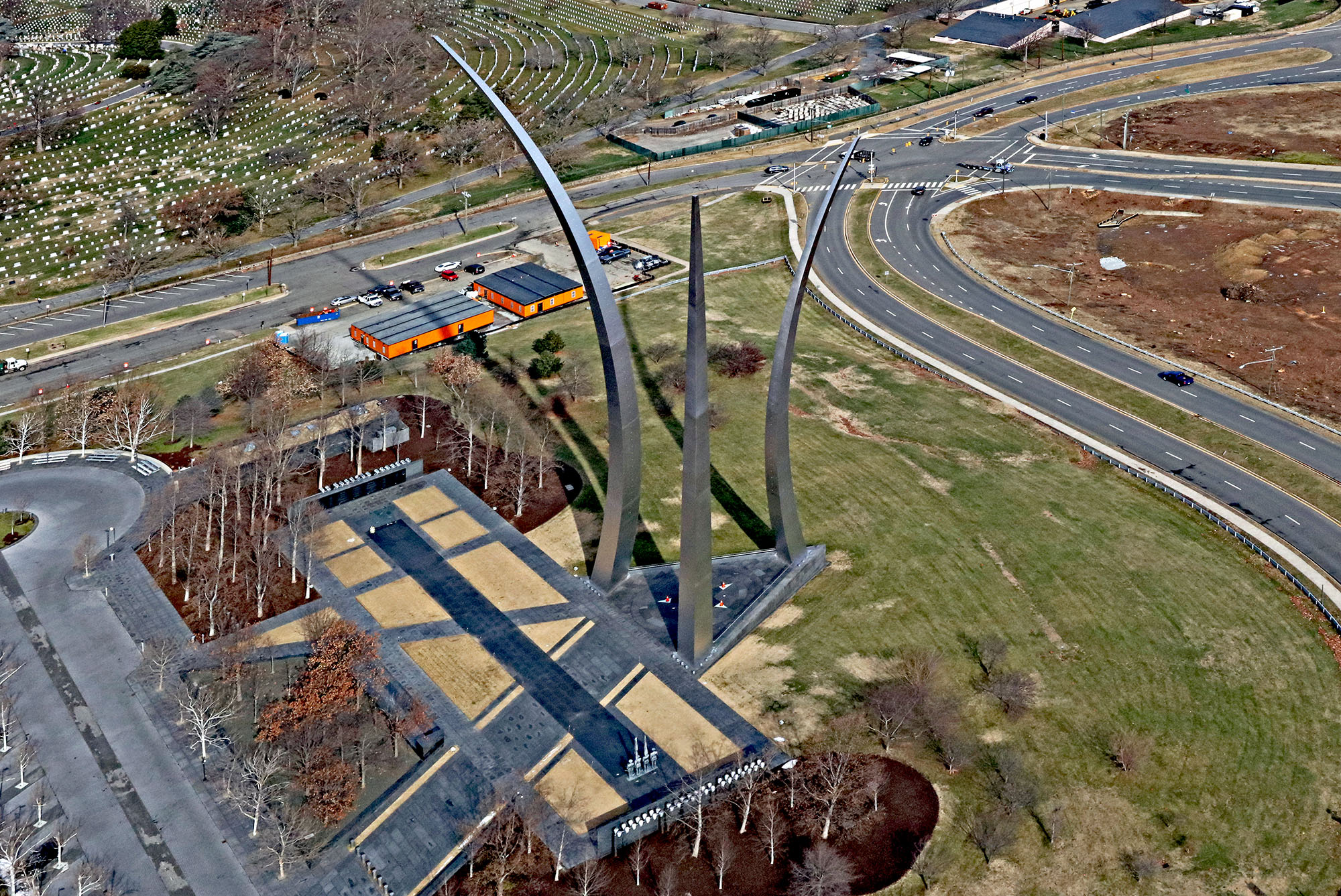
United States Air Force Memorial

The three memorial spires range from 201 feet (61 m) to 270 feet (82 m) high and appear to be soaring; its array of stainless steel arcs against the sky evokes the image of "contrails of the Air Force Thunderbirds as they peel back in a precision 'bomb burst' maneuver." Only three of the four contrails are depicted, at 120 degrees from each other, as the absent fourth suggests the missing man formation traditionally used at Air Force funeral flyovers.

The spire structure consists of stainless steel plates with high-strength concrete filling the lower 2/3 of each spire. The upper third is hollow stainless steel. At the transition between concrete and hollow steel portions, dampers provide aerodynamic stability and dissipate wind sway energy. Each damper consists of a lead ball weighing about a ton that is allowed to roll inside a steel box. The structural design of the spires was completed by the Arup engineering consultancy.

Pedestrians approach to the spires from the west. South of the approach, before the inscription wall, stand four 8-foot-tall (2.4 m) bronze statues representing the United States Air Force Honor Guard, sculpted by Zenos Frudakis. To the north, a stone plaza leads you to the glass contemplation wall, a free-standing glass panel with the images of four F-16s flying in a missing-man formation engraved on both sides of the 5-ply panel. Except for the information kiosks outside the administration building, it is the only part of the memorial that depicts aircraft. The north inscription wall is visible through it.

The two inscription walls are located at each end of the central lawn. The walls are 56 feet (17 m) in length, 10 feet (3.0 m) in height and one foot thick. Both walls are made of polished, highly-reflective monolithic Jet Mist granite and both include a two and a half-inch outer inscription panel made from Absolute Black granite. The north wall bears the names of Air Force recipients of the Medal of Honor, and the south wall bears inspirational quotations regarding core values, particularly the Air Force's three core values: "integrity first, service before self, and excellence in all we do".

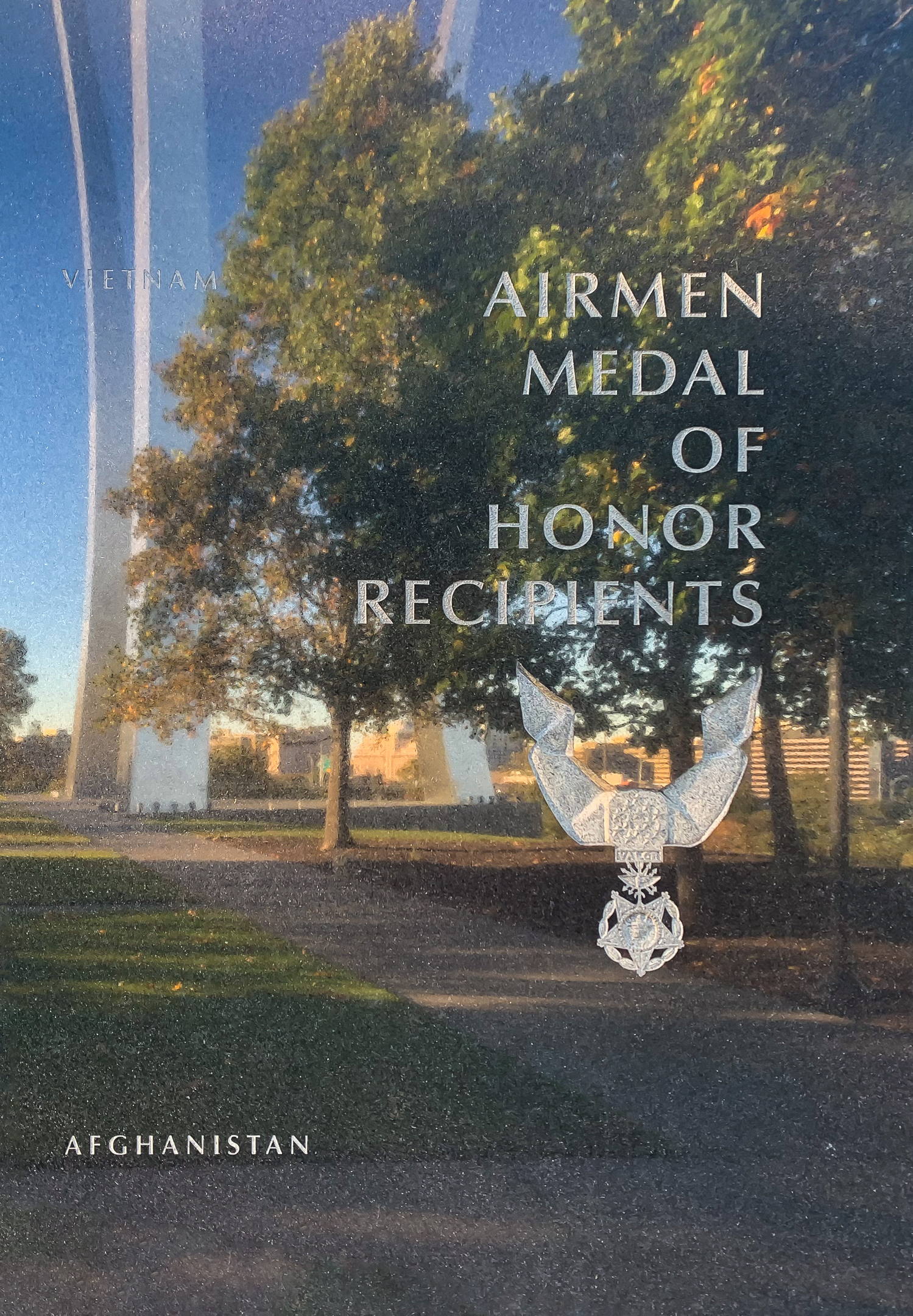
The wall of Medal of Honor recipients, with the memorial in the reflection.

One name has been removed from the Medal of Honor Recipients, under the header of "Peacetime". This name listed was that of Colonel William "Billy" Mitchell, and it was removed due to a clerical error in actual Medal of Honor recipients in a Congressional Report published in 1979. His name was included on the wall at the memorial in error and has since been removed. The removal is quite visible, with the name being cut out of the stone, and a new stone filler in its place above the name of Charles Lindbergh. ″There is some debate as to whether Mitchell was in fact awarded the Medal of Honor or the Congressional Gold Medal. The act cited directs that "a gold medal" be struck and presented in recognition of Mitchell's pioneer service and foresight. It does not, however, specify which medal was to be awarded. In July 1945 the War Department had recommended to Congress that special gold medals be voted by Congress in cases of outstanding leadership and that the Medal of Honor be reserved for awarding only gallantry in action. Major General William "Billy" Mitchell was awarded the Congressional Gold Medal, which was announced using the identical citation and approved date as listed for the award above. It seems apparent that the intention was to award the Gold Medal rather than the Medal of Honor. However, for some unknown reason, when the Senate Committee on Veterans' Affairs published its report, Medal of Honor Recipients: 1863-1978 (Washington, D.C.: Government Printing Office, 1979) compiling all Medal of Honor Recipient citations, William Mitchell and his citation were included. This website takes its Medal of Honor citations from that report, and that is why Mitchell's citation is included here - although the "gold medal" authorized above is most likely the Congressional Gold Medal, rather than the Medal of Honor."

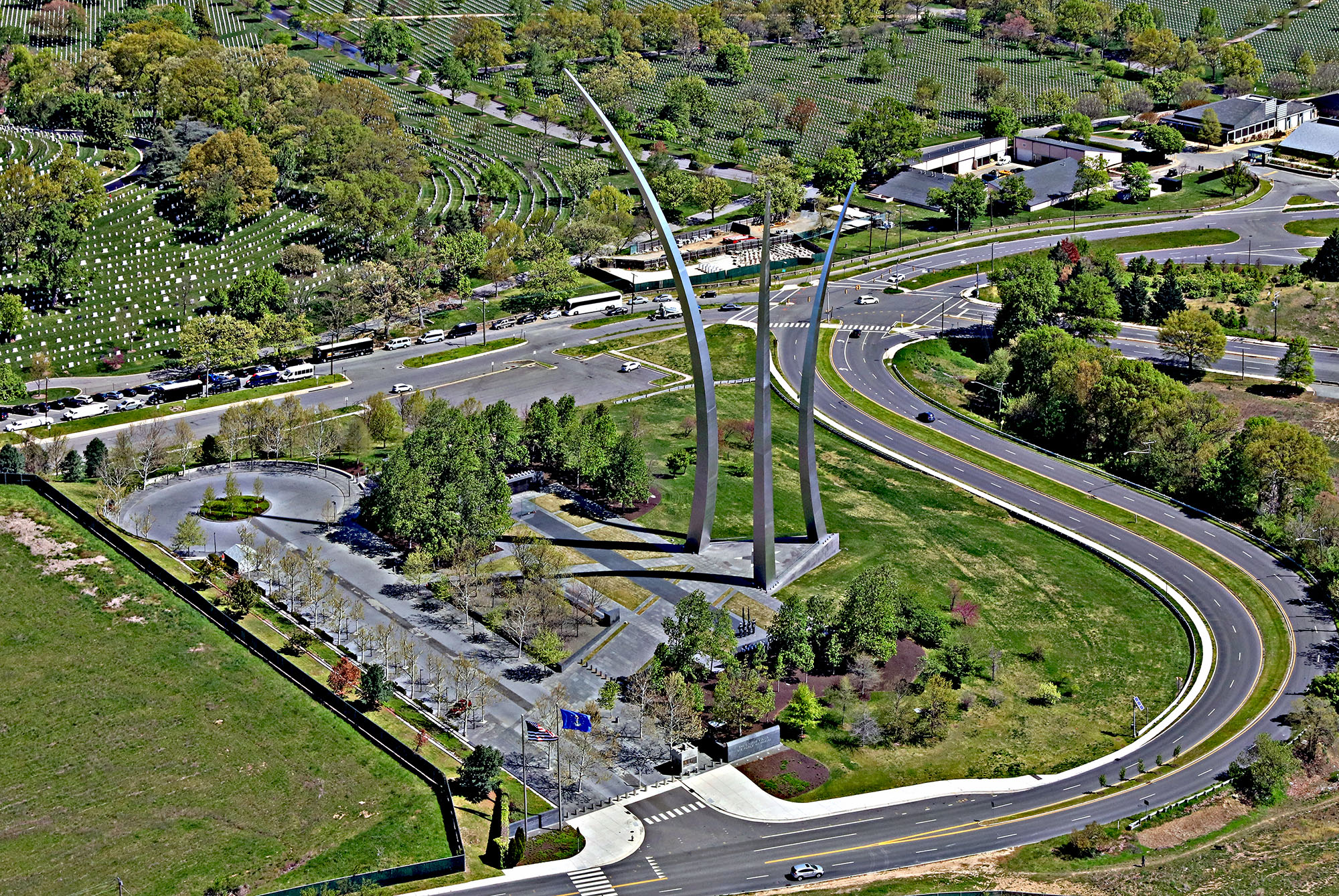
United States Air Force Memorial, Looking NE

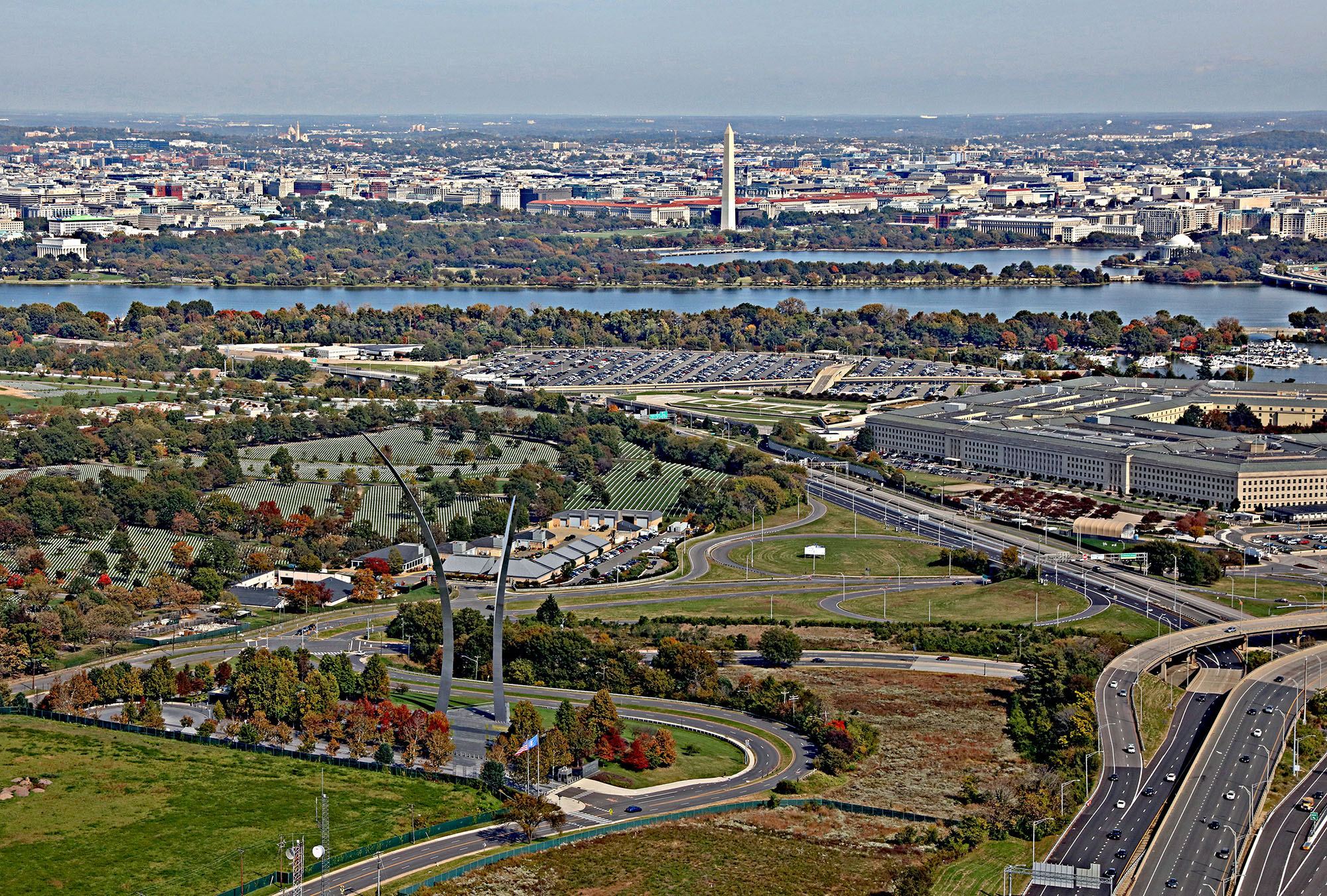
United States Air Force Memorial, Looking NE

== Events ==
Since the transfer to Air Force District of Washington, the Memorial has ceased the majority of their event services for Airmen.

== See also ==
- National Museum of the United States Air Force
