= Penrose Historic District =

Historic district in Virginia, United States

- U.S. National Register of Historic Places
- U.S. Historic district
- Virginia Landmarks Register
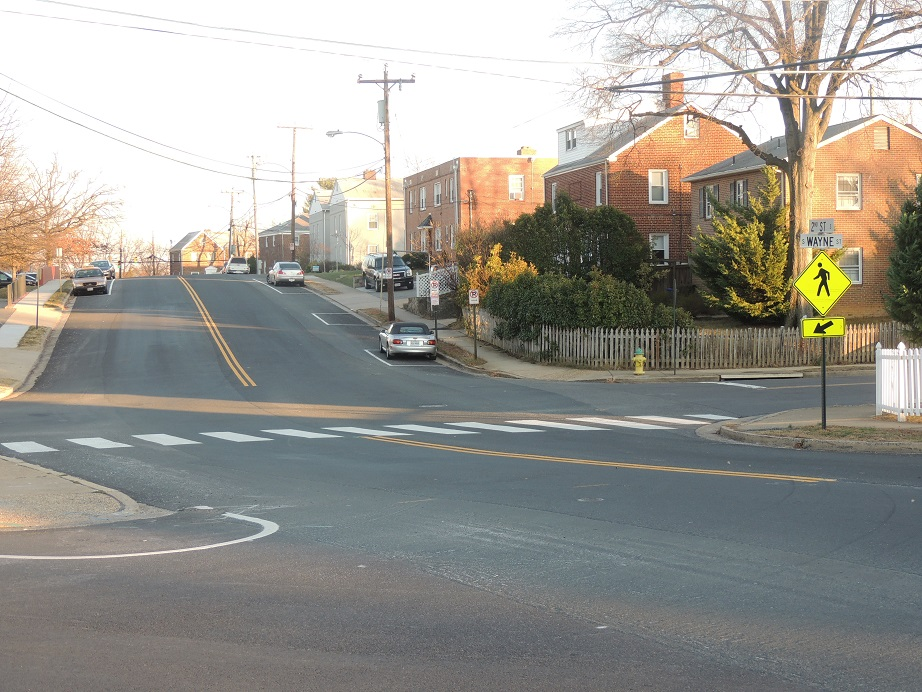
- A Penrose streetscape

- Location within District of Columbia Location within Virginia Location within the United States
- Location: Roughly bounded by Arlington Blvd., S. Courthouse Rd., S. Fillmore St., S. Barton St. S, and Columbia Pike, Arlington, Virginia
- Coordinates: 38°52′07″N 77°5′8″W
- Area: 125 acres (51 ha)
- Built: 1882-1943
- Architectural style: Late Victorian, Late 19th And 20th Century Revivals
- NRHP reference No.: 04000112
- VLR No.: 000-8823

Significant dates
- Added to NRHP: November 15, 2004
- Designated VLR: December 3, 2003

The Penrose Historic District is a national historic district located at Arlington County, Virginia within the Penrose, Arlington, Virginia neighborhood. It contains 486 contributing buildings, 2 contributing sites, and 2 contributing object in a residential neighborhood in South Arlington. The area was created with the integration of 12 distinct subdivisions platted between 1882 and 1943. The dwelling styles include the late-19th and early-20th-century vernacular, Queen Anne, Italianate, and Colonial Revival farm dwellings. A notable number of these dwellings are prefabricated kit or mail-order houses.

It was listed on the National Register of Historic Places in 2004.
