= Lyon Park Historic District =

Historic district in Virginia, United States

- U.S. National Register of Historic Places
- U.S. Historic district
- Virginia Landmarks Register
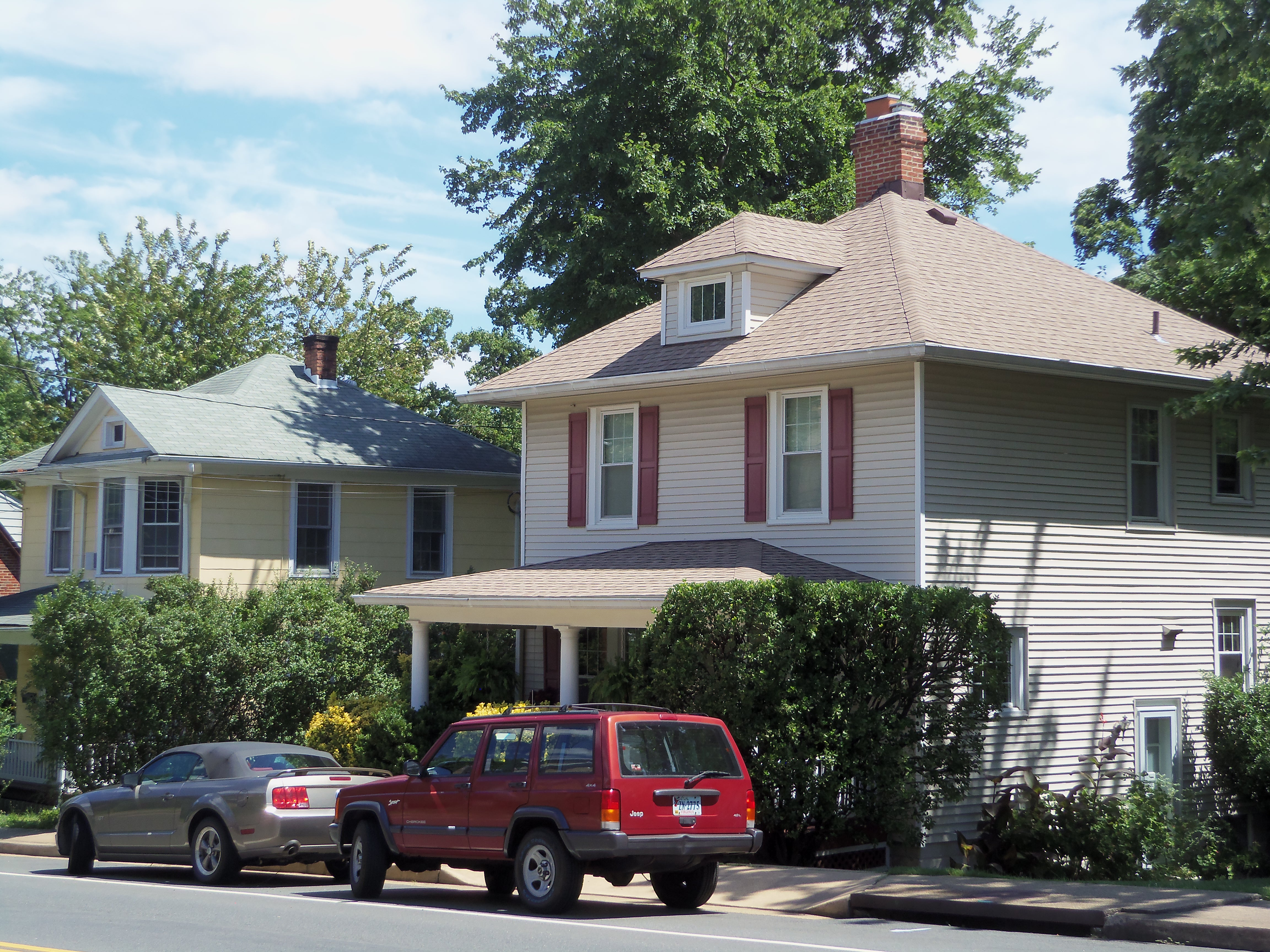

- Location within District of Columbia Location within Northern Virginia Location within Virginia Location within the United States
- Location: Roughly bounded by 10th St. N, Arlington Blvd., and N. Irving St., Arlington, Virginia
- Coordinates: 38°52′45″N 77°5′26″W
- Area: 284.4 acres (115.1 ha)
- Built: 1919
- Architect: Lyon, Frank; Sunderland, Walter, et al.
- Architectural style: Queen Anne, Colonial Revival, et al.
- NRHP reference No.: 03000437
- VLR No.: 000-7820

Significant dates
- Added to NRHP: November 12, 2003
- Designated VLR: May 19, 2003, March 10, 2008

The Lyon Park Historic District is a national historic district and upper-class neighborhood located in Arlington County, Virginia. It contains 1,165 contributing buildings and 1 contributing site in a residential neighborhood in North Arlington. The area was platted between 1919 and 1951. The dwelling styles include a variety of architectural styles, ranging from Craftsman-style bungalows dating from the 1920s to Colonial Revival-style buildings dating from the 1930s and 1940s. A number of Queen Anne style dwellings erected prior to the platting of Lyon Park are also present. It was developed by Frank Lyon.

It was listed on the National Register of Historic Places in 2003.
