= Columbia Pike–Pentagon Line =

Washington Metro bus lines/ routes

F44
- Columbia Pike–Pentagon Line

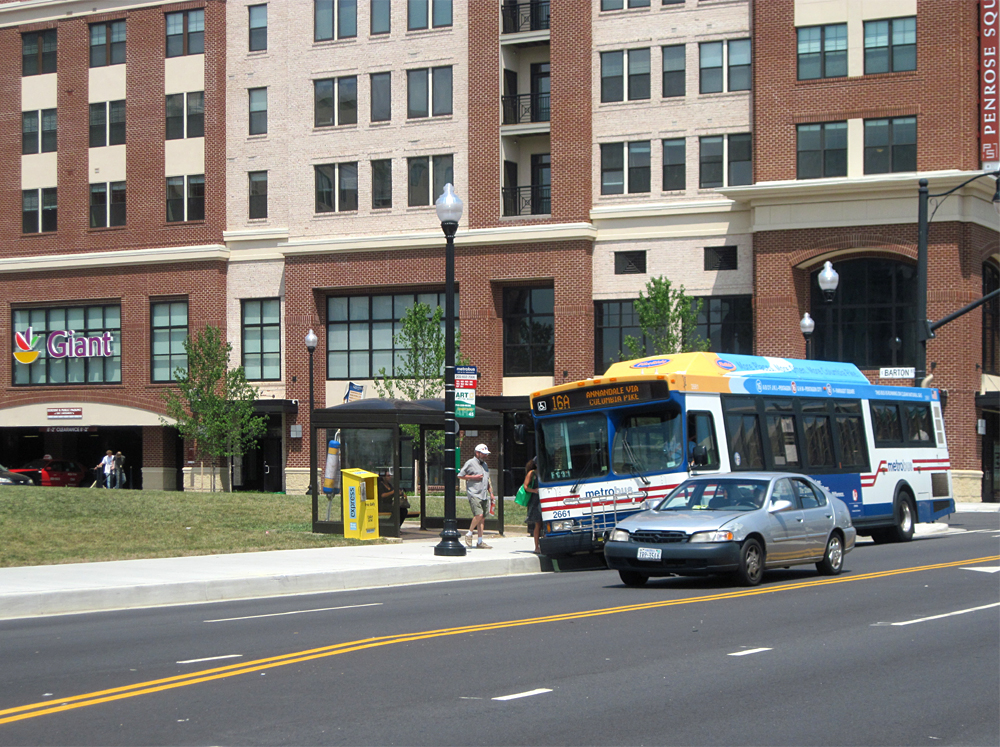
- An unrehabbed 2006 Orion VII CNG running on the 16A in 2010

Overview
- System: Metrobus
- Operator: Washington Metropolitan Area Transit Authority
- Garage: Four Mile Run
- Livery: Local
- Status: In Service
- Began service: 1921
- Ended service: 16D: March 29, 2015; 16B, 16J, & 16P: June 24, 2018; 16A, 16C, 16E: June 29, 2025

Route
- Locale: Fairfax County; Arlington County
- Communities served: Annandale, Sleepy Hollow, Lincolnia, Lake Barcroft, Bailey's Crossroads, Columbia Forest, Arlington Mill, Barcroft, Arlington Heights, Penrose, Pentagon City
- Landmarks served: Fashion Centre at Pentagon City, United States Air Force Memorial, Pentagon City station, Pentagon station
- Start: Annandale
- Via: Columbia Pike
- End: Pentagon station
- Other routes: A40 and A49

Service
- Level: Daily
- Frequency: 30 - 60 minutes
- Operates: 5:30 AM – 12:00 AM
- Ridership: 799,838 (16A, FY 2025); 439,661 (16C, FY 2025); 69,197 (16E, FY 2025)
- Transfers: SmarTrip only
- Timetable: Columbia Pike Line

The Columbia Pike–Pentagon Line, designated as Route F44, is a daily bus route operated by the Washington Metropolitan Area Transit Authority between the neighborhood of Annandale and Pentagon station of the Yellow and Blue lines of the Washington Metro. This line is part of the Pike Ride service, which runs through Columbia Pike. This line provides service to Annandale and the Pentagon Transit Center from the neighborhoods of Fairfax County and Arlington County. Alongside the neighborhoods, it also brings service through the marketplace, business, and offices through Columbia Pike.

== Route description and service ==
The F44 operate from Four Mile Run Division 7 days a week. Route F44 operates daily between the neighborhood of Annandale and Pentagon station, through the entire Columbia Pike route. The F44 also runs through other neighborhoods in Columbia Pike, such as Lincolnia, Bailey's Crossroads, Barcroft, Arlington Heights, and Penrose. The F44 provides local service to all stops in Columbia Pike through the entire route.

=== F44 stops ===
Bus stop	Direction	Connections
Arlington, Virginia
Pentagon Station Bus Bay U10	Eastbound Terminal, Westbound station	Arlington Transit: 42, 87, 87A, 87P, 87X; Metrobus: A11, A25, A27, A28, A90, F28, F29, F81, F83, F85; DASH: 35, 103, 104; Fairfax Connector: 306, 393, 394, 395, 599, 698, 834, 835; Loudoun County Transit; PRTC OmniRide; Washington Metro:
Army Navy Drive / South Eads Street	Westbound	Arlington Transit: 42, 87, 87A, 87P; Metrobus: A11
Army Navy Drive / South Fern Street	Westbound	Arlington Transit: 42, 87, 87A, 87P; Metrobus: A11
Army Navy Drive / South Hayes Street	Westbound	Arlington Transit: 42, 87, 87A, 87P; Metrobus: A11, A40
Army Navy Drive / South Joyce Street	Westbound	Arlington Transit: 42, 87, 87A, 87P; Metrobus: A11, A40
Columbia Pike / South Joyce Street	Bidirectional	Arlington Transit: 42; Metrobus: A40
Columbia Pike / United States Air Force Memorial	Bidirectional	Arlington Transit: 42; Metrobus: A40
Columbia Pike / South Orme Street	Bidirectional	Arlington Transit: 42; Metrobus: A40
Columbia Pike / South Rolfe Street	Westbound	Arlington Transit: 42; Metrobus: A40
Columbia Pike / South Scott Street	Bidirectional	Arlington Transit: 42; Metrobus: A40
Columbia Pike / South Courthouse Road	Bidirectional	Arlington Transit: 42, 45; Metrobus: A40
Columbia Pike / South Barton Street	Bidirectional	Arlington Transit: 45; Metrobus: A40, A49
Columbia Pike / Walter Reed Drive	Bidirectional	Arlington Transit: 45; Metrobus: A12, A40, A49
Columbia Pike / South Glebe Road	Bidirectional	Arlington Transit: 41, 45; Metrobus: A40, A49, A70
Columbia Pike / South Monroe Street	Eastbound	Arlington Transit: 41, 45; Metrobus: A40, A49
Columbia Pike / South Oakland Street	Bidirectional	Arlington Transit: 41; Metrobus: A40, A49
Columbia Pike / South Quincy Street	Bidirectional	Arlington Transit: 41; Metrobus: A40, A49
Columbia Pike / South George Mason Drive	Bidirectional	Arlington Transit: 41; Metrobus: A40, A49, A71
Columbia Pike / South Thomas Street	Bidirectional	Arlington Transit: 41; Metrobus: A40, A49, A71
Columbia Pike / South Buchanan Street (Westbound) / South Four Mile Run Drive (Eastbound)	Bidirectional	Arlington Transit: 41; Metrobus: A40, A49, A71
Columbia Pike / South Columbus Street (Westbound) / South Dinwiddie Street (Eastbound)	Bidirectional	Arlington Transit: 41, 45, 75; Metrobus: A40, A49
Columbia Pike / South Frederick Street	Bidirectional	Arlington Transit: 41, 45, 75; Metrobus: A40, A49
Columbia Pike / South Greenbrier Street	Bidirectional	Arlington Transit: 41, 45; Metrobus: A40, A49
Columbia Pike / South Jefferson Street	Bidirectional	Arlington Transit: 45; Metrobus: A40, A49
Bailey's Crossroads, Virginia
Columbia Pike / Carlin Springs Road	Bidirectional	Arlington Transit: 45; Metrobus: A49, A76, F20
Columbia Pike / Moray Lane	Bidirectional	Metrobus: A49, F20
Columbia Pike / Courtland Drive	Bidirectional	
Columbia Pike / Maple Court (Westbound) / Lacy Boulevard (Eastbound)	Bidirectional	
Columbia Pike / Barcroft View Terrace	Eastbound	
Columbia Pike / Blair Road (Westbound) / Madison Lane (Eastbound)	Bidirectional	Metrobus: F26
Columbia Pike / Marshall Drive (Westbound) / Powell Lane (Eastbound)	Bidirectional	Metrobus: F26
Lincolnia, Virginia
Columbia Pike / Aqua Terrace	Bidirectional	Metrobus: F26
Columbia Pike / Lakewood Drive (Westbound) / Braddock Road (Eastbound)	Bidirectional	Metrobus: F26
Columbia Pike / Ashwood Place	Bidirectional	Metrobus: F26
Columbia Pike / Lincolnia Road	Bidirectional	Metrobus: F26
Columbia Pike / Oxford Street	Bidirectional	Metrobus: F26
Columbia Pike / Downing Street	Bidirectional	Metrobus: F26
Columbia Pike / Maplewood Drive	Bidirectional	Metrobus: F26
Columbia Pike / Whispering Lane	Bidirectional	Metrobus: F26
Columbia Pike / Sleepy Hollow Road	Bidirectional	Metrobus: F26
Columbia Pike / Oak Hill Drive	Bidirectional	Metrobus: F26
Columbia Pike / Rose Lane	Bidirectional	Metrobus: F26
Annandale, Virginia
Columbia Pike / Gallows Road (Westbound) / Evergreen Lane (Eastbound)	Bidirectional	Metrobus: F26
John Marr Drive / Columbia Pike	Bidirectional	Metrobus: F26; Fairfax Connector: 401, 402
Little River Turnpike / Backlick Road	Bidirectional	Metrobus: F23, F24, F85; Fairfax Connector: 401, 402, 834
Little River Turnpike / Annandale Road (Westbound) / Ravensworth Road (Eastbound)	Bidirectional	Metrobus: F23, F24, F85; Fairfax Connector: 401, 402, 803, 834
Little River Turnpike / Medford Road	Bidirectional	Metrobus: F23, F24, F85; Fairfax Connector: 401, 402, 803, 834
Little River Turnpike / Woodland Road	Bidirectional	Metrobus: F23, F24, F85; Fairfax Connector: 401, 402, 803, 834
Americana Drive / Heritage Drive	Westbound	Metrobus: F26, F85; Fairfax Connector: 803
Patriot Drive / Americana Drive Annandale	Eastbound Stop, Westbound Terminal	Metrobus: F26, F85; Fairfax Connector: 803
Notes: 1. The route loops around the neighborhood of Annandale on Americana Drive and Patriot Drive.

== History ==
The line was part of the Pike Ride route since September 7, 2003. Before then, the line was known as the Columbia Pike Line. The Columbia Pike Line was part of the Alexandria, Barcroft and Washington Transit Company, which serves along the Columbia Pike. The line was AB&W’s first route, when it opened in 1921. It was later operated by WMATA in 1973, when it acquired all routes from the AB&W. From 1973 to 2025, the Columbia Pike Line consists of all 16 line. Some 16 routes were split into different lines, to run as a sister line which operates on the same road. The 16 line provides premium reliable service in Columbia Pike to connect from neighborhoods, to marketplaces, to landmarks, and to business. The Columbia Pike Line originally operated up to Washington Union Station until June 26, 1983 when all routes were shortened to Pentagon station.

After WMATA's success on the 16 line, Arlington Transit began adding more routes on the Columbia Pike, starting with Route 41. Routes 16B and 16J were the two routes that have a daily service, while routes 16A, 16D, and 16F operated only on weekdays. All routes, except 16F and 16J, runs between Pentagon station and Annandale. Route 16B runs between Pentagon station and the neighborhood of Culmore during weekday peak hours, while it extends to Annandale on the weekends. Route 16E operated during late nights, and is the only route which runs via Pentagon City. Route 16F runs during peak hours only, serving to Pentagon Station in the morning, and the neighborhood of Culmore in the afternoon. The 16F serves limited stops in Arlington County, and local stops in Bailey's Crossroads and Culmore.

In 2008, the 16P joins the Columbia Pike Line, taking over the 16J Sunday service. In 2009, the Sunday 16B reduced Annandale trips, leading to select trips terminating at Culmore, where it ends on weekday rush hours. In 2010, route 16F was renamed as the Columbia Pike–Federal Triangle Line. Other than route 16F, two existing route was formerly part of the Columbia Pike Line, until the line name was changed. Route 16L was part of the line until 1987, when it became the Columbia Pike Express Line. The 16L completely changed the line name to Annandale–Skyline City–Pentagon Line, although it remains connections to route 16A. Route 16G was also part of the Columbia Pike Line, until September, 2003, when the Pike Ride project began. Route 16G was selected to serve to Pentagon City Station, to form the Columbia Pike–Pentagon City Line. Route 16C is the only route in which WMATA used it twice. The old 16C operates on the Columbia Pike Route, until it was discontinued in 2003. After 15 years of absence, WMATA reincarnated the 16C back in the Columbia Pike Line in 2018, with modifications from the old 16C route.

=== Service changes ===
The Columbia Pike Line began on multiple service changes throughout the entire service, starting with the name change of the 16L line to the Columbia Pike Express Line. However, some 16 line routes faced some service changes throughout time.

Due to the September 11 attacks, the 16 line along with other bus lines that usually serves Pentagon station were rerouted temporarily to Pentagon City station due to security concerns at the Pentagon. Service to Pentagon station would resume on December 16, 2001.

Route 16C was discontinued from the Columbia Pike Line service on September 7, 2003. Routes 16B, 16F, and 16J absorbed the remaining portions of the 16C. Route 16F became a limited stop service within Arlington County. Route 16G was transferred to the Columbia Pike–Pentagon City Line to serve Pentagon City Station. Route 16G formed the new line, along with Routes 16H, 16K, and 16W to bring more service from the neighborhoods of Skyline City in Fairfax County, and Barcroft in Arlington County.

In 2010 during WMATA's FY2011 budget, WMATA proposed to modify the 16 line with some changes:

The 16 A, B, D, J, P was proposed to reroute off-peak trips, and to serve via Pentagon City station. With these changes, it was planned to rename the off-peak routes as the 16C, and the 16M, while WMATA will continue with the 16P.

The 16F was proposed options to extend its weekday peak service to Downtown in Washington D.C. The proposed 16F extension is expected to replace routes 13A and 13B from the National Airport–Pentagon–Washington Line.

Route 16F was transferred to the Columbia Pike–Federal Triangle Line, and extended to Federal Triangle in Washington D.C. After serving time with the Columbia Pike line, 16F times remains unchanged, and continues to serve limited stop in Arlington County, and serves all stops in Washington D.C. This route continues to operate until 2012, when it was renamed to route 16X.

Route 16D was discontinued on March 29, 2015, and is replaced by route 16A. Route 16L absorbed the Annandale portion of the 16D, where it ran.

On December 18, 2016, route 16E was extended from Pentagon station to Franklin Square in Downtown Washington D.C. due to earlier closures from Metrorail.

The Columbia Pike Line began to be rerouted by simplifying various routes into a single route. Routes 16B, 16J, 16P was discontinued on June 24, 2018, and replaced by 16A, 16C, and 16E. Route 16H from the Columbia Pike–Pentagon City Line also took over a portion of routes 16B, 16J, and 16P. Alongside of these changes, daily service was added to the 16A. Route 16C was brought back into the Columbia Pike Line service, after a 15-year hiatus, while other 16 line routes took over the old 16C. Route 16C also replaced the 16X from the Columbia Pike–Federal Triangle Limited Line, which operated up to Federal Triangle in Washington D.C. By bringing more reliable and faster service, the 16A & 16C serves limited stops on Columbia Pike in Arlington County. Routes 16E, 16G & 16H continues to serve to all stops on Columbia Pike in Arlington County.

During the COVID-19 pandemic, the line was reduced to operate on its Saturday Supplemental Schedule, with 16C service to Federal Triangle being suspended. The line began operating on its Sunday service on March 18, 2020. Weekend service was also reduced to operate every 30 minutes on the 16C with the 16A and 16E weekend service being suspended. Full service was restored on August 23, 2020, however 16C service to Federal Triangle remained suspended.

During WMATAs 2021 Fiscal Year budget, it was proposed to eliminate route 16C towards Downtown DC to reduce redundancy with the Blue and Yellow Lines and to fully eliminate route 16E which will be replaced by restored late-night Metrorail service.

On September 10, 2020 as part of its FY2022 proposed budget, WMATA proposed to truncate route 16C service from Downtown DC to Pentagon station, to reduce costs and low federal funds. It was also proposed to reduce weekend service on all routes of this line. Weeknight 16E service is unaffected, however, all 16E trips after midnight is proposed to be eliminated. Route 16C has not operated to Federal Triangle since March 13, 2020 due to Metro's response to the COVID-19 pandemic.

On September 5, 2021, the line was increased to operate every 12 minutes alongside the 16G and 16H daily between 7AM and 9PM. However 16C service to Federal Triangle was essentially discontinued.

Due to rising cases of the COVID-19 Omicron variant, the line was reduced to its Saturday service on weekdays. Full weekday service resumed on February 7, 2022.

As part of WMATA's Better Bus Redesign beginning on June 29, 2025, the line was changed completely. The 16A was renamed into the F44 operating mostly the same as its former 16A counterpart, but the limited-stop portion along Columbia Pike was eliminated. The 16C and 16E were combined with the 16M and renamed the A40. Service to Culmore was replaced by Routes A49 (a modified version of the former 16Y) and A66 (a modified version of the former 16C and 16E).
