= Columbia Pike–National Landing Line =

Bus route

A40
- Columbia Pike–National Landing Line

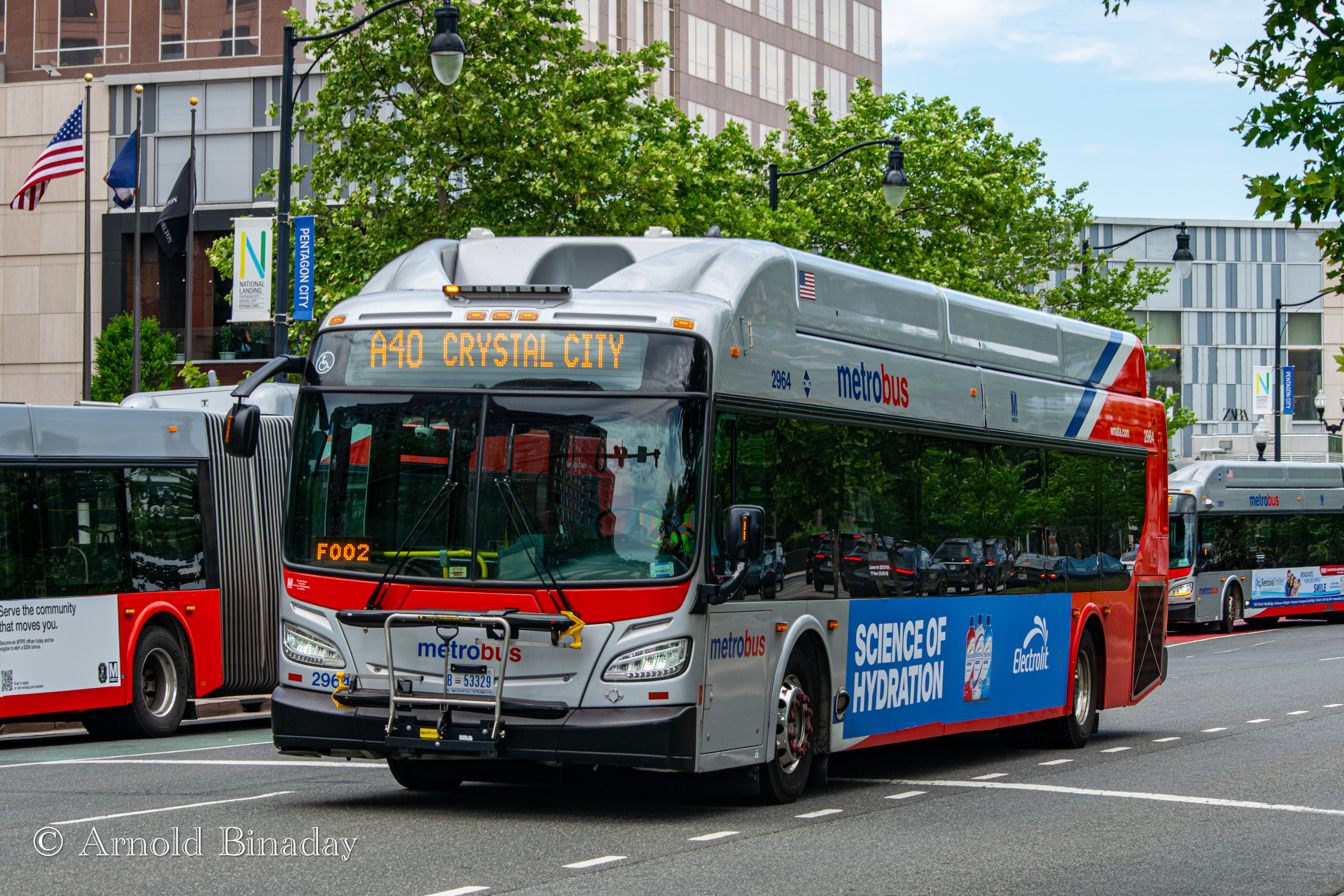
- Route A40 at Pentagon City

Overview
- System: Metrobus
- Operator: Washington Metropolitan Area Transit Authority
- Garage: Four Mile Run
- Livery: Local
- Status: In Service
- Began service: September 7, 2003
- Predecessors: 16G, 16H (before June 24, 2023); 16M (2023–2025)

Route
- Locale: Fairfax County; Arlington County, Southwest
- Communities served: Skyline City, Bailey's Crossroads, Columbia Forest, Arlington Mill, Barcroft, Arlington Heights, Penrose, Pentagon City, Crystal City, Southwest Waterfront
- Landmarks served: United States Air Force Memorial, Fashion Centre at Pentagon City, Pentagon City station, Crystal City station, The Wharf (Late night only), L'Enfant Plaza station (Late night only)
- Start: Skyline City
- Via: Columbia Pike
- End: Crystal City station L'Enfant Plaza station (Late night only)
- Other routes: F44 and A49

Service
- Level: Daily
- Frequency: 6 Minutes (Weekday Peak); 12 Minutes (Off Peak and Weekends, Until 9PM); 20 - 30 Minutes (After 9PM)
- Operates: 5:20 AM – 1:55 AM
- Ridership: 1,343,492 (FY 2025)
- Transfers: SmarTrip only
- Timetable: Columbia Pike–National Landing Line

The Columbia Pike–National Landing Line, designated as Route A40, is a daily bus route operated by the Washington Metropolitan Area Transit Authority between Skyline City and Crystal City station of the Yellow and Blue lines of the Washington Metro, with late night trips extending to L'Enfant Plaza station of the Blue, Yellow, Orange, Silver and Green Lines of the Washington Metro. This line is part of the Pike Ride service, which runs through Columbia Pike. This line provides service through the neighborhoods of Fairfax County and Arlington County to Crystal City.

== Route description and service ==
The A40 operates daily from Four Mile Run Division. Route A40 operates between Skyline City and Crystal City station, providing local stops through Columbia Pike. The A40 also runs through other neighborhoods in Columbia Pike, such as Barcroft, Arlington Heights, and Penrose, including a portion of Leesburg Pike to expand service to the marketplace of Skyline City. In addition, The A40 extends through Washington D.C., by operating up to L'Enfant Plaza station during the late nights only. The name of National Landing comes from joining parts of the Crystal City and Pentagon City neighborhoods, alongside the location of the Amazon HQ2 headquarters.

=== A40 stops ===
Bus stop	Direction	Connections
Washington, D.C.
D Street SW / 6th Street SW L'Enfant Plaza station	Westbound stop, Eastbound terminal	Metrobus: C11, C55, D30, D40, D50, D60; MTA Maryland Commuter Bus; Loudoun County Transit; PRTC OmniRide; Ride Smart Northern Shenandoah Valley; Washington Metro:
7th Street SW / E Street SW	Westbound	Metrobus: C11, C55, D30, D40, D50, D60
7th Street SW / G Street SW	Westbound	Metrobus: C11, C55, D50
7th Street SW / I Street SW	Bidirectional	Metrobus: C11, C55, D50
Maine Avenue SW / 9th Street SW	Bidirectional	Metrobus: D50
12th Street SW / D Street SW	Westbound	Metrobus: D50
12th Street SW / C Street SW	Eastbound	Metrobus: D50
Arlington, Virginia
Crystal City station Bus Bays B and E	Bidirectional (Late Night Only); Westbound stop, Eastbound terminal	Arlington Transit: 43; Metrobus: A1X; DASH: 35, 103, 104; Fairfax Connector: 598, 599; PRTC OmniRide; Loudoun County Transit; Washington Metro: VRE at Crystal City
Crystal Drive / 18th Street South	Eastbound	Arlington Transit: 43; Metrobus: A1X
15th Street South / South Eads Street	Westbound	Metrobus: A11, A27, A66
15th Street South / South Fern Street	Bidirectional	Metrobus: A11, A27, A66
15th Street South / South Grant Street	Westbound	Metrobus: A11, A27, A66
Pentagon City station Bus Bay B	Westbound	Arlington Transit: 42, 74, 84, 87; Metrobus: A11, A1X, A27, A66; Washington Metro:
South Hayes Street / 12th Street South Pentagon City station	Eastbound	Arlington Transit: 42, 74, 84, 87; Metrobus: A11, A1X, A27, A66; Washington Metro:
Army Navy Drive / South Hayes Street	Bidirectional	Arlington Transit: 42, 87, 87A, 87P; Metrobus: A11, F44
Army Navy Drive / South Joyce Street	Bidirectional	Arlington Transit: 42, 87, 87A, 87P; Metrobus: A11, F44
Columbia Pike / South Joyce Street	Bidirectional	Arlington Transit: 42; Metrobus: F44
Columbia Pike / United States Air Force Memorial	Bidirectional	Arlington Transit: 42; Metrobus: F44
Columbia Pike / South Orme Street	Bidirectional	Arlington Transit: 42; Metrobus: F44
Columbia Pike / South Rolfe Street	Westbound	Arlington Transit: 42; Metrobus: F44
Columbia Pike / South Scott Street	Bidirectional	Arlington Transit: 42; Metrobus: F44
Columbia Pike / South Courthouse Road	Bidirectional	Arlington Transit: 42, 45; Metrobus: F44
Columbia Pike / South Barton Street	Bidirectional	Arlington Transit: 45; Metrobus: A49, F44
Columbia Pike / Walter Reed Drive	Bidirectional	Arlington Transit: 45; Metrobus: A12, A49, F44
Columbia Pike / South Glebe Road	Bidirectional	Arlington Transit: 41, 45; Metrobus: A49, A70, F44
Columbia Pike / South Monroe Street	Bidirectional	Arlington Transit: 41, 45; Metrobus: A49, F44
Columbia Pike / South Oakland Street	Bidirectional	Arlington Transit: 41; Metrobus: A49, F44
Columbia Pike / South Quincy Street	Bidirectional	Arlington Transit: 41; Metrobus: A49, F44
Columbia Pike / South George Mason Drive	Bidirectional	Arlington Transit: 41; Metrobus: A49, A71, F44
Columbia Pike / South Thomas Street	Bidirectional	Arlington Transit: 41; Metrobus: A49, A71, F44
Columbia Pike / South Buchanan Street (Westbound) / South Four Mile Run Drive (Eastbound)	Bidirectional	Arlington Transit: 41; Metrobus: A49, A71, F44
Columbia Pike / South Columbus Street (Westbound) / South Dinwiddie Street (Eastbound)	Bidirectional	Arlington Transit: 41, 45, 75; Metrobus: A49, F44
Columbia Pike / South Frederick Street	Bidirectional	Arlington Transit: 41, 45, 75; Metrobus: A49, F44
Columbia Pike / South Greenbrier Street	Bidirectional	Arlington Transit: 41, 45; Metrobus: A49, F44
Columbia Pike / South Jefferson Street	Eastbound	Arlington Transit: 45; Metrobus: A49, F44
South Jefferson Street / Columbia Pike	Westbound	Arlington Transit: 45; Metrobus: A49, F44
Bailey's Crossroads, Virginia
South Jefferson Street / #1075	Eastbound	
South Jefferson Street / #3440	Westbound	
South Jefferson Street / Leesburg Pike	Bidirectional	
Leesburg Pike / Leesburg Court	Westbound	Metrobus: A76
Leesburg Pike / South George Mason Drive	Westbound	Metrobus: A76
South George Mason Drive / Seminary Road	Westbound	Metrobus: A76
Seminary Road / Magnolia Lane Skyline City	Eastbound stop, Westbound terminal	Metrobus: F20
Notes: 1. The route loops around the neighborhood of Skyline City on South George Mason Drive and Seminary Road.

== History ==
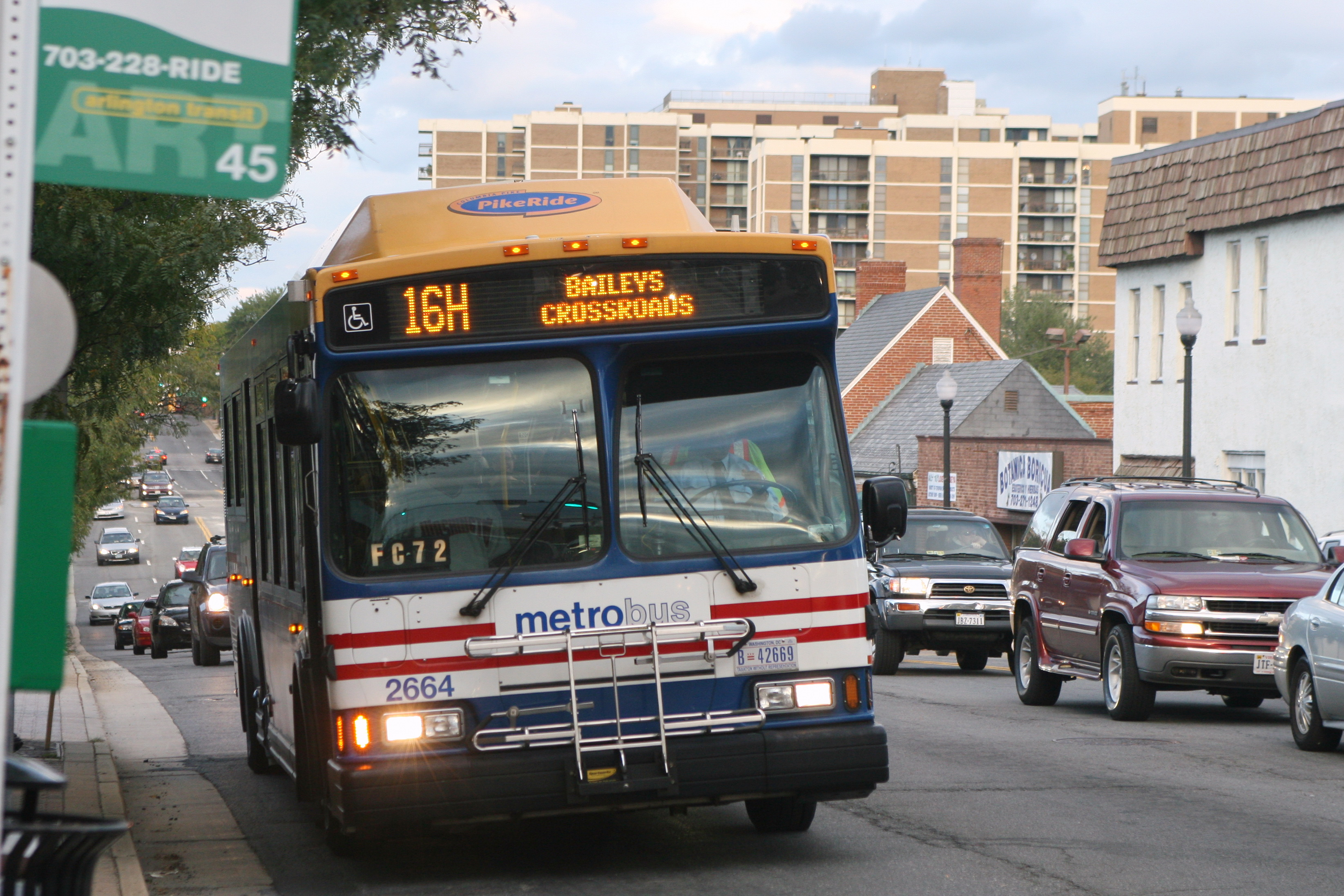
Former Route 16G running to Bailey's Crossroads in 2010

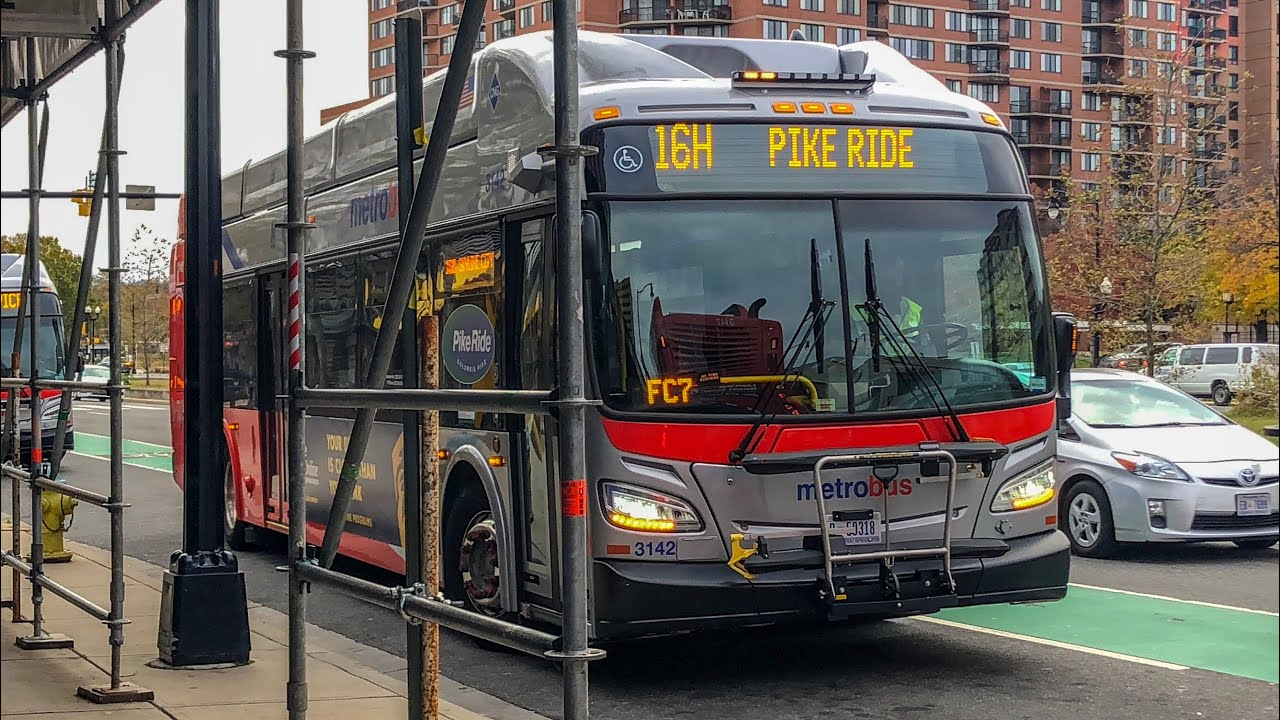
Former Route 16H at Pentagon City in 2018

The Columbia Pike–National Landing Line was introduced in 2023, as route 16M during the simplification of the line. The line was part of the Pike Ride route since September 7, 2003 as the 16G, 16H, 16K, and 16W. During the creation of the Pike Ride Transit Service, this line was formally known as the Columbia Heights West–Pentagon City Line. These routes runs between Pentagon City Station and the neighborhood of Arlington Mill. Although WMATA recognized the neighborhood as Columbia Heights West, instead of Arlington Mill. Route 16G operated daily, while Routes 16H and 16W operated during peak hours, and Route 16K operates during the weekend. Route 16K does not serve Pentagon City Station, but serves Pentagon station instead. This line replaced routes 16S, 16U, and 16X from the Shirlington–Pentagon Line, while 16W continued to run. Route 16G was initially part of the Columbia Pike Line, until 2003 when it was rerouted as part of the Pike Ride project. Route 16H operates between the neighborhood of Barcroft, and Pentagon City station. Route 16H brings local stops west of the neighborhood of Penrose, where the 16Y serves. Route 16W serves up to Skyline City, via South Four Mile Run Drive and South George Mason Drive.

In 2005, route 16H was extended to run between Crystal City Station and Bailey's Crossroads. The Four Mile Run segment was discontinued, and route 16W continues to serve Skyline City via South George Mason Drive. Route 16W was fully discontinued in 2010, as the route was taken over from route 16H in 2010. The Crystal City Segment was permanently discontinued from the line, when Metroway, WMATA's bus rapid transit, extended to Pentagon City in 2016.

The line was renamed to Columbia Pike–Pentagon City Line in 2018, after confusion with the neighborhood of Columbia Heights West, as there is the neighborhood of Columbia Heights in Washington D.C., along with Columbia Heights Station that serves the Yellow and Green lines of the Washington Metro. Since the 16G, and 16H does not go to Washington D.C., the 16G westbound was renamed to Arlington Mill, the actual name of the neighborhood of Arlington County.

Route 16H extended to Crystal City station and Bailey's Crossroads on September 25, 2005. The Four Mile Run segment was discontinued, and route 16W is rerouted to South George Mason Drive. The 16H continues to operate via Pentagon City Station.

In 2010 during WMATA's FY2011 budget, WMATA proposed to reconstruct the line.

Route 16G was proposed to extend to Pentagon station via Pentagon City station during weekday off-peak hours and Saturdays. Sunday 16G service was also proposed to be discontinued and to be replaced by the 16E and the 16P.

Route 16H was proposed in two options. The first option was to extend to Skyline City via Jefferson Street, Leesburg Pike and George Mason Drive to Seminary Road. The second option was to extend to Northern Virginia Community College (Alexandria Campus) via Jefferson Street and Leesburg Pike. If extended to NOVA Alexandria campus, the 16H will terminate at Dawes Avenue. From either both options, the 16H is also proposed to discontinue service between Pentagon City station and Crystal City station.

Routes 16W was proposed to be converted to the 16H, depending on one of the two options. Alternate service is provided by the 22A from the Barcroft–South Fairlington Line towards South George Mason Drive and South Four Mile Run Drive, and Arlington Transit route 75 towards South Frederick Street and South George Mason Drive.

Route 16W was fully discontinued from service on December 19, 2010. Route 16H was extended to Skyline City from Bailey's Crossroads, taking over the 16W Route.

In 2016 during WMATA's FY2018 budget, it was proposed to convert route 16G and 16K to route 16H to reduce costs, and to reduce redundancy to Arlington Transit routes. According to performance measure it goes as the following for WMATA:

Performance Measures	Route 16G, 16H, 16K	WMATA Guideline	Pass/Fail
Average Daily Riders	3,695	432	Pass
Cost Recovery	34.09%	16.6%	Pass
Subsidy per Rider	$2.26	$4.81	Pass
Riders per Trip	19.9	10.7	Pass
Riders per Revenue Mile	4.2	1.3	Pass

As the Metroway Bus Rapid Transit service continues to progress in Arlington, the 16H service between Pentagon City & Crystal City was discontinued. Route 16H stopped serving Crystal City on March 27, 2016, and truncated back to Pentagon City, where it originally ran, being replaced by Metroway, WMATA's bus rapid transit, extended to Pentagon City on March 27, 2016.

The Columbia Pike–Pentagon City Line began to modify service, by simplifying routes into different portions. Route 16K which served between the neighborhood of Arlington Mill and Pentagon Station was discontinued on June 24, 2018. Route 16G continued to operate through the neighborhood of Arlington Mill, alongside Arlington Transit routes 41, 45, and 75. Along with these changes, Route 16H began operating on weekends.

During WMATAs 2021 Fiscal Year budget, it was proposed to consolidate both routes 16G and 16H into one route with the 16G being replaced by 16H, and Arlington Transit routes 41, 45 and 75 as part of Arlington County countywide transit development plan. However WMATA later backed out the merger of the 16G and the 16H on April 2, 2020, retaining both routes as separate routes.

During the COVID-19 pandemic, the route began operating on its Saturday supplemental schedule beginning on March 16, 2020. However beginning on March 18, 2020, the route was further reduced to operate on its Sunday schedule . Also, beginning on March 21, 2020, weekend service was suspended being replaced by the 16C. Regular weekday and weekend service resumed beginning on August 23, 2020.

On September 5, 2021, the 16G and 16H was increased to operate every 12 minutes alongside the 16A, 16C, and 16E daily between 7AM and 9PM.

Due to rising cases of the COVID-19 Omicron variant, Routes 16G and 16H reduced to its Saturday service on weekdays. Full weekday service resumed on February 7, 2022.

Another proposal of bus consolidation came in during WMATAs 2024 Fiscal Year budget, when WMATA proposed to consolidate 16G and 16H, however, it would be extended to Crystal City and be renamed into Route 16M. These changes will restore the 16H route that was discontinued back in March 2016. Following the announcement of the 16M, beginning service on June 25, 2023, a ribbon-cutting ceremony, hosted by Arlington County, was held at the Arlington Mill Community Center as a start of the 16M bus service.

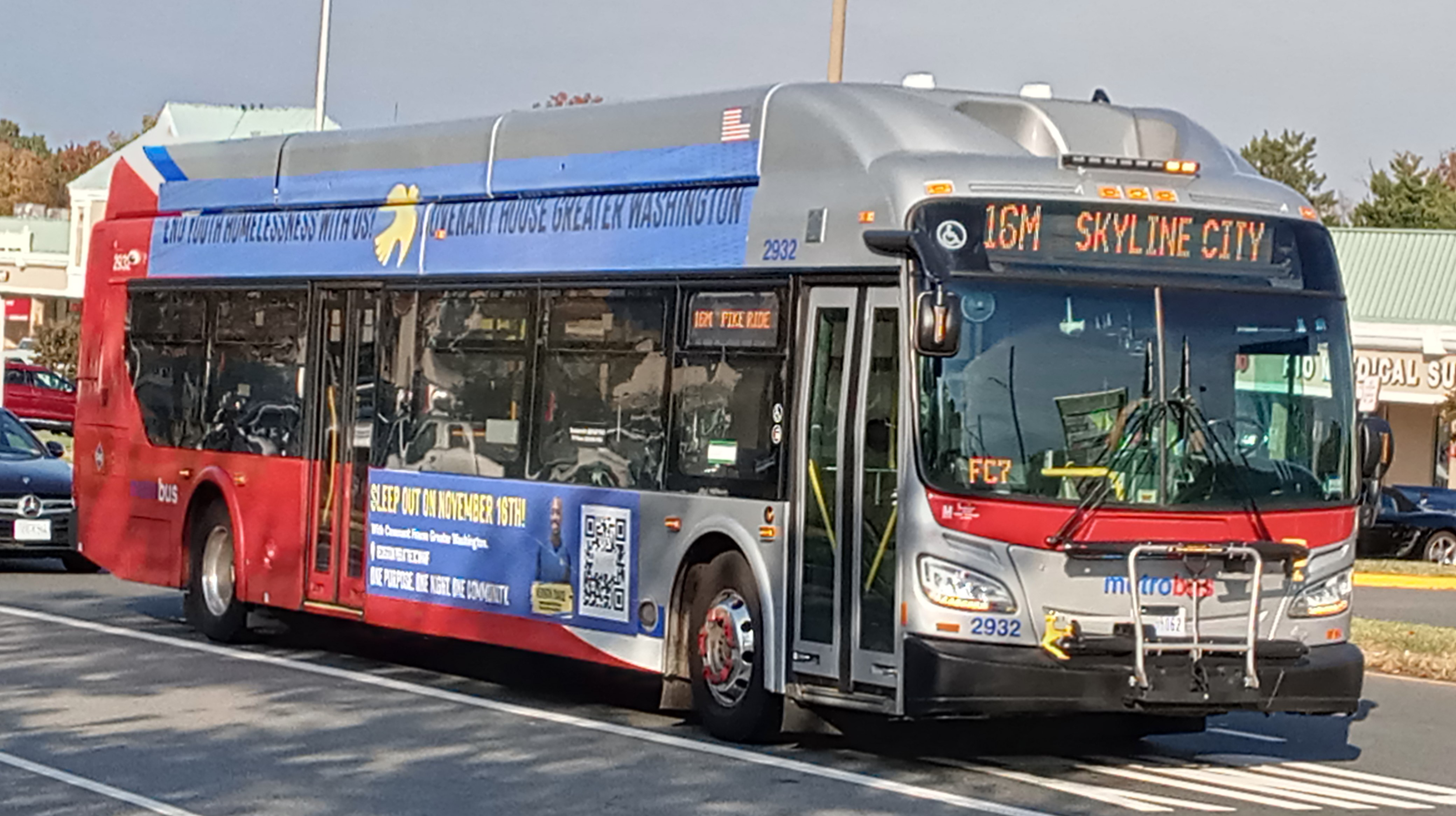
Former Route 16M in Skyline City in 2023

Route 16M was the first new line, after its formation in 2003, to be introduced to the Pike Ride corridor. This line was renamed to the Columbia Pike–National Landing Line as a result.

As part of WMATA's Better Bus Redesign beginning on June 29, 2025, the 16M was renamed into the A40, keeping the same routing. Between 11PM and 2AM, the line is partially combined with the 16E and is extended to L'Enfant Plaza station.
