= Columbia Pike–Metro Center Line =

Bus route

A49
- Columbia Pike–Metro Center Line

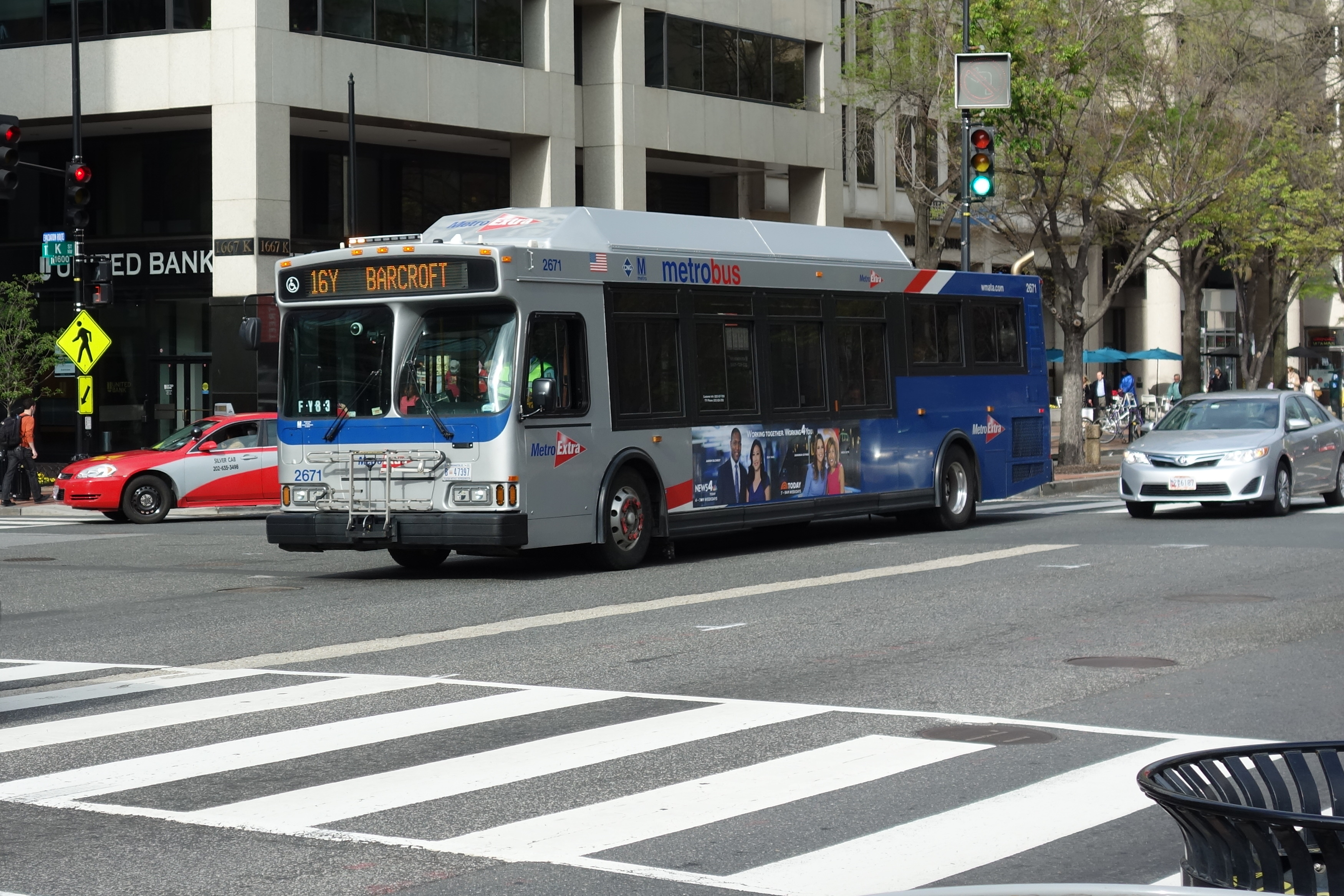
- Route 16Y along K Street in 2020.

Overview
- System: Metrobus
- Operator: Washington Metropolitan Area Transit Authority
- Garage: Four Mile Run
- Livery: Local
- Status: In Service
- Began service: September 29, 2002

Route
- Locale: Fairfax County; Arlington County; Northwest
- Communities served: Culmore, Bailey's Crossroads, Columbia Forest, Arlington Mill, Barcroft, Arlington Heights, Penrose, Lyon Park, Downtown
- Landmarks served: Farragut Square, Farragut North station, Farragut West station, Franklin Square, McPherson Square station
- Start: Culmore
- Via: Columbia Pike, Arlington Boulevard, K Street NW
- End: Metro Center station
- Other routes: F44 and A40

Service
- Level: Weekday Peak Hour Service Only
- Frequency: 20 Minutes
- Operates: 5:00 AM – 8:40 AM; 3:30 PM – 7:10 PM
- Ridership: 129,748 (FY 2025)
- Transfers: SmarTrip only
- Timetable: Columbia Pike–Metro Center Line

The Columbia Pike–Metro Center Line, designated Route A49, is a rush hour-only bus route operated by the Washington Metropolitan Area Transit Authority between the neighborhood of Culmore and Metro Center station of the Red, Blue, Orange, and Silver Lines of the Washington Metro. This line is part of the Pike Ride service, which runs through Columbia Pike. This line provides service to Culmore in Fairfax County, Virginia and Downtown Washington, D.C.

== Route description and service ==
The A49 operates from Four Mile Run Division every 20 minutes between 5:00 a.m. and 8:40 a.m. and 3:30 p.m. and 7:10 p.m. on weekdays. The route serves travel in both directions. The A49 operates between the neighborhood of Culmore and Metro Center station. The A49 joins the route on Columbia Pike through the intersection of Leesburg Pike. The A49 splits service from Columbia Pike to head towards Lyon Park from South Courthouse Road towards Arlington Boulevard (U.S. Route 50), all the way to D.C. via the Theodore Roosevelt Bridge.

== History ==
Route A49 began service on September 29, 2002, as Route 16Y, becoming the first bus route to run through Downtown D.C. since the opening of the Yellow Line in 1983. The 16Y was also created by WMATA to provide limited stop/express service between the neighborhood of Barcroft and McPherson Square station via Columbia Pike, Arlington Boulevard, and the Arlington Memorial Bridge. The original 16Y route serves limited stops on Columbia Pike between South Four Mile Run Drive, and South Courthouse road, until it runs non stop to Downtown, serving all stops until McPherson Square station. The 16Y serves Farragut Square Station, both the North and the West side, before arriving to McPherson Square.

The 16Y became part of the Pike Ride route in 2003, along with the other 16 lines. As part of the Pike Ride project, the 16Y brought in faster service during rush hours through Columbia Pike.

The 16Y became a MetroExtra route in 2012, along with route 16F (later 16X) of the Columbia Pike–Federal Triangle Line. This groups the 16Y, as a limited stop routes, while all other 16 lines are local routes which serves all stops in Columbia Pike. Along with the addition of MetroExtra Better Bus program, it brings more reliable service on the 16Y when more times was added throughout the years.

Starting on April 7, 2003, the 16Y added service to the Arlington County Department of Human Services (DHS)/Sequoia at South Courthouse Road and 2nd Street South. This stop became a "Boarding Only" during morning peak periods, and "Boarding and Alighting Only" during afternoon peak periods. From the addition of the stop, the 16Y eliminated the alighting only stop at the neighborhood of Penrose on Columbia Pike, as the 16Y will no longer run on Washington Boulevard, south of Walter Reed Drive.

The 16Y began to add more service through South Courthouse Road. The 16Y started to serve on the intersection of 6th Street South to bring more stops to the route. As the DHS/Sequoia stop at 2nd Street South is a Boarding Only stop on morning peak period, this new stop allows access to DHS/Sequoia by walking.

The 16Y began to add service through Lyon Park and Fort Myer near Arlington Boulevard, by adding more stops to bring more service on the 16Y. The DHS/Sequoia stop is no longer a Boarding Only stop on morning peak hours, after service on Washington Boulevard and Arlington Boulevard was added. Alongside these changes, the 16Y now operates near Fort Myer on Arlington Boulevard and North Pershing Drive. Unlike its original timetable, this stop is both Boarding and Alighting during peak hours.

All route 16Y service was suspended due to WMATA's response to the COVID-19 pandemic beginning on March 16, 2020.

On September 10, 2020 as part of its FY2022 proposed budget, WMATA proposed to eliminate route 16Y service in order to reduce costs and low federal funds. If this proposal succeeds, there will be no MetroExtra routes left in Virginia.

However WMATA announced to restore the 16Y line on September 5, 2021, due to frequency improvements in the Metrobus system. The restoration of the 16Y will resume operation as it was during the pre-pandemic levels, with additional peak trips for both directions, with new trips serving Barcroft during morning rush hours, and McPherson Square station during afternoon rush hours apart from the original peak directional trips.

As part of WMATA's Better Bus Redesign beginning on June 29, 2025, Route 16Y was extended to Culmore to replace the 16C and 16E and renamed into the A49, eliminating all limited-stops on the route.
