= Pike Ride =

Bus service in Virginia, United States

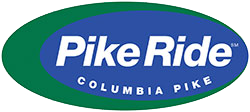

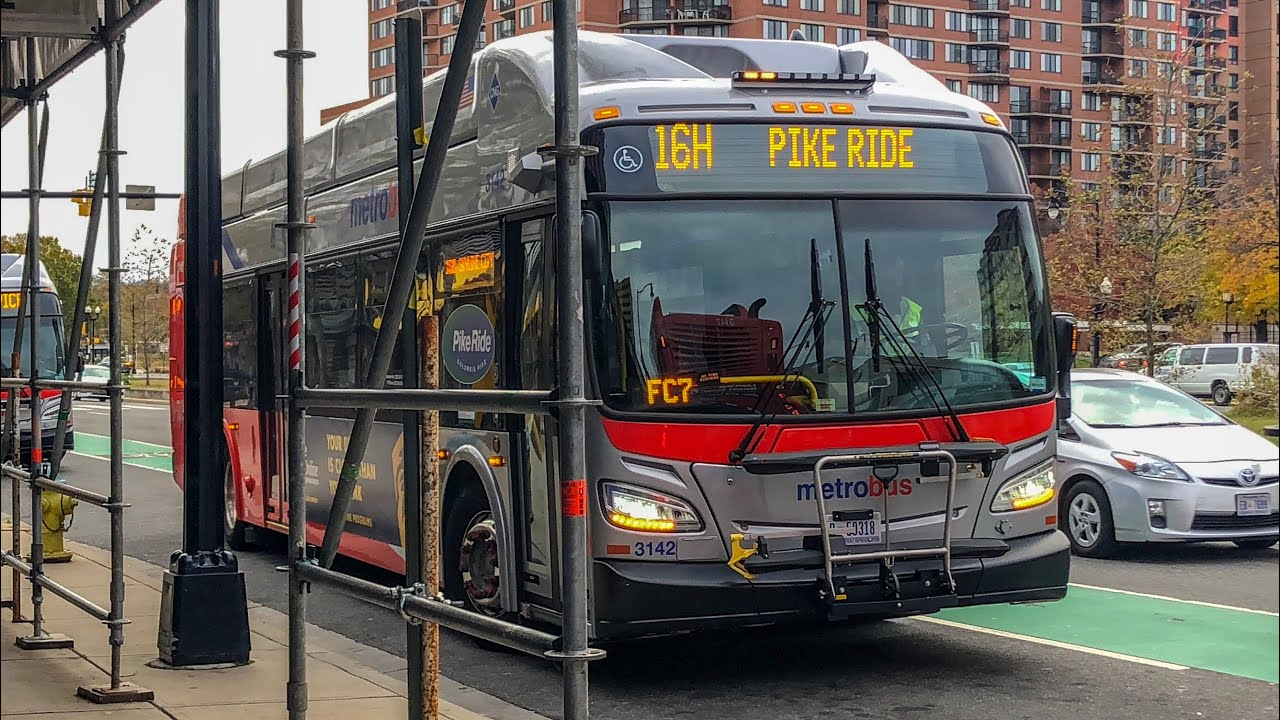
- Pike Ride-branded WMATA route 16H bus in 2018
- Founded: September 7, 2003
- Locale: Arlington County, Virginia; Annandale, Virginia
- Service area: Columbia Pike
- Routes: 8
- Stations: Pentagon Station, Pentagon City Station
- Daily ridership: 17,000 (January 2018 estimate)
- Operator: Metrobus; ART

Pike Ride is a combination of bus routes along Columbia Pike in Northern Virginia, United States. It consists of service operated by the Washington Metropolitan Area Transit Authority (Metrobus) and Arlington Transit (ART), connecting the Pentagon and Pentagon City Washington Metro stations in Arlington County with Annandale in Fairfax County.

The service started in 2003. Route timetables and other useful information were implemented in numerous bus stops along the corridor, printed in both English and Spanish. ART provides cell phone users with an 800 number that is listed at each bus stop to call and obtain bus schedule information.

== Routes ==
The following routes are branded as Pike Ride service:

Route	Terminals		Major streets	Operator	History	Notes
16A	Annandale (Patriot & Americana Drives)	Pentagon station	Little River Turnpike; Columbia Pike	WMATA	See Columbia Pike Line for history.	Daily Service; Limited stops in Arlington County
16C	Culmore (Glen Carlyn & Vista Drives)	Pentagon station	Columbia Pike	WMATA	See Columbia Pike Line for history.	Daily Service; Limited stops in Arlington County
16E	Culmore (Glen Carlyn & Vista Drives)	Franklin Square	Columbia Pike; 14th Street	WMATA	See Columbia Pike Line for history.	Late night service daily; Early morning service weekends only
16M	Skyline City (Seminary Rd & Magnolia La)	Crystal City station; L'Enfant Plaza station (late nights)	Columbia Pike	See Columbia Pike–National Landing Line for history.	Daily Service	
16Y	Barcroft (Four Mile Run Dr & Columbia Pike)	McPherson Square station	Columbia Pike; Arlington Boulevard; Roosevelt Bridge	See Columbia Pike–Farragut Square Line for history.	MetroExtra line; Weekday peak hour service only.	
41	Arlington Mill (Dinwiddie St & Columbia Pike)	Court House	Columbia Pike; Glebe Road	Arlington Transit		Daily Service
74	Arlington Village (Walter Reed Dr & Columbia Pike)	Pentagon City	Columbia Pike	Arlington Transit		Weekday peak hour service only (AM to Pentagon City, PM to Arlington Village)
75	Shirlington Station	Virginia Square-GMU Station	Columbia Pike; Carlin Springs Road	Arlington Transit		Weekday Service

== History ==
Robert L. May of Barcroft began operating buses along Columbia Pike in 1921, running from downtown Washington over the 14th Street Bridge to Barcroft. Among other additions, he acquired the former Washington, Alexandria and Mount Vernon Railway at foreclosure in 1930 and replaced it with buses in 1932. May incorporated the Alexandria, Barcroft and Washington Transit Company in 1934. This company continued independent operation until February 4, 1973, when WMATA acquired it.

== Improvements ==
Since 2003, some effort has been made to improve service along the corridor. In July 2016, the Arlington County Board approved a Transit Development Plan that includes enhanced bus service along Columbia Pike. There will be 23 enhanced bus stops, with BRT-like amenities like near-level boarding, real-time bus arrival information and off-vehicle fare collection. This proposal, called a Premium Transit Network, has since been delayed until 2019 due to Metro rebuilding efforts. The use of dedicated lanes for the corridor was studied by the country, but were deemed to be challenging and unlikely. The buses could have a distinctive appearance.
