= Arlington Transit =

Transit system in Arlington County, Virginia

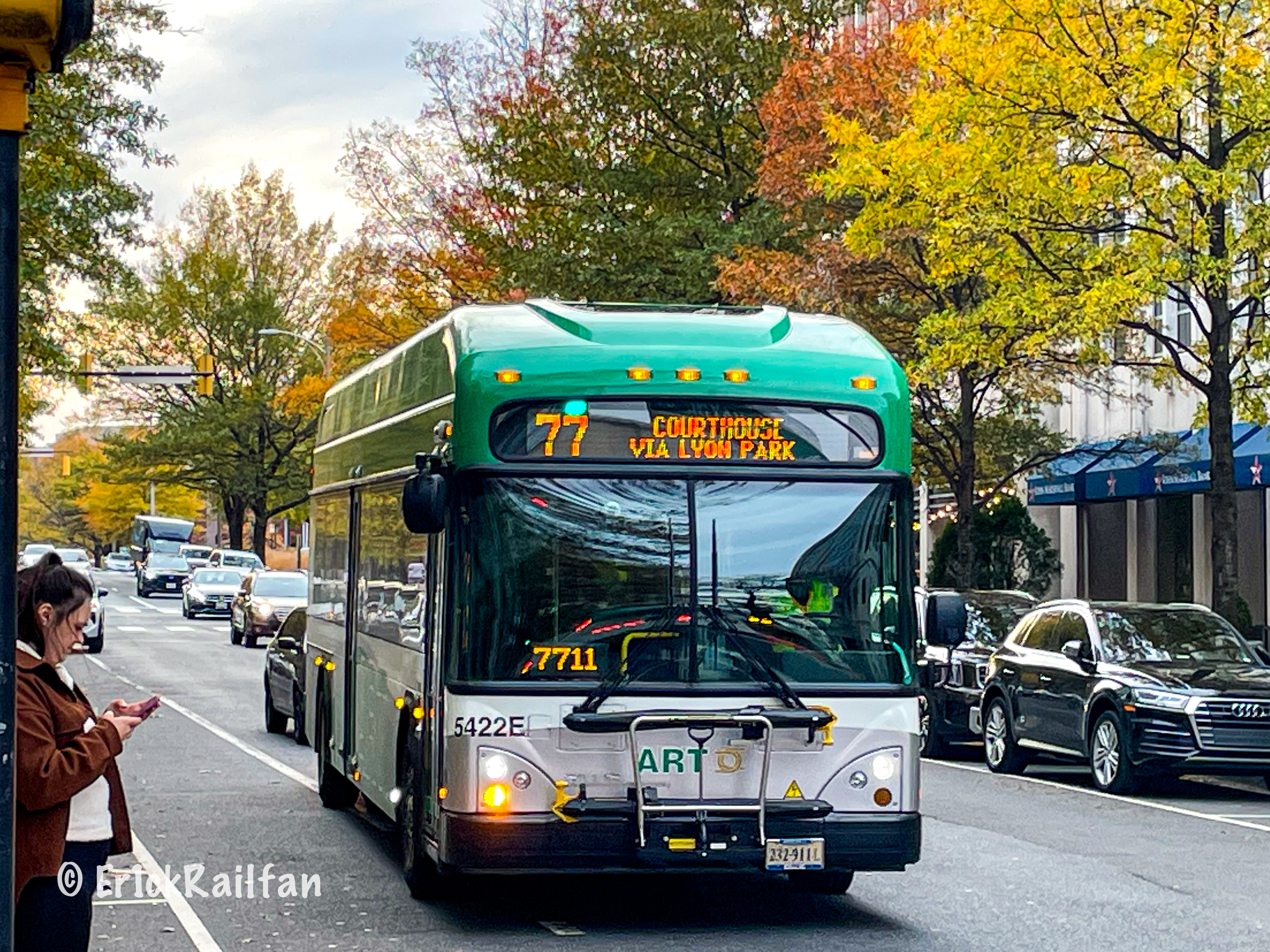
- A 2025 Gillig Low Floor Plus electric ART bus arriving at Court House station.
- Parent: Arlington County, Virginia, US
- Founded: November 1998
- Headquarters: 2100 Clarendon Boulevard; Arlington County, Virginia, US
- Service area: Arlington County, Virginia
- Service type: Bus
- Alliance: WMATA
- Routes: 14
- Stations: Shirlington Bus Station; Ballston–MU station
- Fleet: New Flyer; Gillig
- Daily ridership: 9,200 (weekdays, Q2 2026)
- Annual ridership: 2,789,200 (2025)
- Fuel type: CNG, Battery electric
- Operator: Transdev
- Website: arlingtontransit.com

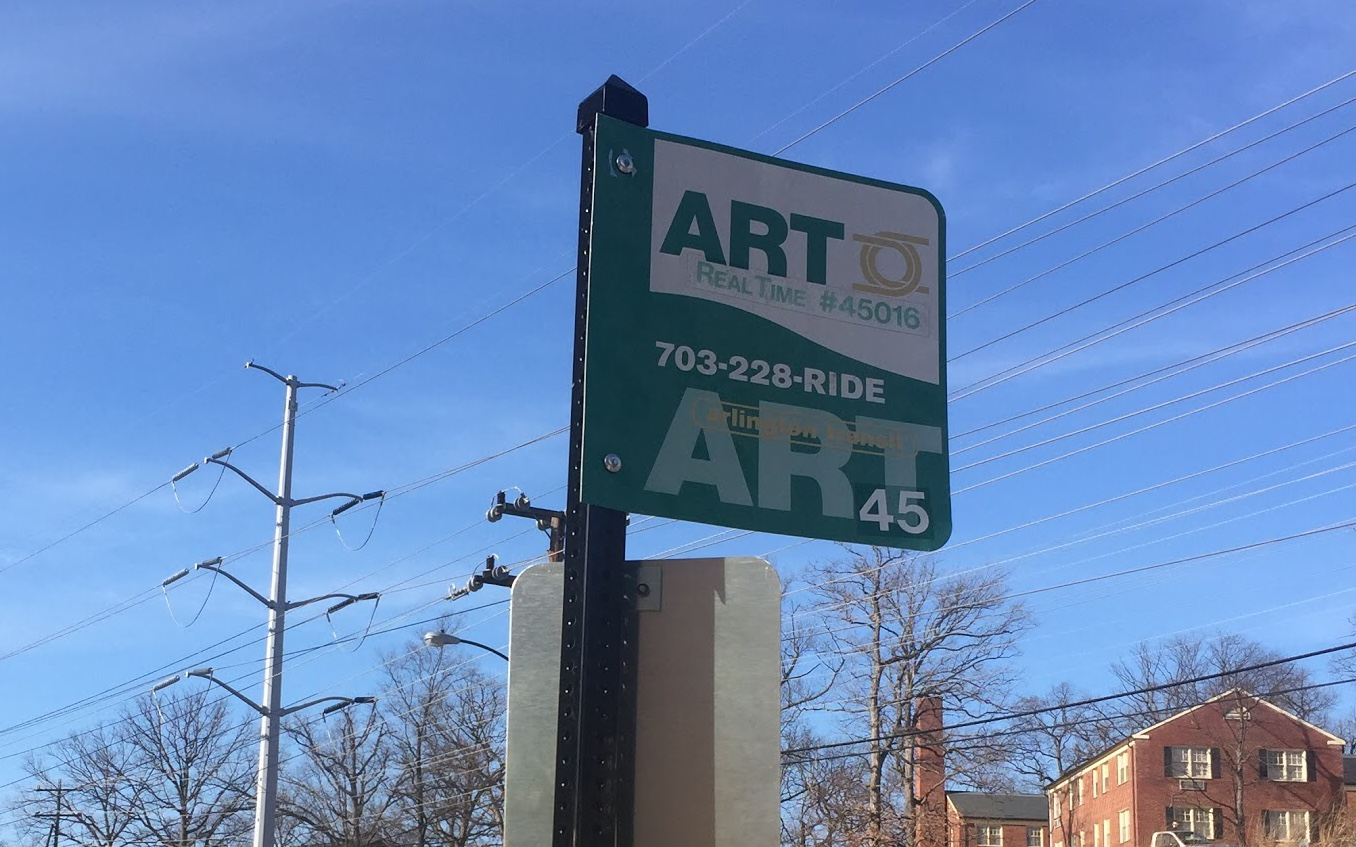
An Arlington Transit Bus Stop Sign at South Four Mile Run Drive.

Arlington Transit (ART) is a bus transit system that operates in Arlington County, Virginia, and is managed by the county government. The bus system provides service within Arlington County, and connects to Metrobus, nearby Metrorail stations, Virginia Railway Express, and other local bus systems. Most ART routes serve to connect county neighborhoods to local Metrorail stations, as well as the Shirlington Bus Station. It includes part of the Pike Ride service along Columbia Pike, which is shared with WMATA. In 2025, the system had a ridership of 2,789,200, or about 9,200 per weekday as of the second quarter of 2026.

ART is operated under contract by Transdev, previously First Transit, and has a fleet of 82 buses. The agency provides fixed-route service on fourteen routes within Arlington County, carrying nearly three million passengers annually. To meet the goals of the county's Arlington Initiative to Reduce Emissions (AIRE) project, the fleet utilizes compressed natural gas and battery electric buses.

== History ==
Before ART's inception, WMATA was the only transit agency that served Arlington County, providing both bus and rail service. Some Metrobus routes served the neighborhoods of Arlington County, connecting them to the Metrorail system. In November 1998, the Arlington County board created the ART service, as part of their effort to improve transportation in the county. ART's first route served Crystal City, while other routes were still operated by Metrobus.

On April 7, 2003, ART began providing Pike Ride routes by introducing ART Route 41. In September of that year, a new service was started along Columbia Pike, known as Pike Ride.

In 2006, ART began increasing service, both by acquiring Metrobus routes and by bringing service to more neighborhoods. Metrobus Route 24P was the first route to be converted to ART, as Route 42. In 2008, the Shirlington Bus Station, also known as the "Shirlington Transit Center", opened in The Village at Shirlington. The Shirlington Transit Center is located on Quincy Street and is located near Shirley Highway (I-395). With the opening of the new bus station, ART and Metrobus began using it as major transfer point. Shirlington Station connects most bus routes to nearby Metrorail stations, as well as the neighborhood of Fairlington. The next year, route 42 was expanded to full week service, replacing the 24P. The GEORGE bus system was originally operated by Metrobus, until the City of Falls Church transferred operations to ART. This bus system served as a feeder to Metrorail stations at the east and west ends of the city. The GEORGE service was ultimately suspended in 2010 due to budget constraints.

In 2014, the Alexandria Transit Company's DASH bus began serving this station with the AT9 route (now Line 36A/B), connecting it to the City of Alexandria between Mark Center and Potomac Yard.

On December 29, 2019, Arlington Transit announced that First Transit commenced a five-year contract to operate the network, ending its partnership with National Express Transit which had operated ART since 2009. ART's operator switch went into effect in order to improve service with the on-time performance.

In August 2022, ART began operating event shuttle services for the annual Arlington County Fair. A month later, the agency began testing electric buses, as part of the plan to go carbon-neutral by 2050.

ART launched a microtransit program in April 2026.

== Ridership ==
In 2025, ART carried 2,622,988 riders. As of June 2025, ART carries roughly 9,500 passengers per weekday within Arlington County. Route 41, which runs from Columbia Pike to Rosslyn via Ballston, is ART's busiest route with about 2,200 rides per weekday, with peak head ways of 12 minutes during rush hour. Arlington Transit has nearly returned to pre-pandemic ridership levels; in 2019, ART carried a total 2.9 million passengers and carried 10,600 riders per weekday.

== Fares ==
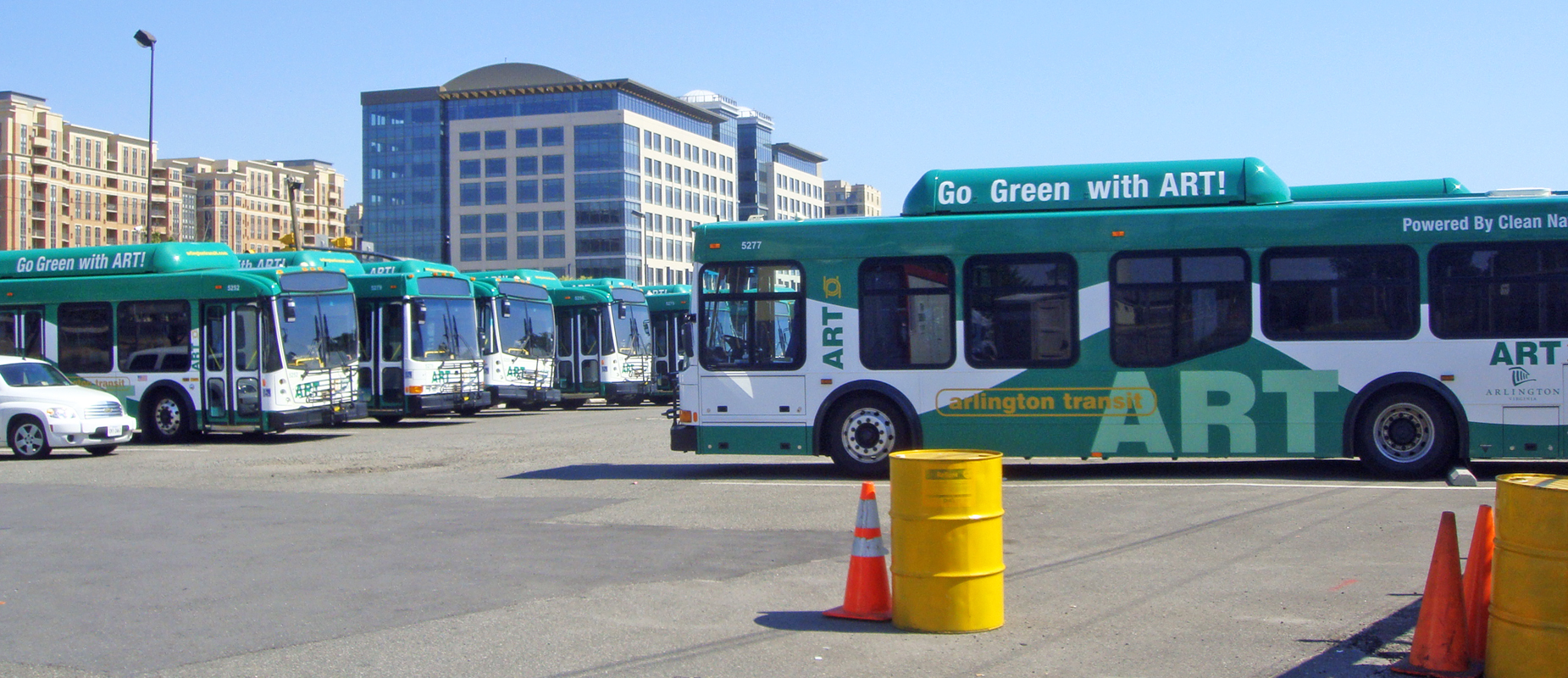
ART fleet of CNG-powered buses at Crystal City yard in 2010.

As of July 2024, ART operates a standard fare system primarily using the WMATA run SmarTrip fare network while still accepting cash payments. Reduced fares are available for senior citizens and other eligible riders. Students using an iRide SmarTrip card ride free, along with children under five years of age when accompanied by a fare paying adult. Employees of Virginia Hospital Center and Arlington County may also ride certain routes at no charge with an eligible ID.

=== History ===
In January 2009, ART stopped accepting paper transfers. Riders were required to use a SmarTrip card to get the rail-to-bus discount or to transfer free from bus to bus. Bus-to-bus transfer between ART and Metrobus was made free. Transfers from ART and Metrorail received a $0.50 discount. From September 3, 2013, to April 30, 2023, those attending Arlington Public Schools could obtain an iRide SmarTrip card that provided a discounted fare.

== Routes ==
Route	Terminals		Major streets	Notes
41; Columbia Pike – Ballston – Court House	Arlington Mill (S Dinwiddie St & Columbia Pike)	Court House	Columbia Pike; Glebe Rd; Clarendon Blvd; Wilson Blvd	A Pike Ride route
42; Ballston – Pentagon	Ballston	Pentagon (weekdays); Pentagon City (weekends)	Wilson Blvd; Washington Blvd; S Courthouse Rd; Columbia Pike	
43; Court House – Rosslyn – Crystal City	Crystal City	Court House	Richmond Hwy; Wilson Blvd; Clarendon Blvd	Limited stop service; Weekday service only (Note: Weekend service was eliminated on June 30, 2019)
45; Columbia Pike – Sequoia – Rosslyn	Arlington Mill (S Dinwiddie St & Columbia Pike)	Rosslyn	Columbia Pike; S Courthouse Rd; N Barton St; Clarendon Blvd; Wilson Blvd	
51; Ballston – Virginia Hospital Center	Ballston	Lee Heights (N George Mason Dr & Langston Blvd)	N George Mason Dr; Washington Blvd; N Fairfax Dr	Service started on July 23, 2001.
52; Ballston – Virginia Hospital Center – East Falls Church	Ballston	East Falls Church	N Sycamore St; Yorktown Blvd; N George Mason Dr; Washington Blvd	
55; East Falls Church – Langston Blvd – Rosslyn	East Falls Church	Rosslyn	Langston Blvd	
56; Military Rd – Rosslyn	Madison Community Center	Rosslyn	Military Rd; N Quincy St; Wilson Blvd; Clarendon Blvd; N Queen St	Weekday peak hour service only
72; Rock Spring – Ballston – Shirlington	Rock Spring (Williamsburg Blvd & N Glebe Rd)	Shirlington	N Glebe Rd; George Mason Dr; S Four Mile Run Dr	Weekday service only
74; Arlington Village – Arlington View – Pentagon City	Pentagon City	Arlington Village (Walter Reed Dr & Columbia Pike)	Walter Reed Dr; Columbia Pike; S Barton St; 16th St S; S Queen St	A Pike Ride route; Peak hour service only
75; Shirlington – Wakefield HS – Ballston – Virginia Square	Virginia Square	Shirlington	Wilson Blvd; N Kensington St; Carlin Springs Rd; 7th Rd S; S Dinwiddie St	A Pike Ride route; Weekdays only
77; Shirlington – Lyon Park – Court House	Court House	Shirlington	Wilson Blvd; Clarendon Blvd; Washington Blvd; Walter Reed Dr; Arlington Mill Dr	Monday – Saturday service only
84; Douglas Park – Green Valley – Pentagon City	Pentagon City	Douglas Park (S Monroe St & 18th St S)	19th St S; S Nelson St; 24th Rd S; S Glebe Rd	Peak hour service only
87; Pentagon – Army Navy Dr – Shirlington	Pentagon (weekdays); Pentagon City (weekends)	Shirlington	Army Navy Dr; S Glebe Rd	Previously ran as 87A/P/X during weekday peak hours (Note: 87A/P/X was combined to a single 87 route on January 11, 2026)

== Fleet ==
Arlington Transit's fleet of buses comprises 82 clean-burning compressed natural gas and battery electric buses as a part of the Arlington Initiative to Reduce Emission project (AIRE) in order to be environmentally friendly in Arlington County and to achieve carbon neutral emissions in the county by 2050.

Arlington Transit opened a new light maintenance facility on September 26, 2017, which included a bus wash, compressed natural gas refueling, and 25 spaces for buses. Previously, ART had contracted many of these services out to WMATA and faced higher costs and restricted time. On December 10, 2024, ART opened a second larger Operations and Maintenance Facility (AOMF).

Photo	Type	Delivered	Numbers (Total)	Engine	Transmisson	Notes
	New Flyer; Xcelsior XN40	2017–2022	5281–5299; 5400–5419 (33 buses)	Cummins-Westport L9N	Allison B400R6	
	New Flyer; Xcelsior XN35	2019	5300–5313 (14 buses)	Cummins-Westport L9N	Allison B400R6	
	Gillig; Low Floor 35' CNG	2024	5314–5328 (15 buses)	Cummins-Westport L9N	Allison B400R6	
	Gillig; Low Floor Plus 35' EV	2025	5329E (1 bus)	Cummins BES	Direct Drive	First Electric Buses for ART
	Gillig; Low Floor Plus 40' EV	2025–2026	5420E–5430E (11 buses)	Cummins BES	Direct Drive	First Electric Buses for ART

=== Retired fleet ===
Delivered	Type	Numbers (Total)	Retired	Engine	Transmisson	Photo	Notes
2002	Ford/StarTrans Bus; Senator CNG	5220–5227 (7 buses)	2008	Unknown	Unknown		
2002	Thomas Dennis; SLF230	5295–5299 (4 buses)	2013	Cummins ISB	Allison B300R		
2007	NABI; 35-LFW Gen I CNG	5271–5279 (8 buses)	2022–2024	Cummins-Wesport C-Gas Plus	ZF Ecomat 6HP592C		First low-floor buses for Arlington Transit.
2008	NABI; 35-LFW Gen II CNG	5252–5292 (12 buses)	2021–2023	Cummins-Westport ISL-G	ZF Ecomat 6HP594C		
2010–2011	NABI; 31-LFW Gen II CNG	5060–5079 (15 buses)	2022–2024	Cummins-Westport ISL-G	ZF Ecomat 6HP594C		
2011	DesignLine Corporation; EcoSaver	5047–5049 (3 buses)	2014	Capstone C30 Microturbine	Unknown		CNG-electric hybrid; Retired due to safety and reliability concerns.
2011–2013	ARBOC; Spirit of Mobility CNG	5083–5088; 5040–5053 (14 buses)	2019	GMC Vortec 6.0L	6-Speed Automatic		First low-floor cutaway buses for Arlington Transit.
2014–2015	NABI; 40-LFW Gen III CNG	5054–5067; 5092–5099 (16 buses)	2025–2026	Cummins-Westport ISL-G	Allison B400R6		Final NABI order for Arlington Transit.; Some retained for training (Bus numbers unknown)
