= Sleepy Hollow, Virginia =

Unincorporated community in Virginia, United States

- Unincorporated community
- Location within Northern Virginia Location within Virginia Location within the United States
- Coordinates: 38°52′02″N 77°09′53″W
- Country: United States
- State: Virginia
- County: Fairfax
- Elevation: 302 ft (92 m)
- Time zone: UTC−5 (Eastern (EST))
  - Summer (DST): UTC−4 (EDT)
- Area codes: 571 & 703
- GNIS feature ID: 1493610

Sleepy Hollow is an unincorporated community in Fairfax County, Virginia, United States. Sleepy Hollow is 1.1 miles (1.8 km) south-southeast of Falls Church.
