= Arlington Heights Historic District =

Historic district in Virginia, United States

- U.S. National Register of Historic Places
- U.S. Historic district
- Virginia Landmarks Register
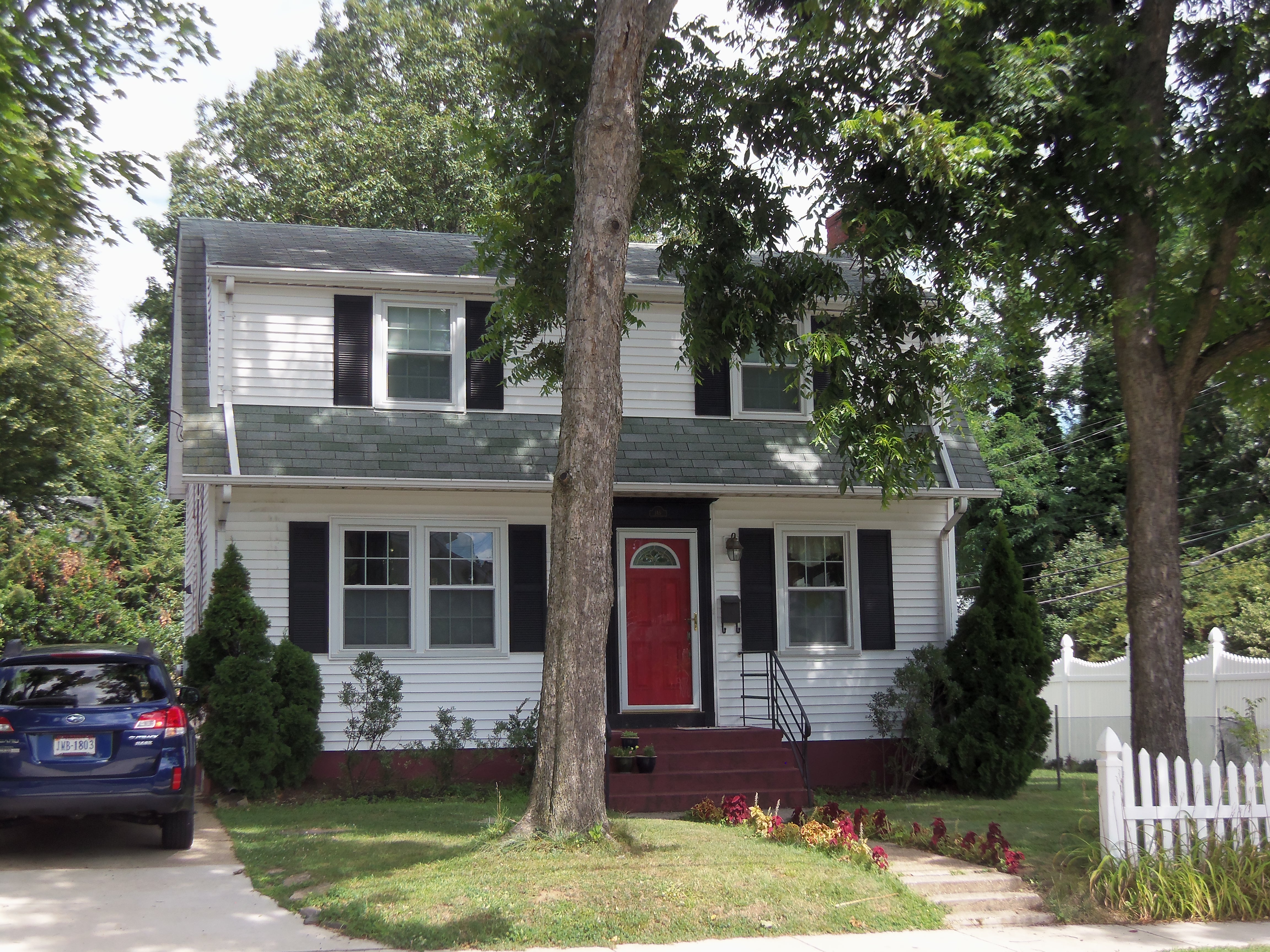

- Location within District of Columbia Location within Virginia Location within the United States
- Location: Bounded by Arlington Blvd., S. Fillmore St., S. Walter Reed Dr., Columbia Pk., & S. Glebe Rd., Arlington County, Virginia
- Coordinates: 38°52′2″N 77°5′27″W
- Area: 177.1 acres (71.7 ha)
- Built: 1909
- Architect: Beger, Charles; Behm, Fred et al.
- Architectural style: Colonial Revival, Tudor Revival, et al.
- MPS: Garden Apartments, Apartment Houses and Apartment Complexes in Arlington County, Virginia MPS
- NRHP reference No.: 08000063
- VLR No.: 000-3383

Significant dates
- Added to NRHP: February 21, 2008
- Designated VLR: December 5, 2007

The Arlington Heights Historic District is a residential neighborhood in South Arlington (Arlington County, Virginia). Most of the neighborhood developed during the first half of the twentieth century, with additional construction and redevelopment occurring over the following decades. The housing stock includes a variety of detached homes ranging from modest cottages, Colonials, and Cape Cods to expanded homes and newer custom residences.

The neighborhood's early growth was closely tied to the electric streetcar that operated along Columbia Pike, providing residents with convenient transportation to Washington, D.C. As automobile ownership became widespread, development expanded beyond the streetcar line while Columbia Pike remained the area's principal commercial district.

Today, Columbia Pike contains a diverse mix of locally owned restaurants, coffee shops, retail businesses, neighborhood services, and mixed-use development. Its two nearby highways (Interstate 395 and Route 50) and public transportation network provide convenient access to Washington, D.C., the Pentagon, Crystal City, Ballston, Reagan National Airport, and other destinations throughout Northern Virginia.

Arlington Heights remains primarily residential while ongoing renovation, expansion, and infill construction continue to reshape portions of the neighborhood. It also contains a number of duplexes, garden apartments, a synagogue, two elementary schools, a middle school with a community center, two landscaped parks, and a great diner.

Its location, transportation network, and commercial district have sustained demand while much of its original residential character remains intact.

It was listed on the National Register of Historic Places in 2008.
