= Columbia Forest Historic District =

Historic district in Virginia, United States

- U.S. National Register of Historic Places
- U.S. Historic district
- Virginia Landmarks Register
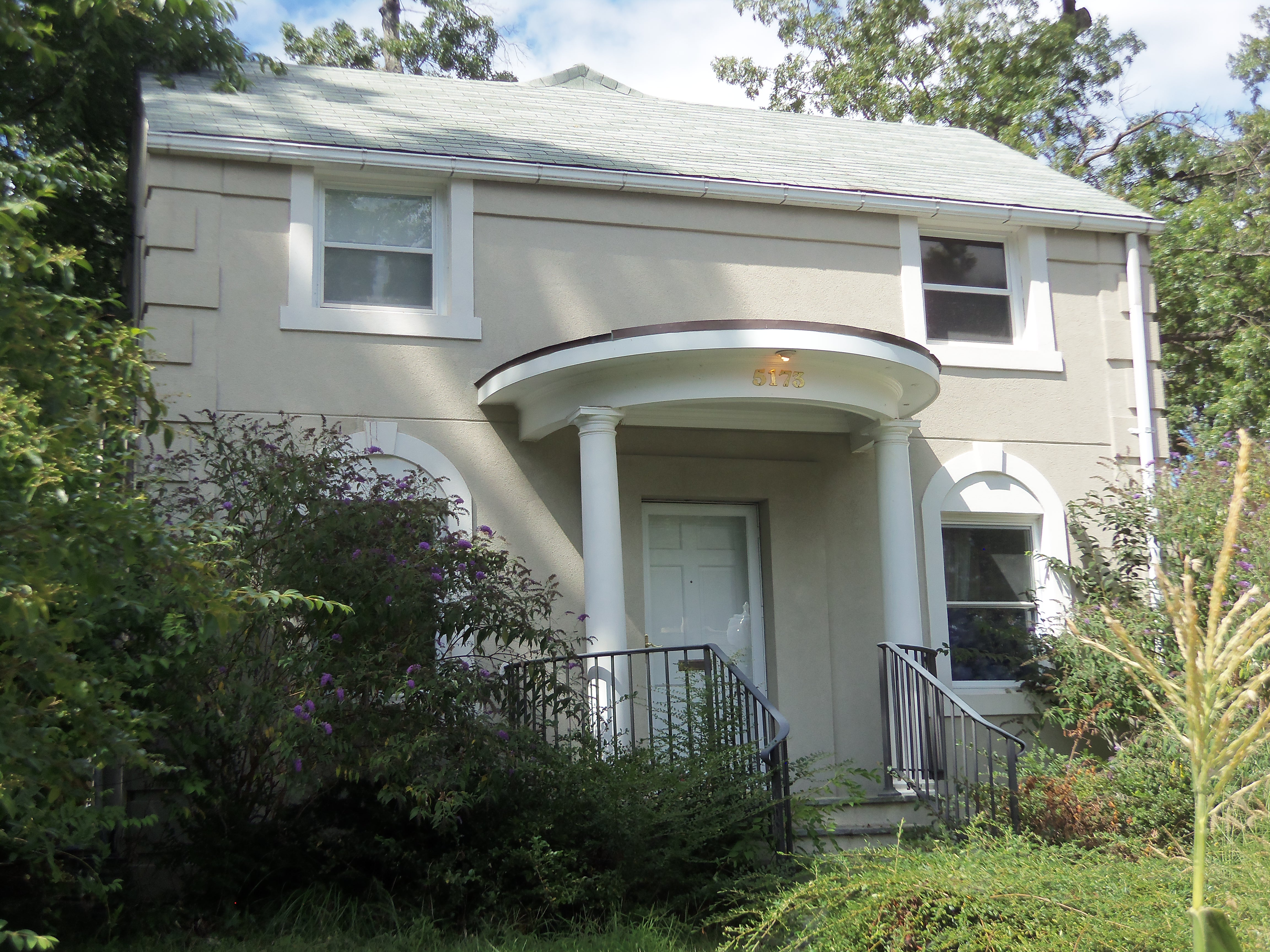

- Location within District of Columbia Location within Virginia Location within the United States
- Location: Bounded by 11th, S. Edison, S. Dinwiddie, S. Columbus, S. George Mason, and S. Frederick St., Arlington, Virginia
- Coordinates: 38°51′09″N 77°6′41″W
- Area: 48 acres (19 ha)
- Built: 1942-1945
- Built by: Army Corps of Engineers; Johnson, Jesse
- Architectural style: Colonial Revival
- NRHP reference No.: 04000047
- VLR No.: 000-9416

Significant dates
- Added to NRHP: February 11, 2004
- Designated VLR: December 3, 2003

The Columbia Forest Historic District is a national historic district located at Arlington County, Virginia. It is directly east of the Virginia Heights Historic District. It contains 238 contributing buildings in a residential neighborhood in South Arlington. They were built in two phases beginning in 1942 and ending in 1945, and consist of 233 single-family dwellings contracted by the Federal government to house the families of young officers and ranking officials. They are two-story, two- and three-bay, paired brick or concrete block dwellings in the Colonial Revival-style. They were built under the direction of the Army Corps of Engineers by the Defense Housing Corporation.

It was listed on the National Register of Historic Places in 2004.
