= SmarTrip =

Contactless transit card system used in the Washington, D.C. metro area

- Location: Washington metropolitan area
- Launched: May 18, 1999; 27 years ago
- Operator: Cubic Transportation Systems, Accenture, Littlepay
- Manager: Washington Metropolitan Area Transit Authority
- Currency: USD ($300 maximum load)
- Validity: Washington Metro; Metrobus; Arlington Transit; Fairfax Connector; Loudoun County Transit; OmniRide
- Variants: CharmCard (2010–2025)
- Website: wmata.com/fares/smartrip

SmarTrip, alternatively spelled Smart Trip as part of an ongoing 2026 rebrand, is a contactless payment system for public transit in the Washington metropolitan area, managed by the Washington Metropolitan Area Transit Authority. SmarTrip is accepted on the Washington Metro, Metrobus, and local bus services in Northern Virginia.

SmarTrip was introduced in 1999 on the Washington Metro, and began rolling out to buses in 2002. The Maryland Transit Administration partnered with WMATA to operate the CharmCard, a version of the SmarTrip card that was used for local transit services in the Baltimore metropolitan area from 2010 to 2025.

SmarTrip was initially criticized for its slow rollout, and some Metro stations did not have SmarTrip vending machines until 2012. SmarTrip system upgrades since 2020 have allowed users to add their SmarTrip cards to Apple Pay and Google Wallet. Contactless credit and debit cards have been accepted on SmarTrip readers on the Washington Metro and Metrobus since 2025, branded as "Tap. Ride. Go."

== Services ==
=== Washington Metro ===
SmarTrip cards are accepted on the Washington Metro (Metrorail). SmarTrip fully replaced Metrorail paper tickets in 2016. WMATA offers multiple types of daily, weekly, and monthly passes for Metrorail on SmarTrip cards. Washington Metro faregates also accept contactless credit and debit card payments for single trip fares only.

SmarTrip cards provide discounts for passengers transferring between Metrorail and buses. Additionally, the SmarTrip system enables an out-of-system interchange between Farragut North station and Farragut West station. Exiting one station and entering the other to make a transfer between Metrorail lines is treated as a single trip by the SmarTrip system.

=== Metrobus ===
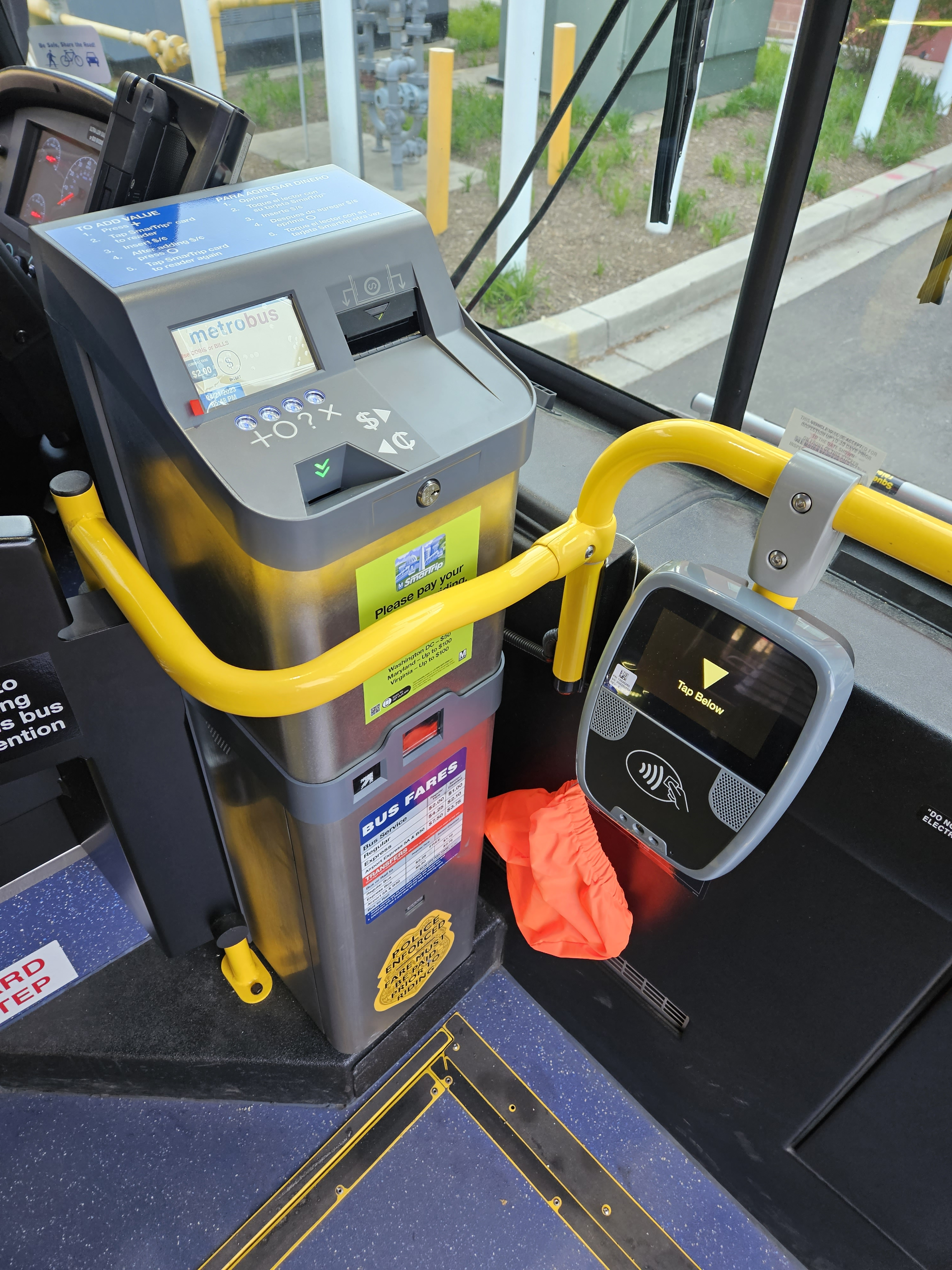
Farebox and SmarTrip reader on a Metrobus in 2023

SmarTrip has been accepted on Metrobus since 2004, replacing Metrobus paper transfers in 2009 and paper monthly passes in 2011.

=== Regional buses ===
SmarTrip cards are accepted on multiple local and commuter bus operators across the Washington metropolitan area. As of 2026, Arlington Transit, Fairfax Connector, Loudoun County Transit, and OmniRide accept SmarTrip cards for their fares. A Regional Bus Pass is available exclusively on SmarTrip cards, which covers rides on local services operated by Metrobus, Arlington Transit, and Fairfax Connector. CUE Bus, DASH, TheBus, and Ride On formerly accepted SmarTrip cards before they became fare-free.

=== SmartBenefits ===
SmartBenefits is WMATA's system for distributing pre-tax commuter benefits to employees of eligible employers in the Washington area, including the federal government. Pre-tax commuter benefits allow employees to pay for the cost of their public transit trips to work with funds that are not subject to federal income taxes. SmartBenefits allows employees to directly send their funds to a SmarTrip card for rides on transit services that accept SmarTrip. SmartBenefits users can also distribute their funds to other services for their commute, such as a vanpool or a monthly pass for VRE and MARC commuter trains.

=== Parking ===
As of 2026, WMATA accepts SmarTrip at 40 commuter parking facilities at Metrorail stations. At 13 stations, customers with SmarTrip provides a discounted rate on parking. Discounted parking rates are only available with a SmarTrip card, and are not available when paying for either transit fares or parking with a credit card.

== History ==
The SmarTrip system debuted for the public in May 1999, and was the first contactless smart card for transit in the United States. It was implemented by Cubic Transportation Systems, a subsidiary of San Diego-based Cubic Corporation. Before the SmarTrip card was introduced, Cubic conducted a demonstration program from 1995 to 1996 using battery-powered electronic payment devices that were approximately the size of a cassette tape.

In the early 2000s, WMATA proposed to add fare capping to SmarTrip, awarding passengers a weekly or monthly unlimited pass after they took a certain number of rides in that period. Fare capping was planned to be branded as "Fair Fares." WMATA's studies ultimately found that the system would be too technically complex, and marketing would be difficult, and the proposal was never implemented.

SmarTrip introduced SmartBenefits in 2000, allowing employees of Washington-area employers to conveniently redeem pretax commuter benefits towards public transit. By 2003, SmartBenefits had over 550 employers enrolled, with over 17,000 employees.

The first SmarTrip readers were installed on Metrobuses in 2002, and SmarTrip was fully accepted across the Metrobus network by the end of 2004. In May 2004, SmarTrip readers were introduced at parking garage gates.

Two banks conducted pilot programs with WMATA in the early 2000s, issuing bank cards that also functioned as SmarTrip cards. First Union issued ATM cards that functioned as SmarTrip cards in 2000, and Citibank trialled a combination SmarTrip-credit card in 2005. Neither program was made permanent, although a similar concept was used by the Barclaycard OnePulse card in London from 2007 to 2014.

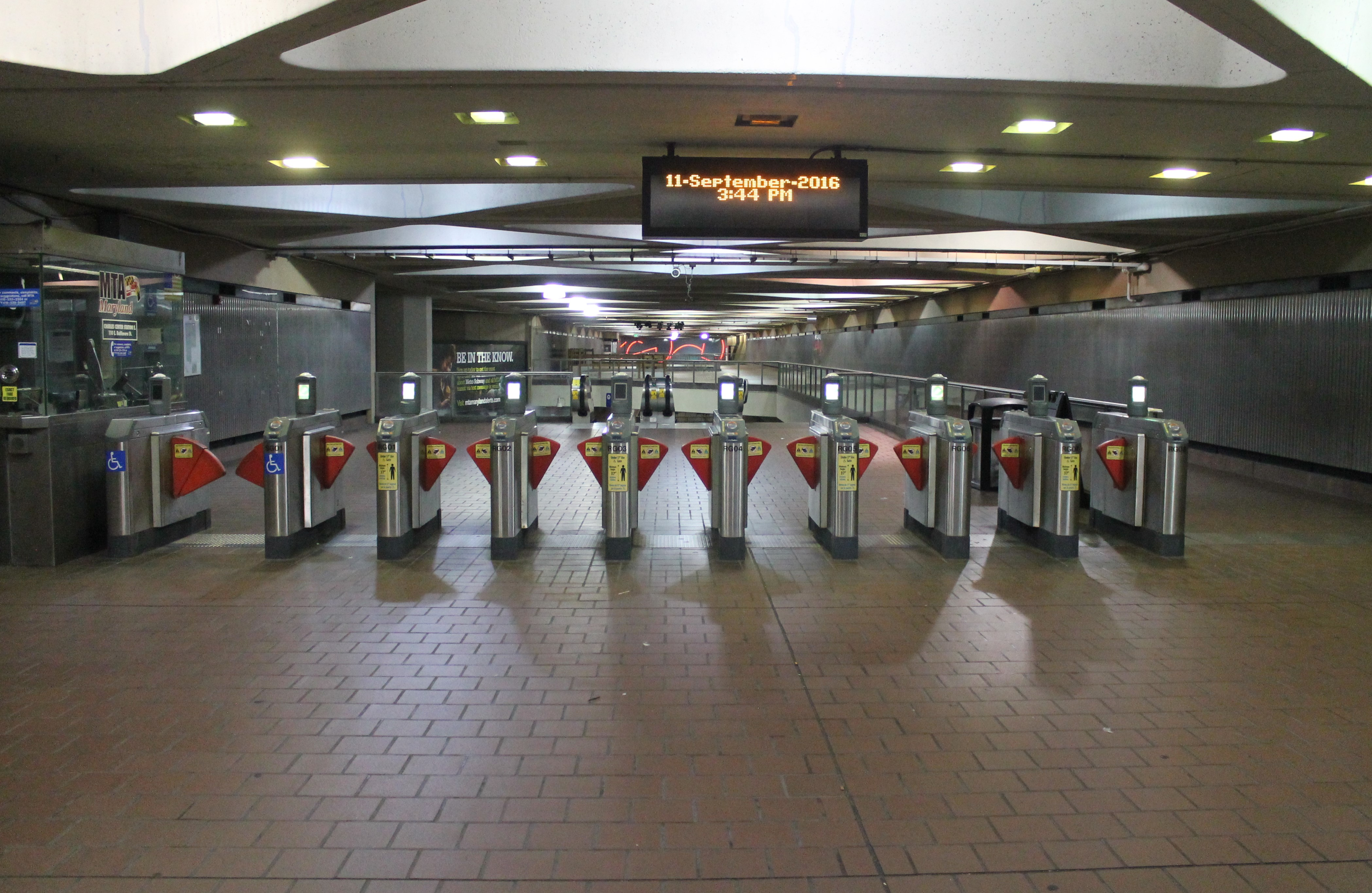
CharmCard faregates at Charles Center station in Baltimore, 2016

In December 2008, Metro reached an agreement with CVS Pharmacy to sell the cards at 187 DC-area locations in an effort to increase SmarTrip use. SmarTrip cards fully replaced paper Metrobus transfers in 2009, and paper Metrobus passes in 2011. In December 2010, 1,800,000 SmarTrip cards were in use. The CharmCard system was introduced in Baltimore in 2010, creating a regional fare payment system for local transit services across the Washington and Baltimore metropolitan areas. By late 2012, SmarTrip vending machines were available at all Metrorail stations.

WMATA hired Accenture in 2014 to upgrade the SmarTrip system, awarding the firm a contract worth $184 million. The planned upgrades included support for PIV cards used as federal government employee IDs, and payments with contactless credit and debit cards. WMATA conducted a pilot program at 10 Metrorail stations and 6 bus routes, and hoped to fully implement the upgrade by 2017. 3,000 people signed up to participate in the program, but only 400 participated, and WMATA was not satisfied with the results. The contract was cancelled in the spring of 2016 by WMATA general manager Paul Wiedefeld, after $25 million was already spent.

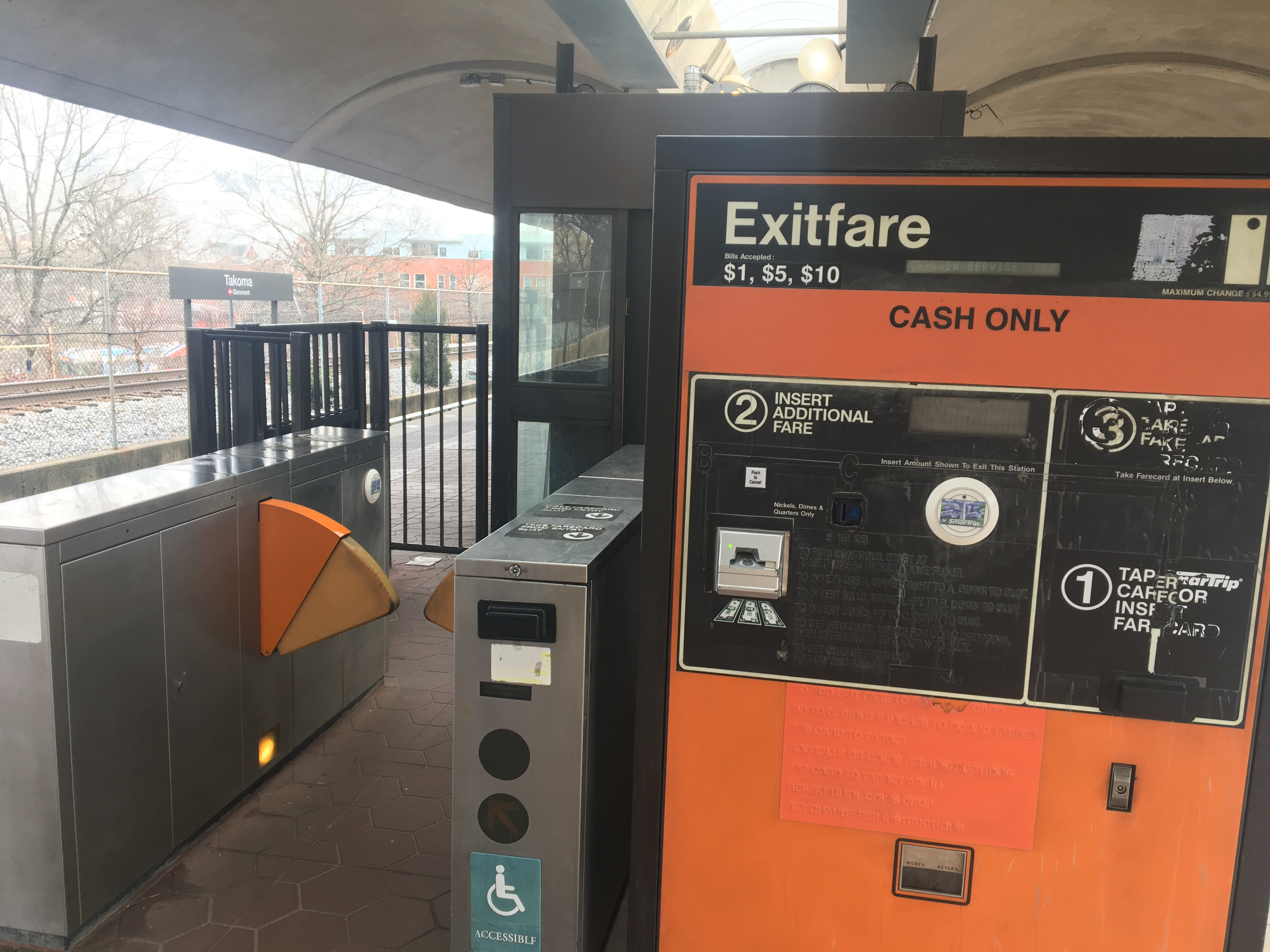
Metrorail customers whose SmarTrip cards do not have enough value to cover their fare must use an exit fare machine to add money to their card

When SmarTrip was introduced in 1999, riders were able to incur a negative balance of up to $5 on cards. This allowed customers to exit the Metrorail system if their card had insufficient value to cover their fare, and was funded by the $5 purchase price of the SmarTrip card. This policy was revised in 2013 to only allow a $1.50 negative balance, and removed altogether in 2018. Since 2018, all riders must have a sufficient balance on their card to pay a bus fare or exit the Metrorail system.

District of Columbia Public Schools students began receiving student ID cards that also functioned as SmarTrip cards in the early 2010s. The DC One Card was launched in 2008 as a student ID for DCPS students, and could be used as a SmarTrip card beginning in 2011. The DC One Card replaced a system of paper bus and Metrorail passes for DC school students, who often take public transit to school, as DCPS does not operate traditional school buses.

To receive free rides with their DC One Cards, students had to complete a complex registration process. Many students bypassed this process by boarding buses and entering Metrorail stations without tapping their cards. A study conducted at the end of the 2015–2016 school year estimated that students failed to tap their cards for 3.8 million trips. WMATA changed its policies for the 2017–2018 school year, requiring students to tap the cards. The policy change was received poorly, and led to criticism of the registration process. Beginning in the 2018–2019 school year, the DC One Card was replaced by standard SmarTrip cards with a Kids Ride Free pass pre-loaded onto the card. Card shortages and administrative problems affected thousands of students in the early days of the Kids Ride Free SmarTrip card program, meaning that some students paid out-of-pocket or missed school.

In 2018, WMATA introduced multiple policy changes to SmarTrip, including eliminating the ability for riders to carry a small negative balance on their cards. A "Rush Hour Promise" program was introduced that year, providing automatic refunds to customers whose trips were delayed. The Rush Hour Promise was supposed to apply to both Metrobus and Metrorail, but in April 2018, only 0.26% of refunds were issued to bus riders.

CVS Pharmacy publicly threatened to discontinue SmarTrip card sales at its stores in May 2018, before reaching an agreement with WMATA. Metrobus Route 79 only accepted SmarTrip for payment from 2018 to 2019 as part of a pilot program to remove cash payment as an option on Metrobus. The pilot was heavily criticized, and was not made permanent.

In 2020, Apple and WMATA enabled SmarTrip cards to be added to Apple Pay through the Wallet app. In 2021, Google Pay on Android devices became supported as well.

In the early 2020s, multiple bus operators in the Washington metropolitan area made their services free permanently, exiting the SmarTrip system. Many public transit systems in the United States temporarily removed fares in 2020 in response to the COVID-19 pandemic. In the aftermath of the pandemic, local political leaders across the Washington area began seriously considering free fares on locally operated bus systems. DASH, operated by the city of Alexandria, Virginia, was the first in the area to permanently implement a fare-free policy in 2021. In Montgomery County, Maryland, the county-operated Ride On bus system specifically cited the cost of upgrading SmarTrip systems as a reason for removing fares in 2025.

== Design and promotional artwork ==
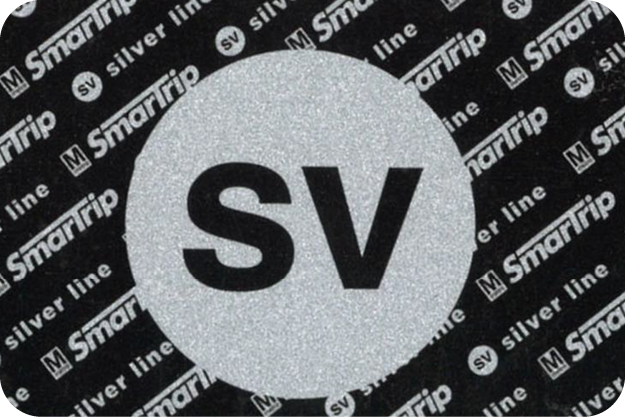
SmarTrip card design for the opening of the Metrorail Silver Line in 2014

The standard SmarTrip card features a stylized design of a Metrorail car and a Metrobus in front the Washington Monument and the United States Capitol.

WMATA has issued special designs on SmarTrip cards since 2008. Limited-edition SmarTrip cards commemorate major events, including presidential inaugurations, the National Cherry Blossom Festival, and Metrorail expansions.

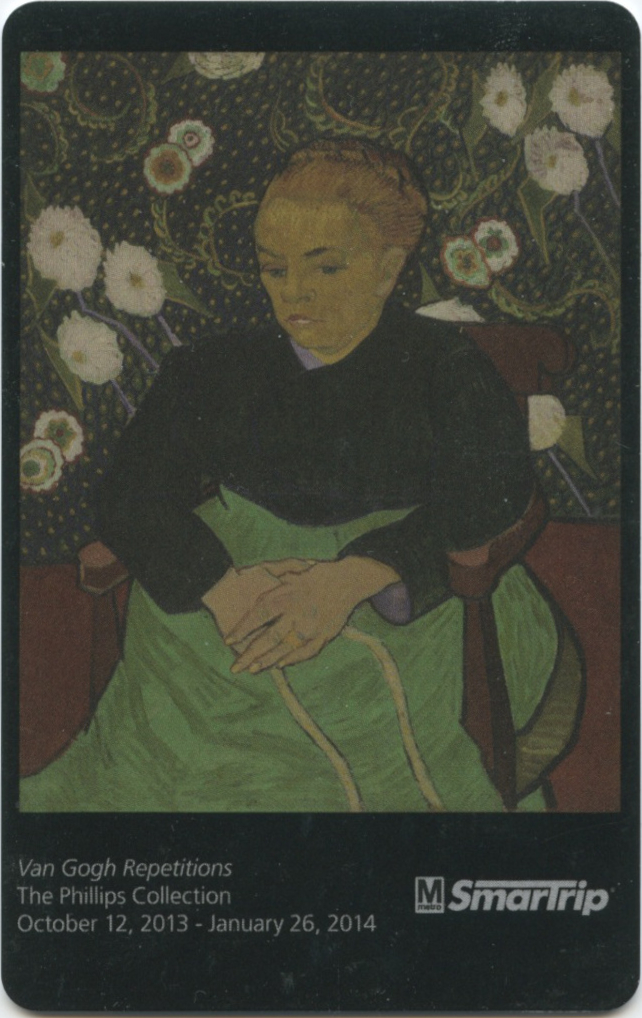
SmarTrip card promoting a Van Gogh exhibition in 2013

The first two promotional SmarTrip cards were issued in 2008 to commemorate the opening of the newly built stadium of the Washington Nationals, Nationals Park. Special SmarTrip cards commemorating the inauguration of President Barack Obama were issued in January 2009 and 2013. In July 2013, a special July 4 commemorative SmarTrip card was introduced. A series of cards featuring Vincent van Gogh paintings were issued in 2013 to promote an exhibition of van Gogh's works.

In June 2014, Metro celebrated the 125th anniversary of the National Zoo by issuing commemorative SmarTrip cards featuring "popular zoo baby residents."

In July 2014, a commemorative SmarTrip card was issued to celebrate the opening of the Silver Line. A refined version of this card was introduced in November 2022 to celebrate the opening of the second phase of the Silver Line.

Front side of a commemorative SmarTrip fare card celebrating DC Metro's 50th anniversary

In 2017 and 2025, special SmarTrip cards were introduced to commemorate the inauguration of President Donald Trump.

In March 2022, a promotional SmarTrip card was issued to celebrate the National Cherry Blossom Festival. Cards of different designs were also issued from 2023 to 2026.

In May 2023, Metro introduced a commemorative SmarTrip card to celebrate the opening of the Potomac Yard Station.

In January 2025, a commemorative SmarTrip card was issued to celebrate the return of pandas to the National Zoo.

To celebrate Metro's 50th anniversary, special edition SmarTrip designs were issued in summer 2026.

== Technology ==
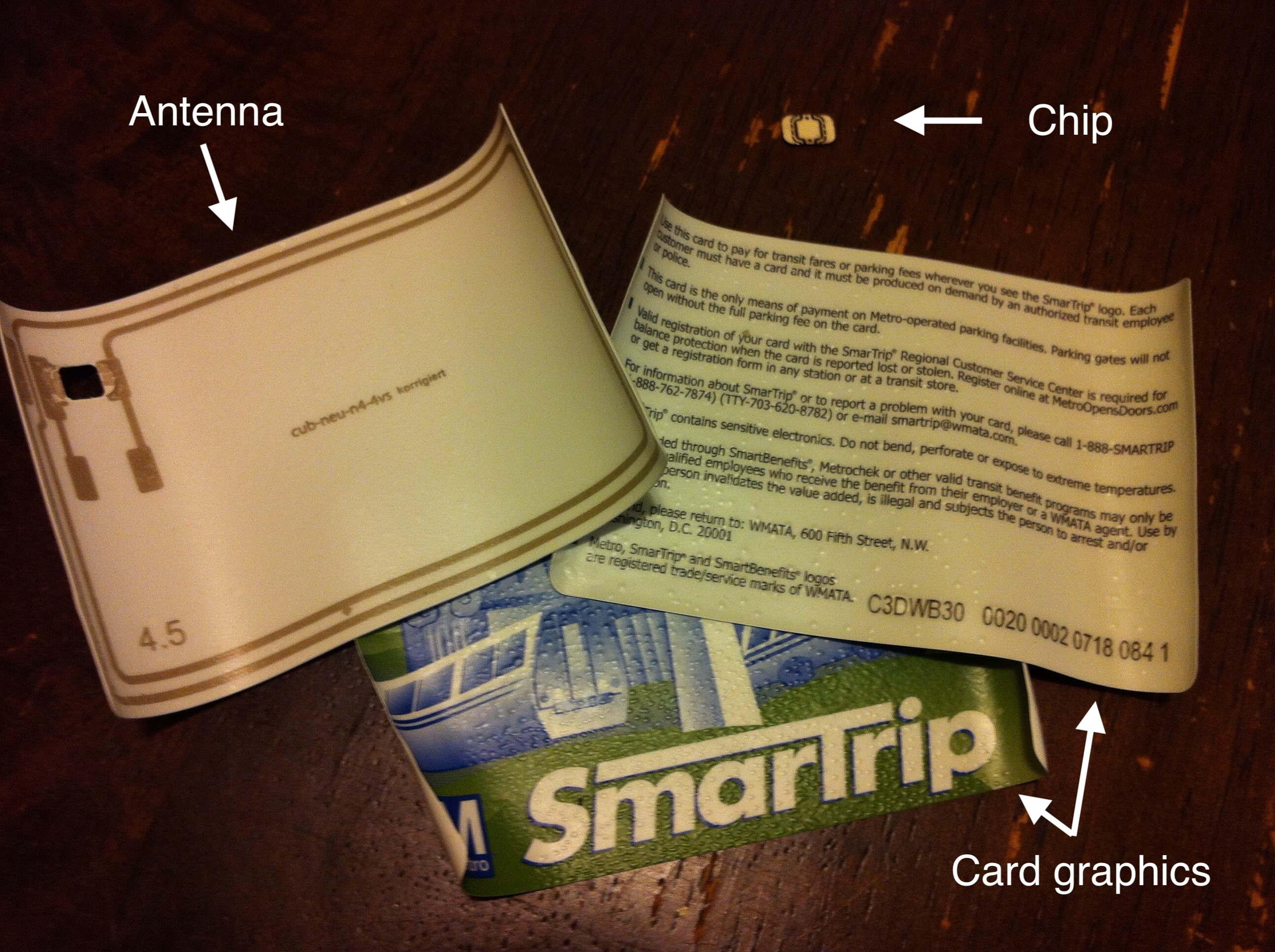
A disassembled first-generation SmarTrip card

The first-generation SmarTrip system was installed by Cubic Transportation Systems. First-generation SmarTrip cards used Cubic's proprietary Go CARD technology, using proprietary chips manufactured by Fujitsu to Cubic's specification. Card data on first-generation cards was encrypted with the Triple DES cipher. Bus fareboxes were supplied by GFI Genfare, with smartcard readers in the fareboxes designed by Cubic. The bus farebox hardware was designed for forward compatibility, supporting the Go CARD technology and standard ISO/IEC 14443 smart cards.

The SmarTrip system allows customers to add value to their cards onboard buses. Customers can tap their card on a Metrobus farebox and insert cash to add value to the card. This option has been criticized for increasing dwell times on buses.

The SmarTrip system expanded in the early 2000s, becoming a regional system that supported multiple transit operators in Washington, D.C., Maryland, and Virginia. ERG Group developed a regional payment processing and customer service system for SmarTrip, which began operation in 2004. Cubic installed new card readers on Metrorail fare gates in the late 2000s as part of a system upgrade that enabled more types of rail and bus passes.

Cubic stopped manufacturing the Go CARD chips for SmarTrip cards in 2009, prompting WMATA to switch SmarTrip cards to a second-generation chip that is compatible with ISO/IEC 14443. Second-generation SmarTrip cards have a serial number beginning with "0167." First-generation SmarTrip cards functioned until 2022.

In the early 2020s, WMATA introduced upgrades to allow SmarTrip accounts in Apple Pay and Google Wallet on smartphones. SmarTrip accounts on smartphones emulate a physical SmarTrip card using the MIFARE 2GO cloud system from NXP, and are available by either opening a new account or converting an existing plastic SmarTrip card.

The launch of contactless credit and debit card payments on Metrorail and Metrobus in 2025 used a cloud-based "overlay" developed by Littlepay, an Australian fintech firm. Littlepay's payment processing software operates separately from the existing SmarTrip computer systems, requiring only a reconfiguration of existing card readers.

WMATA collects detailed data about passenger trips from the SmarTrip system. The most detailed data are available from Metrorail trips, where SmarTrip card users tap their cards as they enter and exit. WMATA staff use data from the SmarTrip system to inform policy and enhance service planning. Additionally, SmarTrip data has been used for academic studies, including a 2024 study on gender disparities among caregivers who use public transit and a 2025 study of the impact of the COVID-19 pandemic on Washington-area transit services.

== Variants ==
=== CharmCard ===
CharmCard
- Location: Baltimore metropolitan area
- Launched: September 21, 2010; 16 years ago
- Discontinued: December 31, 2025; 9 months ago
- Successor: CharmPass mobile app
- Operator: Cubic Transportation Systems
- Manager: Maryland Transit Administration

The CharmCard was a variant of the SmarTrip card available in the Baltimore metropolitan area, managed by the Maryland Transit Administration. It was introduced in 2010, and was replaced by the CharmPass mobile app in 2025.

The CharmCard system was designed by Cubic Transportation Systems, the same contractor as the initial SmarTrip installation. SmarTrip and CharmCard used the same technology, and value loaded onto either card could be used to pay for fares in both metropolitan areas. Fare prices, passes, transfers, and marketing were separate.

The CharmCard was accepted on BaltimoreLink local buses, Metro SubwayLink, and Light RailLink services. Other Maryland Transit Administration services, including MARC trains and MTA Commuter Bus, did not accept the CharmCard.

The CharmPass mobile app replaces the CharmCard, and sells tickets for all MTA services, including local and commuter buses, MARC, subway, and light rail.

=== Youth cards ===
Multiple versions of the SmarTrip card are available for children under the age of 18, such as the Kids Ride Free card. Each transit system using the SmarTrip system sets its own fare policy, including policies for youth fares. As of 2025, the District of Columbia, Arlington County, Fairfax County, and Montgomery County provide SmarTrip cards that allow students to ride some transit services in their local area for free.

=== Reduced-fare programs ===
WMATA offers multiple types of SmarTrip card that provide 50% off all Metrobus and Metrorail fares. The Metro Lift program provides reduced fares to customers who are eligible for SNAP benefits. Senior SmarTrip cards are available to all customers over the age of 65, and reduced fares are also available for customers with disabilities.

=== U-Pass ===
A special variant of the SmarTrip card is available for college students at Washington-area universities, which is paid for by student fees. The U-Pass SmarTrip card provides unlimited rides on Metrorail and Metrobus services, and is issued by participating universities. U-Pass eligibility includes multiple universities that are located outside the Washington area and offer Washington-area internship programs.

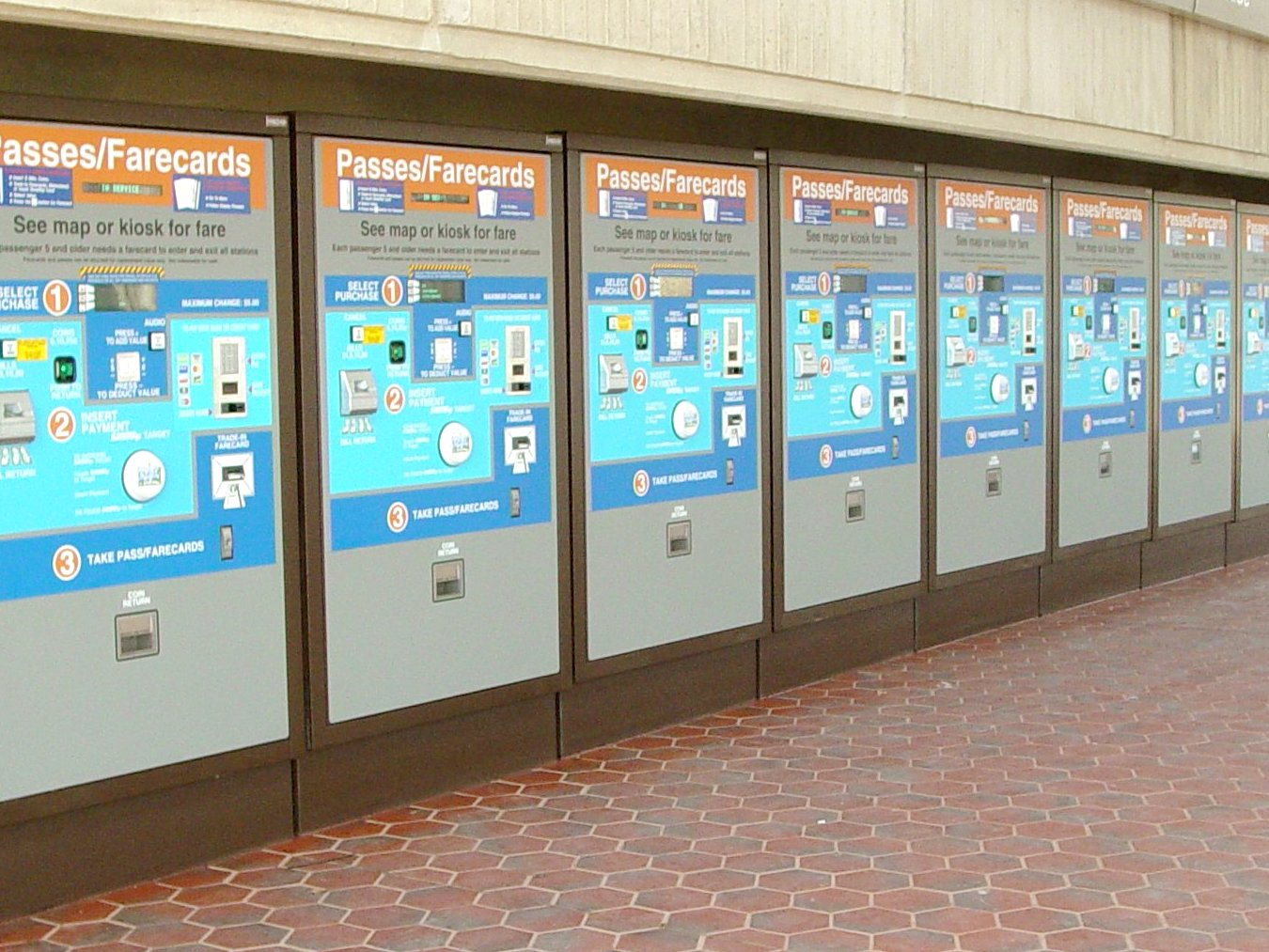
Farecard vending machines at Morgan Boulevard station equipped with SmarTrip targets.

== Participating systems ==
| System | Service area | Service type |
|---|---|---|
| Washington Metro | Washington metropolitan area | Rapid transit |
| Metrobus | Washington metropolitan area | Local bus |
| Arlington Transit | Arlington County, VA | Local bus |
| Fairfax Connector | Fairfax County, VA | Local bus |
| Loudoun County Transit | Loudoun County, VA | Commuter bus |
| OmniRide | Northern Virginia | Local bus, commuter bus |
| Purple Line | Maryland | Light rail |

=== Formerly participating ===
| System | Service area | Discontinued |
|---|---|---|
| DC Circulator | Washington, DC | |
| Baltimore Metro SubwayLink | Baltimore metropolitan area | Replaced by the CharmPass app in 2025 |
| Baltimore Light RailLink | Baltimore metropolitan area | Replaced by the CharmPass app in 2025 |
| MTA Maryland Local Buses | Baltimore metropolitan area | Replaced by the CharmPass app in 2025 |
| CUE Bus | City of Fairfax, VA | Fare-free since from 2022 until 2026 |
| DASH Bus | Alexandria, VA | Fare-free since 2021 |
| TheBus | Prince George's County, MD | Fare-free since 2025 |
| Ride On | Montgomery County, MD | Fare-free since 2025 |
