= Virginia State Route 244 =

State highway in northern Virginia, US

State Route 244
- Columbia Pike

Route information
- Maintained by VDOT
- Existed: 1933–present

Section 1
- Length: 4.58 mi (7.37 km)
- West end: SR 236 in Annandale
- Major intersections: SR 7 at Bailey's Crossroads
- East end: Arlington County line

Section 2
- Length: 0.37 mi (600 m)
- West end: South Joyce Street
- Major intersections: SR 27 at The Pentagon
- East end: Pentagon South Parking Lot

Location
- Country: United States
- State: Virginia
- Counties: Fairfax, Arlington

Highway system
- Virginia Routes; Interstate; US; Primary; Secondary; Byways; History; HOT lanes
← SR 243	→ SR 245

State Route 244 (SR 244) is a primary state highway in the U.S. state of Virginia. Known as Columbia Pike, the state highway's first segment runs 4.58 miles (7.37 km) from SR 236 in Annandale to the Arlington County line. Columbia Pike then continues east to SR 27 and Interstate 395 (I-395) at the Pentagon in Arlington. Columbia Pike is a major southwest–northeast thoroughfare in northeastern Fairfax County and eastern Arlington County, connecting Annandale with SR 7 at Bailey's Crossroads and SR 120 in the multicultural Westmont neighborhood of Arlington.

== Route description ==
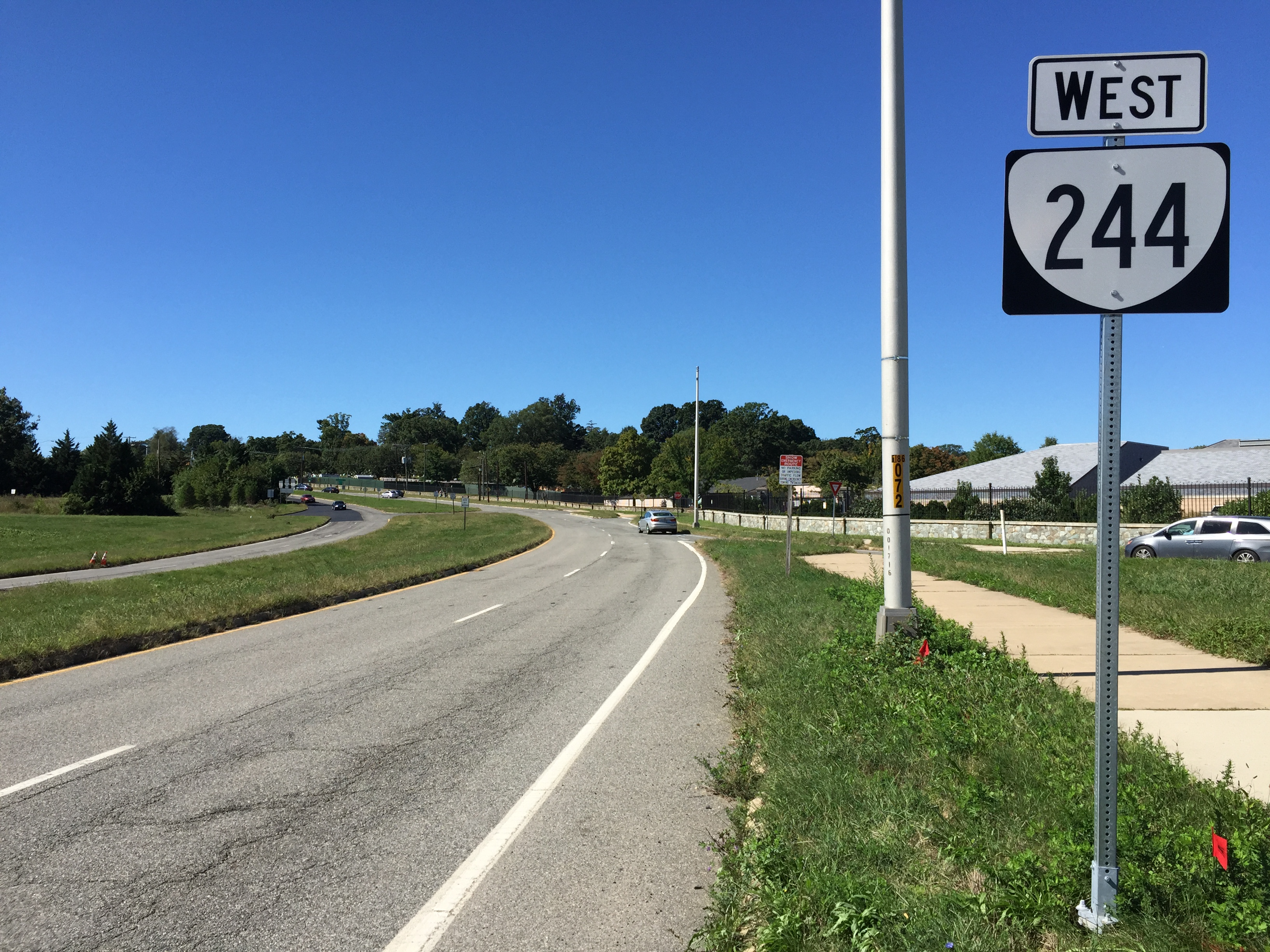
View west at the east end of SR 244 at SR 27 in Arlington

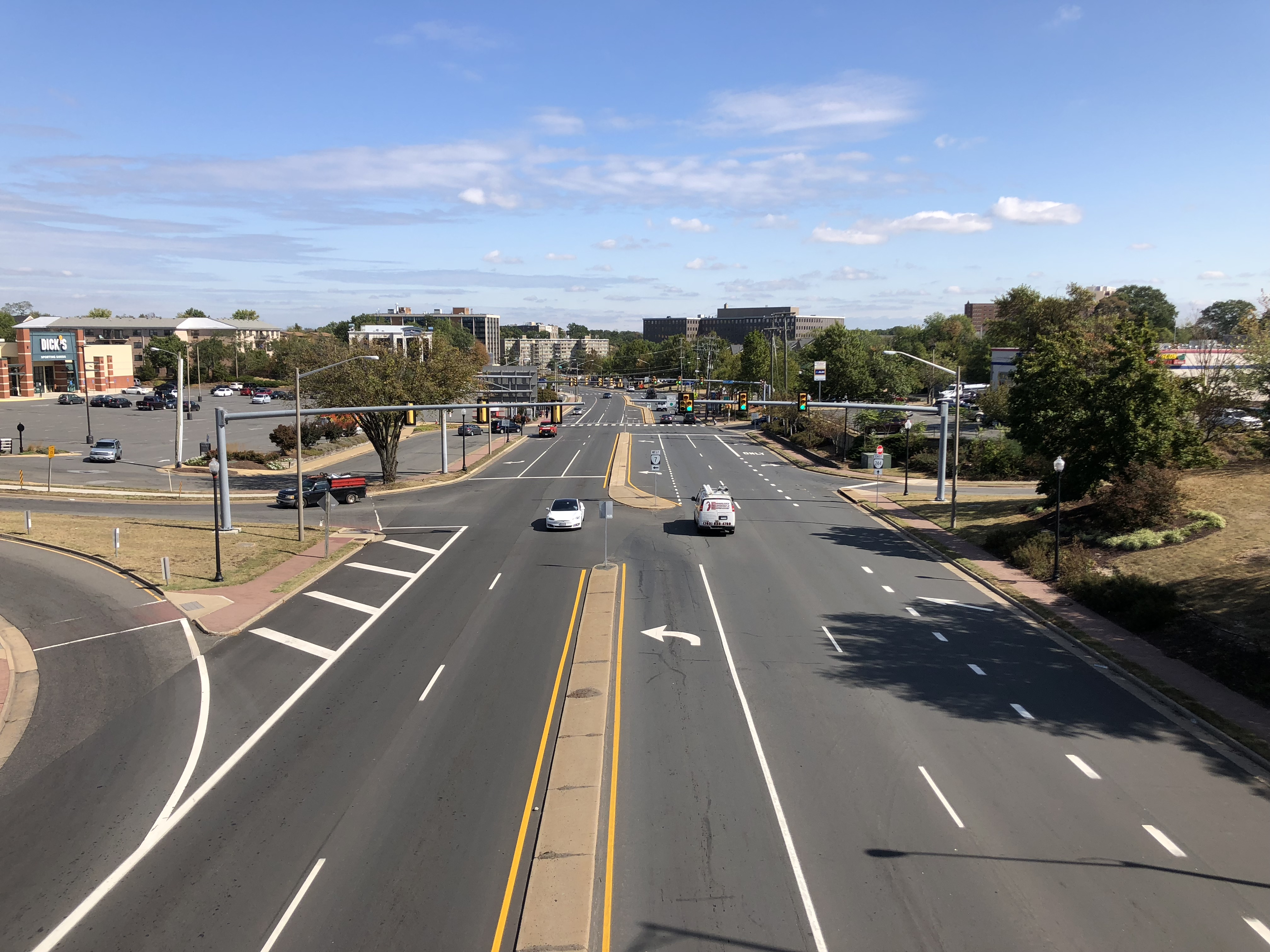
View east along SR 244 from SR 7 in Bailey's Crossroads

SR 244 begins at an intersection with SR 236 (Little River Turnpike) in Annandale. The westernmost segment of the state highway is a one-way, two-lane street westbound that has access only to westbound SR 236. Two-way traffic on the highway begins at its intersection with SR 617 (Backlick Road), through which all other connections between SR 244 and SR 236 are made. SR 244 heads east out of the center of Annandale as a four-lane undivided highway that becomes divided at its intersection with SR 711 (Gallows Road). The state highway veers northeast at its junction with SR 613 (Lincolnia Road) and SR 712 (Old Columbia Pike). SR 244 crosses Holmes Run as it curves around the southeastern end of Lake Barcroft. SR 244 has a partial cloverleaf interchange with SR 7 (Leesburg Pike) at Bailey's Crossroads before crossing the Fairfax–Arlington county line, where its state highway designation ends.

Columbia Pike continues east as an undivided highway shortly before Four Mile Run, where the highway also crosses the Four Mile Run Trail and intersects the Washington & Old Dominion Railroad Trail. The road intersects George Mason Drive, SR 120 (Glebe Road), and Walter Reed Drive in Westmont—a neighborhood often considered to be the center of Arlington's immigrant community, with many of its stores, restaurants, and other businesses representing the county's cultural diversity. East of Westmont, Columbia Pike has a partial cloverleaf interchange with SR 27 (Washington Boulevard) that provides access to both directions of I-395 (Henry G. Shirley Memorial Highway) at the western end of the mixing bowl interchange of the Pentagon road network. The state highway passes to the south of Henderson Hall, the headquarters of the United States Marine Corps. At the United States Air Force Memorial, Columbia Pike becomes a divided highway, passes through an S-curve, and briefly follows the southern edge of the Arlington National Cemetery reservation. Just to the east, the SR 244 designation resumes and the road has another partial cloverleaf interchange with SR 27 that provides access to southbound I-395. SR 244 reaches its eastern terminus at the eastern end of the interchange at the entrance to the Pentagon South parking lot.

== History ==
Columbia Pike dates to 1810 when the U.S. Congress chartered a turnpike Company to build three separate roads through the newly formed District of Columbia to outlying destinations. One of these roads was to be built through a portion of the District of Columbia that had previously been part of Virginia. This portion was then known as Alexandria County, D.C. (now Arlington County, Virginia). The purpose of this road was to provide access westward from the new Long Bridge that predated the 14th Street Bridge complex to the Little River Turnpike Road, now Virginia State Route 236. The new road was built on a pre-existing cow path as the Washington Graveled Turnpike and was also known as the Washington Road, the Columbian Road, and the Arlington Turnpike. The U.S. Department of Agriculture paved the road with concrete in 1928 from the bridge west to Palmer's Hill in Barcroft as part of an experimental testing program.

Columbia Pike was first numbered as State Route 720 in 1930 from U.S. Route 1 near the Long Bridge west for around 1 mile (1.6 km). In the 1933 renumbering, it was renumbered State Route 244 and the numbering was extended first to State Route 7 at Bailey's Crossroads and then, between 1934 and 1937, further west to its current terminus at SR 236 in Annandale. With the construction of the Pentagon Columbia Pike was replaced by the Shirley Highway as the Virginia approach to the Long Bridge/14th Street Bridge. By 1944, SR 244 was truncated at the Pentagon; the piece curving away from the original alignment became a state highway in 1964. Until the 1990s, Columbia Pike accommodated rush hour traffic by reversing the direction of one lane using overhead signals.

In 2002, Arlington County adopted the Columbia Pike Initiative, a revitalization plan for the three-and-a-half mile corridor in Arlington. The plan called for development of a high-capacity transit system. The Columbia Pike Initiative was followed in 2003 by adoption of the Form Based Code, which guides development along Columbia Pike. In 2004, the Columbia Pike Street Space Planning Task Force recommended future transit operate in mixed traffic and that the transitway be located in the curb lanes.

Recent efforts by the Columbia Pike Revitalization Organization include the replacement of older traffic signals with newer and more aesthetic ones, and the addition of brick texture to crosswalks. County officials also teamed up with the Washington Metropolitan Area Transit Authority to increase mass transit service along the corridor. This new program called Pike Ride remodeled bus stops and doubled bus frequency along Columbia Pike.

In 2006, the Arlington County and Fairfax County Board of Supervisors approved plans to bring streetcars to Columbia Pike along an either a five or six mile stretch from the Pentagon to the Skyline area. VDOT, however, refused to allow a streetcar on a primary route and associated redevelopment projects were delayed by the lengthy review and oversight processes required for state-maintained routes, creating friction with the Arlington County government. Thus, by their request, 3.3 miles (5.3 km) of SR 244—nearly its entire length in the county—were removed from the primary state highway system at the September 2010 meeting of Commonwealth Transportation Board. It is now the unsigned County Route 23, a part of Arlington's locally maintained road system. 0.37 miles (0.60 km) of Columbia Pike, containing the eastern interchange with SR 27, remain in the primary system as a discontinuous segment of SR 244. Though the streetcar project was cancelled in 2014, the length has never been returned to the system. However, SR 244 continues to be fully posted as a through route in Arlington as its signs were never removed.

In 2016, Arlington County proposed a "premium transit network" down Columbia Pike, using frequent buses in mixed traffic (not dedicated lanes) and purpose-built stops in place of streetcars. The westernmost third of the proposed twenty-four bus stops are open as of summer 2024.

== Major intersections ==
County	Location	mi	km	Destinations	Notes
Fairfax	Annandale	0.00	0.00	SR 236 west (Little River Turnpike) – Fairfax	Western terminus; access from westbound SR 244 to westbound SR 236 only
Fairfax	Annandale	0.10	0.16	Backlick Road (SR 617 south) / Maple Place (SR 758) - Falls Church	east end of one-way westbound section
Fairfax	Annandale			To SR 236 east / SR 617 / I-495 / John Marr Drive / Chatelain Road (SR 2948) – Springfield, Alexandria	
Fairfax	Belvedere			SR 613 (Sleepy Hollow Road)	
Fairfax	Belvedere			SR 613 (Lincolnia Road) – Lincolnia	
Fairfax	Belvedere			Braddock Road (SR 620)	
Fairfax	Bailey's Crossroads	4.06	6.53	SR 7 (Leesburg Pike) / to Seminary Road (SR 716) – Falls Church, Alexandria	Partial cloverleaf interchange
Fairfax	Bailey's Crossroads	4.58	7.37	Arlington County line	Eastern terminus
1.000 mi = 1.609 km; 1.000 km = 0.621 mi: Incomplete access

== Columbia Pike Trail ==
Near Lake Barcroft in Fairfax County, a 0.5 mile long trail called the Columbia Pike Trail runs along the south side of the pike. The trail runs from Firehouse Lane in Bailey's Crossroads to Mary Meindl Court In Lincolnia. The first section of the trail, from Lincolnia to just short of Powell Lane was completed in 2001 when a 184 long bridge over Holmes Run was completed. Prior to 2007, the section from Powell to Firehouse was built. In 2007 the Holmes Run Trail was extended to connect to the Columbia Pike Trail. In 2012, the gap between Holmes and Run and Powell Lane was closed. In June 2017, the trail section between Powell and Madison was widened and rebuilt at a new grade.

< SR 719	District 7 State Routes; 1928–1933	SR 721 >
