= Wilson Boulevard–Vienna Line =

Bus route in Washington, D.C., United States

1A, 1B
- Wilson Boulevard–Vienna Line

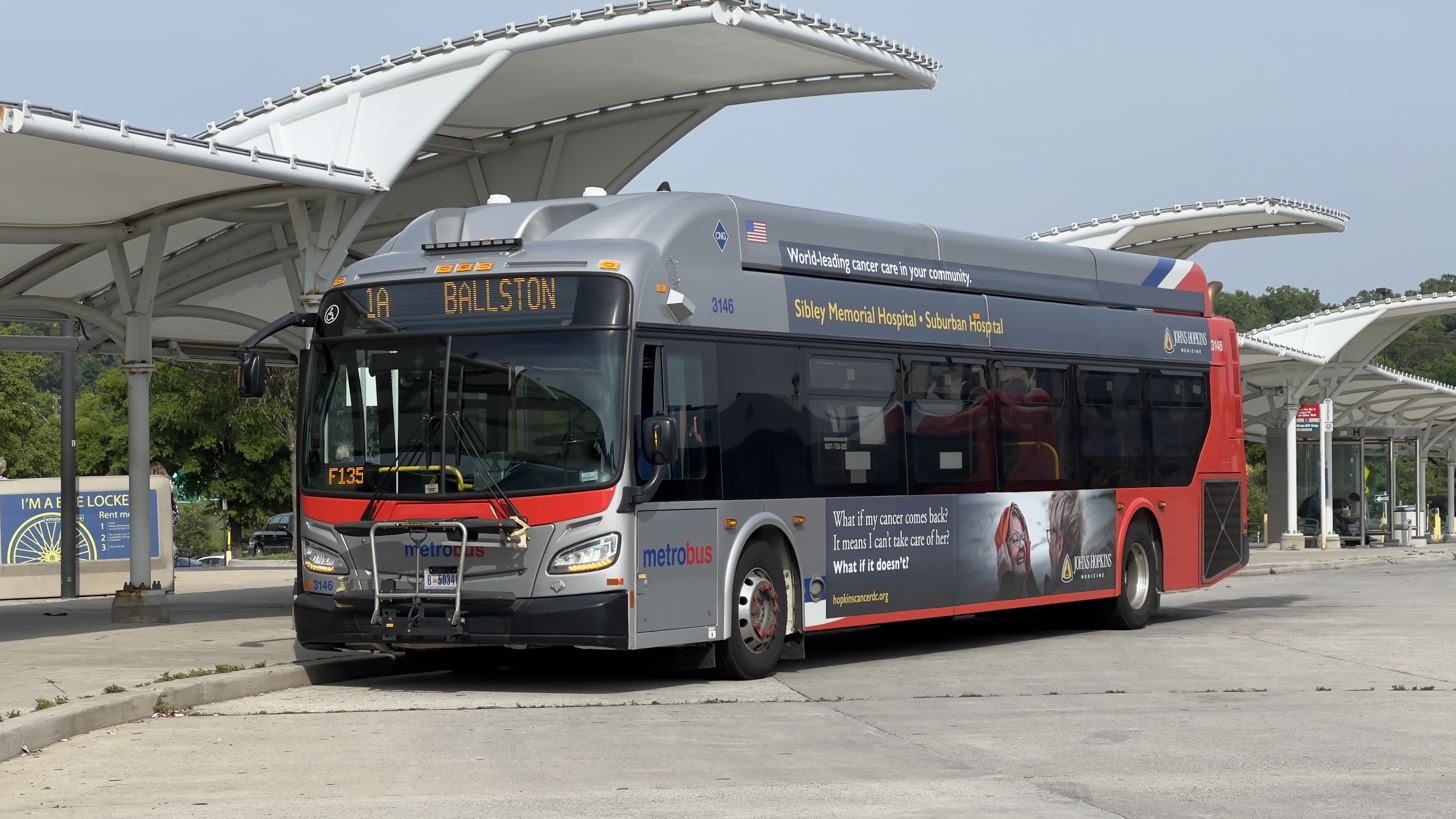
- Route 1A at Vienna Metro Station

Overview
- System: Metrobus
- Operator: Washington Metropolitan Area Transit Authority
- Garage: Four Mile Run
- Livery: Local
- Status: Merged with routes 1C and 2B, and replaced by routes F60 and F61
- Began service: 1920
- Ended service: 1A, 1B: June 29, 2025; 1D: June 24, 2007; 1E: August 21, 2016; 1F: December 29, 2013; 1Z: June 26, 2016

Route
- Locale: Fairfax County; Arlington County
- Communities served: Vienna, Oakton (Fairfax), Woodburn, Merrifield, Dunn Loring, West Falls Church, Seven Corners, Boulevard Manor, Bluemont, Ballston
- Landmarks served: Vienna station, Dunn Loring station, Inova Fairfax Hospital, Seven Corners Transit Center, Ballston Quarter, Ballston–MU station
- Start: Vienna station (1A); Dunn Loring station (1B)
- Via: Arlington Boulevard, Wilson Boulevard
- End: Ballston–MU station

Service
- Level: Daily
- Frequency: 20 minutes (7:00 AM - 9:00 PM); 30 - 60 minutes (After 9:00 PM)
- Operates: 4:54 AM – 2:00 AM
- Ridership: 955,880 (1A, FY 2024); 150,564 (1B, FY 2024)
- Transfers: SmarTrip only
- Timetable: Wilson Boulevard–Vienna Line

The Wilson Boulevard–Vienna Line, designated as Route 1A, or Route 1B, were daily bus routes operated by the Washington Metropolitan Area Transit Authority between Vienna station (1A) or Dunn Loring station (1B) of the Orange Line of the Washington Metro and Ballston–MU station of the Orange and Silver lines of the Washington Metro.

The line provided service within the neighborhoods of Vienna, Merrifield and Ballston in Fairfax and Arlington counties. Alongside the neighborhoods, it also brought service through the marketplace, business, and offices within the counties.

== Route Description and Service ==
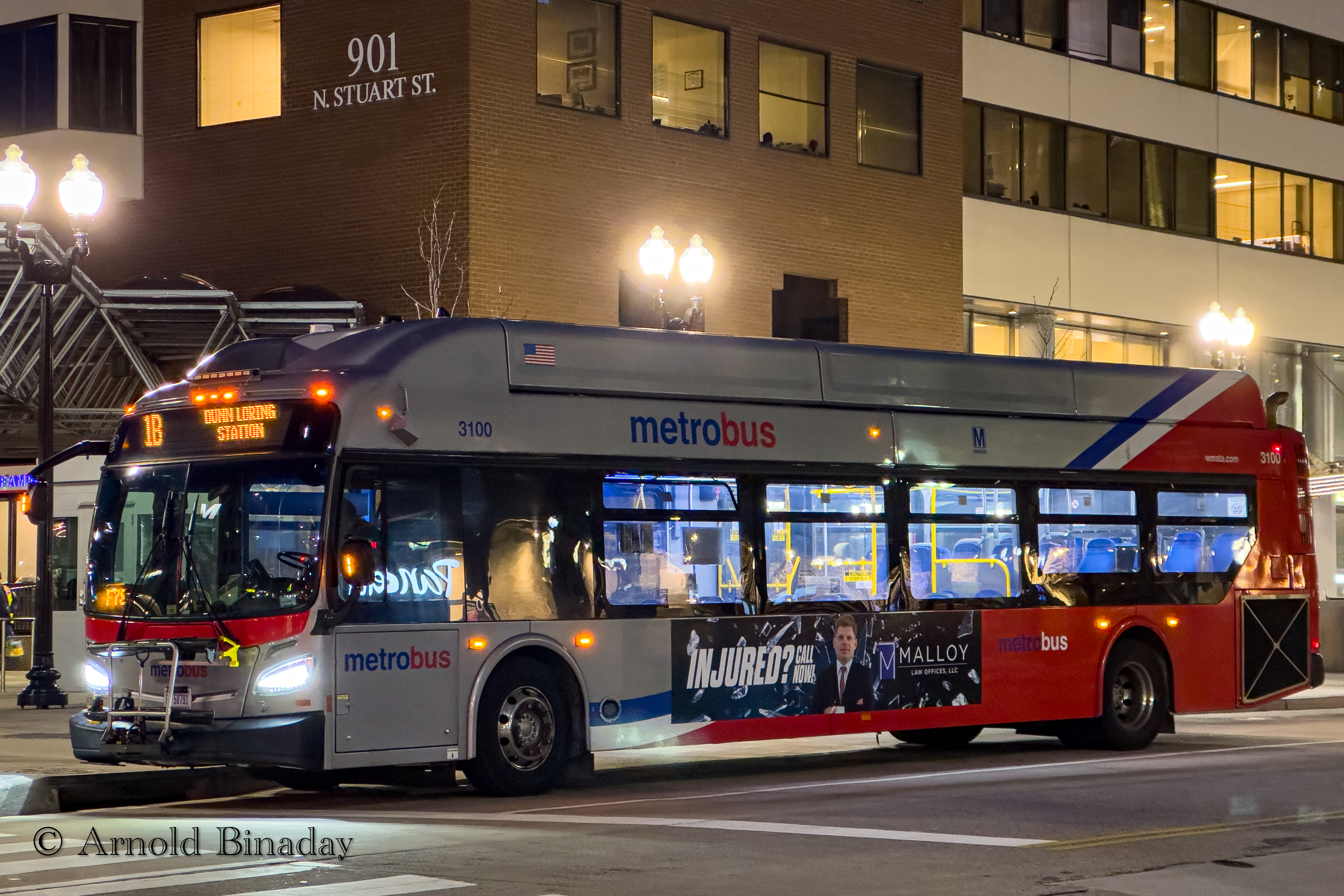
Route 1B at Ballston–MU station

The 1A and 1B operated from Four Mile Run division on a daily schedule. Route 1A operated daily between Vienna and Ballston stations via Arlington Boulevard and Wilson Boulevard. The 1A ran through the neighborhoods in Fairfax County, such as Vienna, Woodburn, West Falls Church, and Seven Corners within Arlington Boulevard. The 1A also ran through the neighborhoods in Arlington County, such as Boulevard Manor and Bluemont. Route 1B operated during weekday peak hours between Dunn Loring and Ballston stations. The 1B joined the route on Arlington Boulevard through the intersection of Fairview Park Drive. Unlike route 1A, the 1B skipped Seven Corners Transit Center on all trips.

== History ==
The Wilson Boulevard–Vienna Line was introduced in 1920, as the route was part of the Washington Virginia & Maryland Coach Company. It is one of the three oldest routes in Virginia, alongside the Columbia Pike Line from the Alexandria, Barcroft and Washington Transit Company (AB&W), which opened a year later in 1921. It was later operated by WMATA in 1973, when it acquired all routes from the AB&W and the WV&M. Since 1973, the Wilson Boulevard–Vienna Line consists of all 1 line. The 1 line provides reliable service within Fairfax and Arlington counties to connect from neighborhoods, to marketplaces, to landmarks, and to business. Although, the Wilson Boulevard–Vienna Line has various names prior to the current name throughout the years.

=== Wilson Boulevard Line ===
The initial name of the Wilson Boulevard–Vienna Line was the Wilson Boulevard Line, which was the original name since the beginning of service. The Wilson Boulevard Line consists of routes 1A, 1B, 1E, 1F, 1M, 1V, 1W, and 1X. All 8 routes of the 1 line operated on various schedules, and on different roads.

In 1983, the Wilson Boulevard Line splits into two route segments, the Wilson Boulevard–Annandale Line and the Wilson Boulevard–Fairfax Line. Routes 1A, 1B, 1E, 1M, 1V, and 1W operated under the Wilson Boulevard–Annandale Line, with the addition of Route 1D. Routes 1F and 1X operated under the Wilson Boulevard–Fairfax Line, with the addition of Routes 1C and 1Z. At some point in the 1980s and the 1990s, the Wilson Boulevard–Annandale Line, was discontinued, eliminating routes 1A, 1M, 1V, and 1W. This results the remaining routes of the lines, the 1A, 1B, and 1E to be merged to the Wilson Boulevard–Fairfax Line. On the other hand, the 1X was also discontinued along with routes 1A, 1M, 1V, and 1W.

Since the early 1990s, the Wilson Boulevard–Fairfax Line follows the same routes as the previous lines, with no changes on its route segments. Routes 1D, 1E and 1Z operates during weekday peak hours, while route 1B operates from Monday to Saturday, and routes 1C operates daily. Route 1F operates during weeknights, early morning and on Sundays. The 1B and 1D runs between Dunn Loring and Ballston stations. Although the 1D runs via the neighborhood of Dominion Hills. Route 1E runs during peak hours between Seven Corners Transit station and Ballston station, following the same path as the 1D. The 1F runs the same intervals as the 1E, although the 1F does not serve the neighborhood of Dominion Hills. Select 1F trips operates through Fairfax Circle. The 1C and 1Z runs between Inova Fair Oaks Hospital and Ballston station. The 1Z runs during weekday peak hours, with nonstop service between Bluemont Park and Ballston station with passenger boarding and alighting restrictions.

All routes remained unchanged until June 24, 2007, when the line discontinues one route, the 1D. Alongside with these changes, the Wilson Boulevard–Fairfax Line once again splits into two lines, with route 1C, to form the new Dunn Loring–Fair Oaks Line, and routes 1B, 1C, 1E, 1F, and 1Z transferred to the Wilson Boulevard Line. The eastern half of route 1C was taken over by the 1A following these changes.

The Wilson Boulevard Line returned in service on June 24, 2007, as major changes was made to the line. Route 1A was brought back in service, taking over the eastern portion of the 1C. The new Wilson Boulevard Line modified its schedules for the 1B, which formerly operated from Monday to Saturday, now operates during weekday peak hours only. Route 1F remains unchanged from its route, although it will no longer operate to Fairfax Circle. Route 1F continues to operate during weeknights and on Sundays, until the route was eliminated on December 29, 2013. On the same day, the line was renamed to Wilson Boulevard–Vienna Line. Routes 1E and 1Z remains in service until 2016, when both routes was discontinued, leaving with the 1A and 1B left on the line.

On June 24, 2007, route 1D was discontinued to clear up bus bunching in the Wilson Boulevard Line. Route 1E continues to provide service to Dominion Hills, and route 1B to Dunn Loring station. Route 1C was transferred to the Dunn Loring–Fair Oaks Line. Route 1A replaced the eastern portion of the 1C following these changes. Route 1Z was truncated to Vienna station, but continues to run non-stop between Bluemont and Ballston station. Route 1F no longer operate late night trips to Fairfax Circle.

In 2010 during WMATA's FY2011 budget, WMATA proposed to discontinue the 1E service on Dominion Hills and convert all 1E trips to 1F trips. The merger of the 1E and 1F was to clear bus bunching in Wilson Boulevard in Arlington, as there are low ridership in Dominion Hills.

Route 1F would be retained and operate on full weekday peak hours and late night service following the elimination of the 1E. However, the 1F will continue to provide local service on Wilson Boulevard during peak hours.

The new Seven Corners Transit Center opened on January 22, 2012 next to Seven Corners Shopping Center. The 1A, 1B, 1E, and 1F was rerouted to serve the new transit center to connect with other routes. The schedules of these trips remains unchanged, however, the 1A and the 1F will no longer alternate terminals at Leesburg Pike.

In 2013 during WMATA's FY2014 budget, WMATA proposed to extend late night trips (1F) from Seven Corners Transit Center to Vienna station. However, the budget also proposed to convert all 1F trips to 1A trips. The merger of the 1A and 1F was to clear up bus bunching, as the 1F late night trip was a redundancy to the 1A trip between Seven Corners Transit Center and Ballston–MU station.

The reason why WMATA planned these changes, was to improve late evening and Sunday service to the residential areas along the Arlington Boulevard corridor west of Seven Corners, as the 1F did not operate between Seven Corners and Vienna station. It was also to bring in transportation service to Inova Fairfax Hospital during late night hours and on Sundays.

On December 29, 2013, Route 1F was discontinued to clear up bus bunching and low ridership. Alternate service is provided by route 1A.

Major changes occurred in the Wilson Boulevard–Vienna Line in 2016. On June 26, 2016, Route 1Z was discontinued to clear up bus bunching, as the 1A follows the same path as the 1Z. This was to improve ridership on the Wilson Boulevard–Vienna Line, instead of having the 1Z dedicated for rush hours, while the 1A also operate during rush hours. The 1B will no longer serve Seven Corners Transit Center following these changes. On August 21, 2016, Route 1E was discontinued and is replaced by Arlington Transit route 54. ART 54 provides service via Washington Boulevard, where it connects to route 2A of the Washington Blvd.–Dunn Loring Line.

During the COVID-19 pandemic, all route 1B service was suspended and route 1A service was reduced to operate on its Saturday supplemental schedule beginning on March 16, 2020. However beginning on March 18, 2020, route 1A was further reduced to operate on its Sunday schedule. Service on weekends were also suspended. On August 23, 2020, route 1A had their normal weekday schedule restored with route 1B remaining suspended.

On September 10, 2020 as part of its FY2022 proposed budget, WMATA proposed to eliminate route 1B service to reduce costs and low federal funds. Route 1B has not operated since March 17, 2020 due to Metro's response to the COVID-19 pandemic.

On September 5, 2021, Route 1A was increased to operate every 20 minutes daily between 7 AM and 9 PM. Route 1B was also fully restored on the same day.

Due to rising cases of the COVID-19 Omicron variant, Route 1A was reduced to its Saturday service on weekdays and all 1B service was suspended once again. Full weekday service resumed on February 7, 2022.

As part of WMATA's Better Bus Redesign taking place on June 29, 2025, the line was turned into three different routes named the F60, F61, and F62.

The F60 combined both the 1A (between Ballston and Inova Fairfax Hospital) and 1C (between Fair Oaks Mall and Inova Fairfax Hospital), however the route no longer serves either Dunn Loring or Vienna stations, essentially restoring the 1C's former routing before June 2007. The F61 follows the former 1A between Ballston and Vienna and was also combined with the 2B between Vienna and Fair Oaks Mall, following the entirety of the former 2B. The F62 follows a modified 1B routing between Dunn Loring and Seven Corners Transit Center via Merrilee Drive, then operates on the former 4B route between Seven Corners and Rosslyn station. Additional service between Ballston and Seven Corners is also provided by an extended Route 38B (renamed into the A58).
