= Fair Oaks–Fairfax Boulevard Line =

Bus route in Virginia, United States

1C
- Fair Oaks–Fairfax Boulevard Line

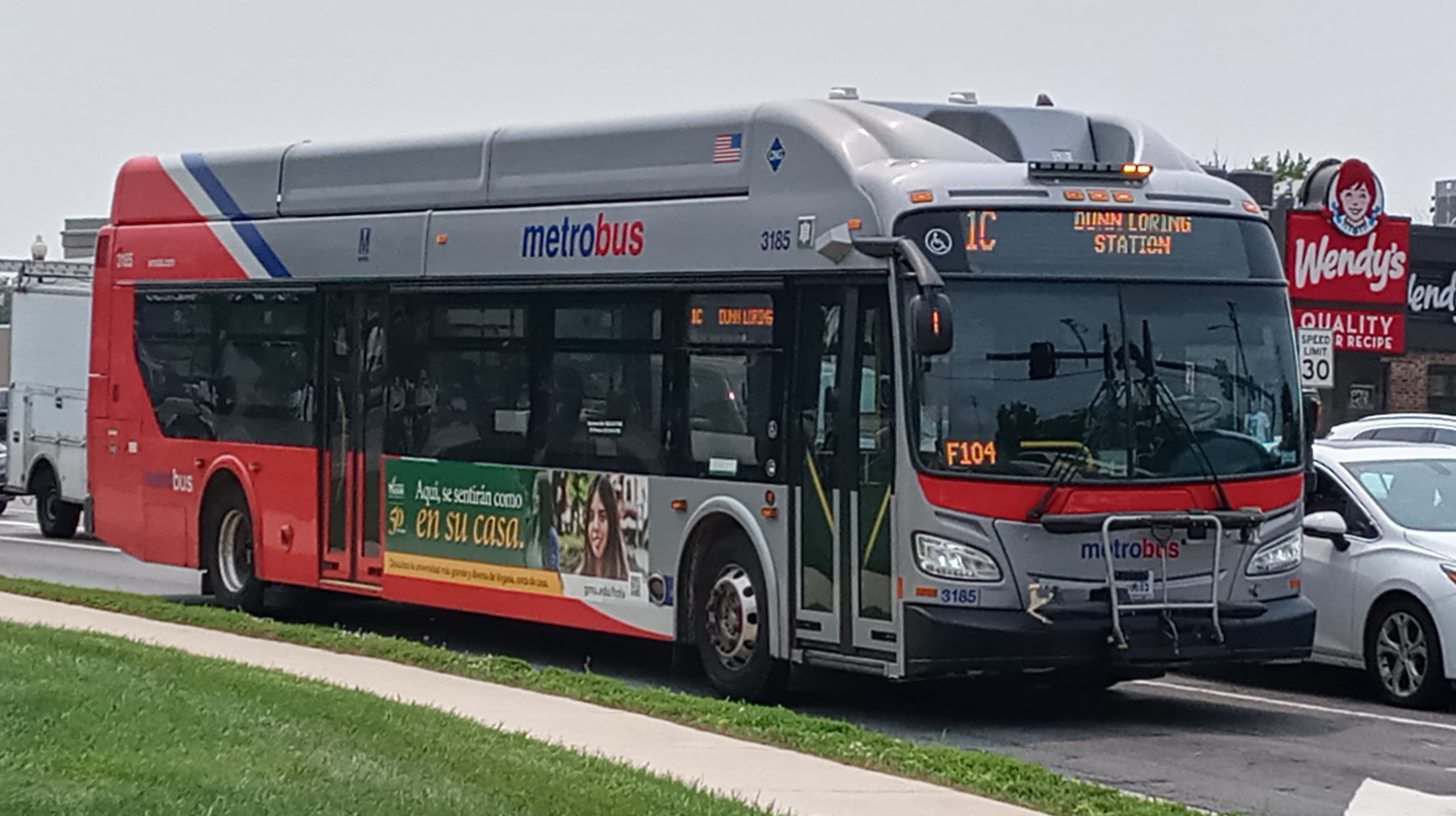
- Route 1C in the City of Fairfax

Overview
- System: Metrobus
- Operator: Washington Metropolitan Area Transit Authority
- Garage: Four Mile Run
- Livery: Local
- Status: Merged with routes 1A/1B, and replaced by routes F60 and F61
- Began service: June 24, 2007
- Ended service: June 29, 2025

Route
- Locale: Fairfax County; City of Fairfax
- Communities served: Dunn Loring, Merrifield, Woodburn, City of Fairfax, Kamp Washington, Fair Oaks
- Landmarks served: Dunn Loring station, Inova Fairfax Hospital, Fair Oaks Mall
- Start: Dunn Loring station
- Via: Arlington Boulevard, Fairfax Boulevard
- End: McConnell Public Safety and Transportation Operations Center (Weekdays); Fair Oaks Mall (Weekends)

Service
- Level: Daily
- Frequency: 30 minutes (Weekday Service); 60 minutes (Weekends and Daily Evening Service)
- Operates: 4:00 AM – 12:26 AM (Weekdays); 6:25 AM – 11:35 PM (Saturdays); 7:20 AM – 11:09 PM (Sundays)
- Ridership: 216,980 (FY 2024)
- Transfers: SmarTrip only
- Timetable: Fair Oaks–Fairfax Boulevard Line

The Fair Oaks–Fairfax Boulevard Line, designated as Route 1C, was a daily bus route operated by the Washington Metropolitan Area Transit Authority between the Dunn Loring station of the Orange Line of the Washington Metro and McConnell Public Safety and Transportation Operations Center on the weekdays and Fair Oaks Mall on the weekends. This line provided service within the neighborhoods of Merrifield and Fair Oaks in Fairfax County and the City of Fairfax. Trips were roughly 30 minutes on weekdays, and 60 minutes on weekends.

== Route Description and Service ==
The 1C operated from Four Mile Run division on a daily schedule. The 1C operated on weekdays between Dunn Loring station and McConnell Public Safety and Transportation Operations Center via Arlington Boulevard and Fairfax Boulevard. During the weekends, the 1C operated on a shortened route, only operating up to Fair Oaks Mall. The 1C ran through the neighborhoods in Fairfax County, such as Merrifield and Woodburn, within Arlington Boulevard. The 1C also ran through marketplaces and businesses in Fairfax County and the City of Fairfax.

== History ==
Route 1C was initially part of the Wilson Boulevard–Fairfax Line, when the route was introduced in 1983 following the split of the Wilson Boulevard Line. The 1C served the line without any route changes until June 24, 2007, when the 1C splits from the Wilson Boulevard–Fairfax Line.

=== Fair Oaks–Dunn Loring Line ===
The original name of the line that operated the 1C was the Fair Oaks–Dunn Loring Line. The 1C operates between Dunn Loring station and Fair Oaks Mall. The 1C have select trips that operates up to Fairfax Circle during early morning and weeknight trips. Throughout the years, the 1C remains the same until the line changes its name to Fair Oaks–Fairfax Boulevard Line on December 29, 2013, following its extension to McConnell Public Safety and Transportation Operations Center.

=== Changes ===
On June 24, 2007, the 1C no longer operates to Ballston station, as the route was truncated to Dunn Loring station. The eastern half was replaced by the 1A. The 1C originally operated alongside the 1Z during rush hours, and following these changes, the 1Z follows rush hour times with the 1A.

In 2013, WMATA proposed an extension to the 1C.

Prior to the budget proposal, WMATA planned to reroute the 1C from Lee Jackson Memorial Highway to Random Hills Road before arriving to Fair Oaks Mall. Along with the road changes, it was also proposed to extend the 1C to McConnell Public Safety and Transportation Operations Center to bring in connection to other bus routes. This extension leads to serve the Fair Oaks Mall stops in both directions.

WMATA later revised the proposal by rerouting the 1C from Lee Jackson Memorial Highway to Fairfax County Government Center via Government Center Parkway before arriving to Fair Oaks Mall. The 1C extension remains the same from the original proposal.

The reason why WMATA planned these changes, was to bring in more service to Lee Highway, the neighborhood of Fair Oaks, and the Fairfax County Government Center, alongside service to West Ox Road.

On December 29, 2013, the 1C extended to serve McConnell Public Safety and Transportation Operations Center in Fair Oaks. The 1C only serves this stop during weekdays, as the 1C operates up to Fair Oaks Mall during the weekends. The short late night and early trips to Fairfax Circle is discontinued.

In 2016 during WMATA's FY2018 budget, it was proposed to eliminate route 1C to reduce costs and has a high subsidy per rider. According to performance measure it goes as the following for WMATA:

Performance Measures	Route 1C	WMATA Guideline	Pass/Fail
Average Weekday Riders	973	432	Pass
Cost Recovery	15.12%	16.6%	Fail
Subsidy per Rider	$6.57	$4.81	Fail
Riders per Trip	18.5	10.7	Pass
Riders per Revenue Mile	1.3	1.3	Pass

However, the official service changes on June 26, 2016, remains unchanged for the 1C, as trip times was adjusted to make the 1C reliable.

During the COVID-19 pandemic, all route 1C service was reduced to operate on its Saturday supplemental schedule beginning on March 16, 2020. However beginning on March 18, 2020, the route was further reduced to operate on its Sunday schedule. Service on weekends were also suspended. On August 23, 2020, route 1C had weekend service restored but service to McConnell Public Safety and Transportation Operations Center remained suspended .

On September 10, 2020, as part of its FY2022 proposed budget, WMATA proposed to truncate route 1C service to Fair Oaks Mall in order to reduce costs and low federal funds. WMATA also proposed to reduce weekday frequency on the 1C.

On March 14, 2021, the weekday 1C trips was truncated back to Fair Oaks Mall, no longer operating to McConnell Public Safety and Transportation Operations Center due to the closure of the West Ox Division. The weekend 1C routing remains unchanged, but with the Saturday eastbound trip leaving at 6:25 AM eliminated, making both Saturday & Sunday the same schedule times.

On September 5, 2021, all 1C service to West Ox Road & Alliance Drive was eliminated. Service was also restored to pre-pandemic schedule.

Due to rising cases of the COVID-19 Omicron variant, this was reduced to its Saturday service on weekdays. Full weekday service resumed on February 7, 2022.

As part of WMATA's Better Bus Redesign taking place on June 29, 2025, route 1C was combined with the 1A and renamed into the F60, F61, and F62 (mimicking the former 1C routing to Ballston). The F60 essentially combined both the 1A (between Ballston and Inova Fairfax Hospital) and 1C (between Fair Oaks Mall and Inova Fairfax Hospital), but skips Dunn Loring and Vienna stations. Service to both stations was replaced by the F61 (Vienna) and F62 (Dunn Loring).
