= Bluemont =

Bluemont may be:

- Bluemont, Virginia
  - Bluemont Historic District
- Bluemont, Arlington, Virginia
  - Bluemont Junction
  - Bluemont Junction Trail
- Blue Mont Central College
- Bluemont Presbyterian Church and Cemetery

== See also ==
- Blue Mountain
