= Vienna Line =

Vienna Line may refer to:

- Orange Line (Washington Metro)
- Wiener Linien
- Wilson Boulevard–Vienna Line
