= Wilson Boulevard =

Wilson Boulevard may be:

- Wilson Boulevard (Arlington County)
- Virginia State Route 613 (Fairfax County)
