= Bluemont Junction =

Rail junction in Virginia, US, 1912–1968

Coordinates: 38°52′23″N 77°07′58″W

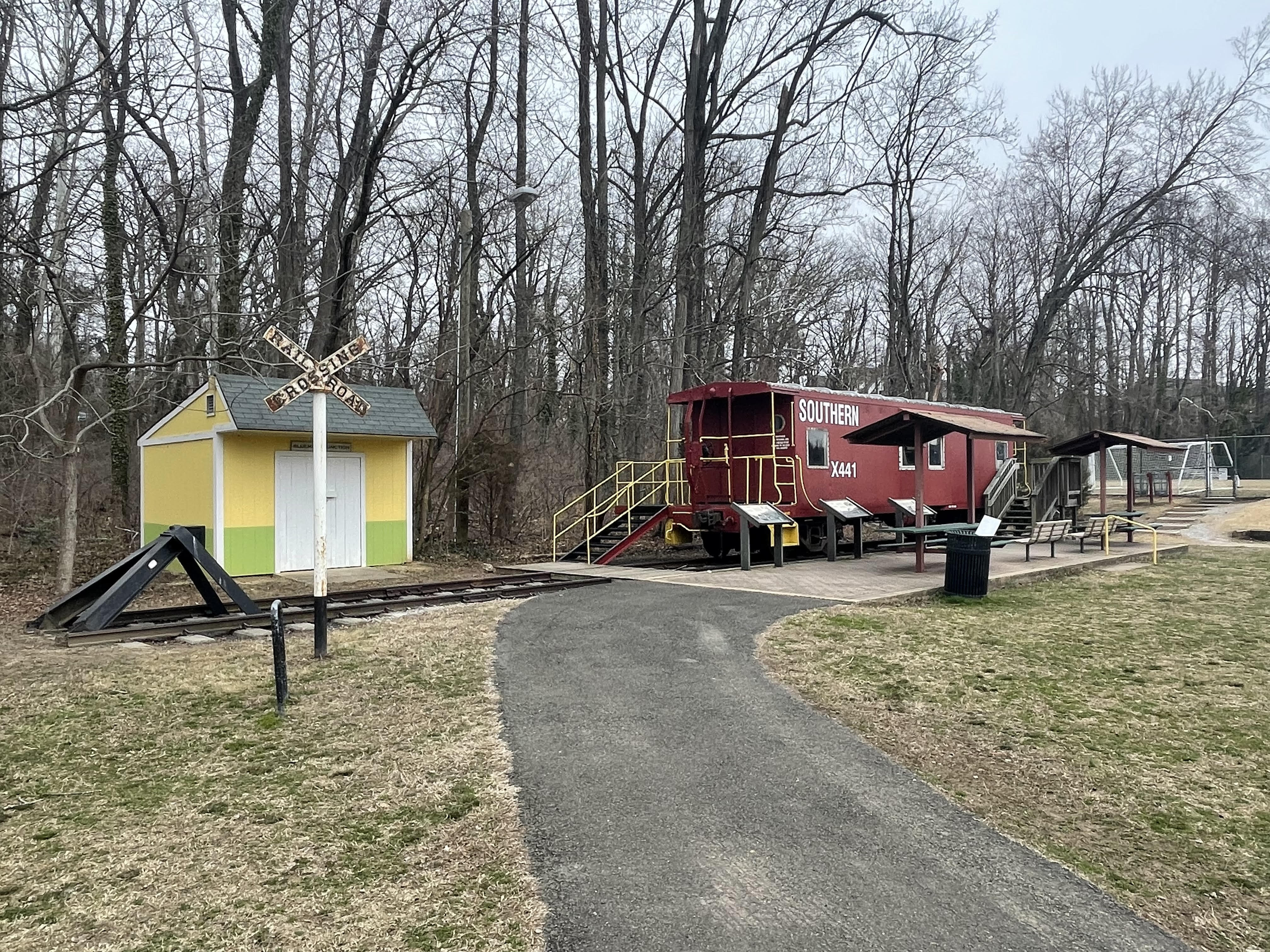
Bluemont Junction Park (February 2024)

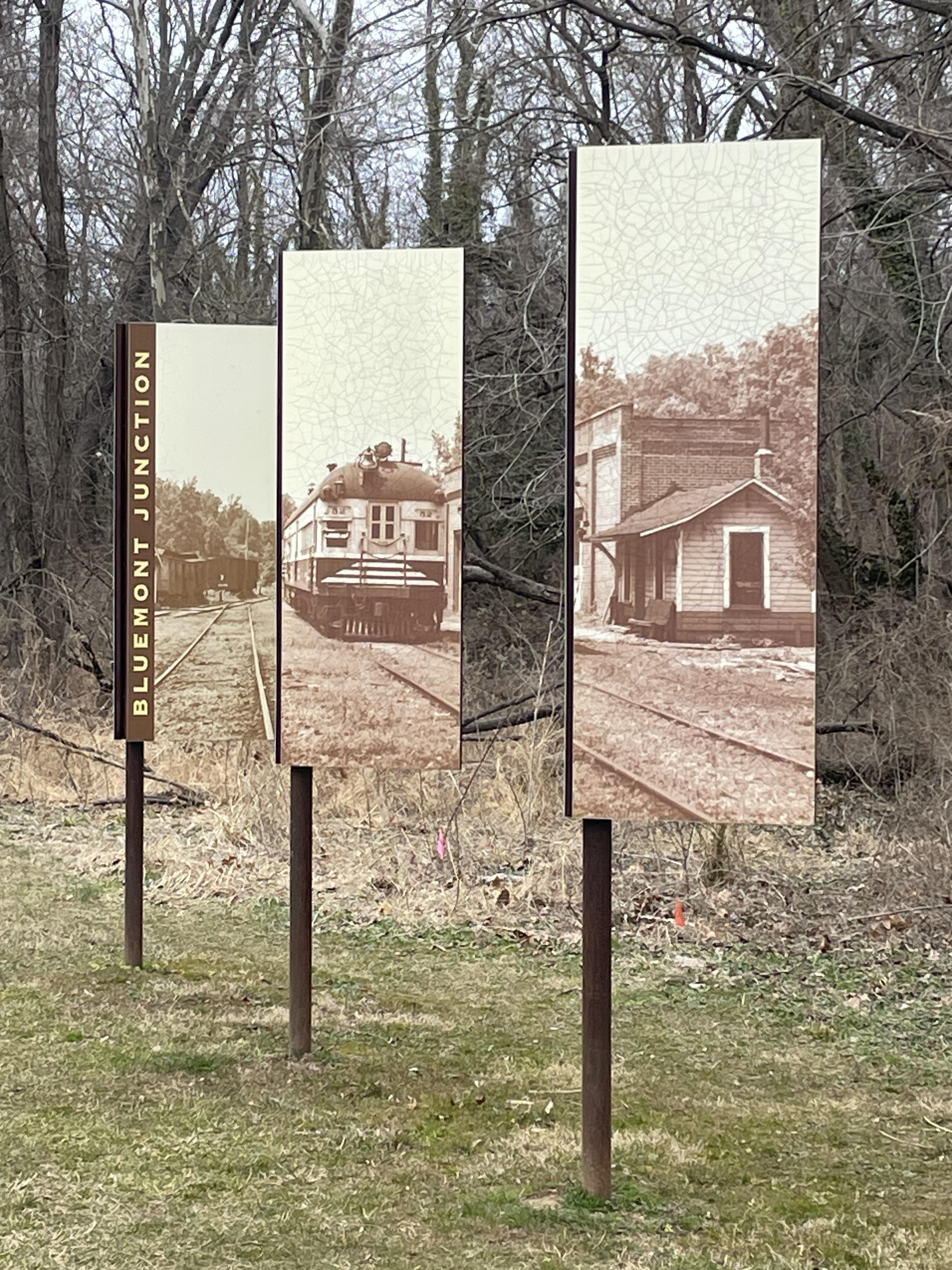
Park signs at the former junction (February 2024)

Bluemont Junction was part of the Washington and Old Dominion Railway that began operation in 1912. Located in Arlington County, Virginia's Bluemont neighborhood, the wye junction served as a transfer point for passengers and freight from Alexandria and Georgetown to points west ending at Bluemont, then a popular resort in the Blue Ridge Mountains.

== Background ==
The junction was part of the land purchased by the railroad that now contains the Bluemont Junction Trail. It was part of a planned connection between the railway's line that ran between Alexandria and the western Virginia town of Bluemont, and the line that travelled between Georgetown and Great Falls. Peak years of passenger service were from 1912 into the 1920s with trains running through the junction every 10–20 minutes. Passenger service ended in 1951, and in 1968 freight service ended with the end of the railroad.

The junction's site is now within Arlington County's Bluemont Junction Park. The site contains signage and a retired Southern Railway bay window caboose (Number X441).
