= Arlington County, Virginia, street-naming system =

Street-naming system

This article details the street-naming system of Arlington County, Virginia in the United States.

Although the streets of Arlington County are not laid out on a grid plan, its local streets follow sequential numbered or alphabetic patterns that are both rational and provide address numbering information.

== History of the system ==
A numbered and alphabetical street-naming scheme suggests that Arlington is or once was laid out on a continuous rectilinear grid plan, which in many parts of the County it is not (although very few parts of the county are laid out using the cul-de-sac type development which is more common in the outer Washington, DC suburbs). Originally, the various communities in the county had independent street-naming conventions. However, when county officials asked the United States Postal Service to place the entire county in a single "Arlington, Virginia" postal area, the USPS refused to do so until the county had a unified addressing system, which the county developed in 1932. For that reason, and also because Arlington contains a number of locations that interrupt the road grid network (including military facilities, parks, golf courses, and limited-access highways), it is common for streets to terminate and continue later on in another location. Arlington now has a policy of adding to the street grid when feasible as part of new development—for example, connections for Quinn Street and Troy Street were recently added to the Master Transportation Plan between Wilson and Clarendon Boulevards.

== Specifics of the system ==
Arlington Boulevard (U.S. Route 50) bisects Arlington County into northern and southern sections. The dividing line continues through Joint Base Myer–Henderson Hall even as Arlington Boulevard bypasses it to the north, resulting in streets in southern parts of Rosslyn being labeled north even though they are south of the physical boulevard at that location.

East–west streets are designated by an ordinal number followed by a designation as either a street, road, place, or avenue, and a north or south designation. The numbers begin on either side of Arlington Boulevard and increase moving away from it. Therefore, 1st Street North is immediately north of Arlington Boulevard and 1st Street South is immediately south of it.

North–south streets are named and alphabetized (through first letter only) starting at the Potomac River in the east. Progressing westward, the alphabetizing sequence is:

1. One-syllable names (Ball Street to Wayne Street)
2. Two-syllable names (Adams to Woodrow)
3. Three-syllable names (Abingdon to Yucatán)
4. Four-syllable names (Arizona)

Arlington's local numbered and named streets are not through streets, except for a few streets in North Arlington, and thus each number or name can appear multiple times at multiple locations in the county but always according to the grid. For example, there are several 12th Streets South or North Kensington Streets in various areas of the county. In cases where more names are needed to avoid confusion in areas of denser street construction, numbered (east–west) streets are first designated "street", then "road," then "place," and in one instance, "avenue". For example, 37th Street North, 37th Road North, and 37th Place North are all in the same general area. Named (north–south) local streets follow rules regarding initial letter and syllable number but there can be multiple street names with the same initial letter number of syllables, almost all ending with "street". For example, North Kenilworth Street, North Kensington Street, and North Kentucky Street are all in the same area.

== Exceptions to the system ==
Major arteries or historical roads are exempt from the naming and numbering system. Named streets with the designation "road," "pike," or "highway" instead of "street" usually predate the system and follow early winding routes. "Boulevards" and "drives" are generally major thoroughfares with historic names. Boulevards usually run east–west and drives, which were constructed on former trolley lines, run north–south but are designated as north and south only when they appear on both sides of Arlington Boulevard.

Notable exceptions include:

- Arlington Ridge Road
- Army Navy Drive
- Campbell Avenue
- Columbia Pike
- Nelly Custis Drive
- Patrick Henry Drive
- George Mason Drive
- Fort Myer Drive
- Glebe Road
- Richmond Highway (formerly Jefferson Davis Highway)
- Langston Boulevard (formerly Lee Highway)
- Military Road
- Pershing Drive
- Quaker Lane
- Walter Reed Drive

== Address numbers in the system ==
Address numbers can be determined from the numbers or names of intersecting streets. Addresses on north–south routes, including exceptions from the numbering and naming system, follow the numbers of intersecting (or implied intersections of) numbered streets. For example, 2005 South Glebe Road would lie just beyond the intersection of South Glebe Road and 20th Street South. Addresses on east–west, including exceptions from the numbering and naming system, are based on the intersecting (or implied intersections of) named streets with each letter/syllable combination representing 100 address numbers. The chart below shows the block numbers on east–west streets. Full-Lot houses often skip 4 numbers in between houses, and town homes generally skip two; while the opposite side of the street is offset by one number, so that one side can be even, and one odd.

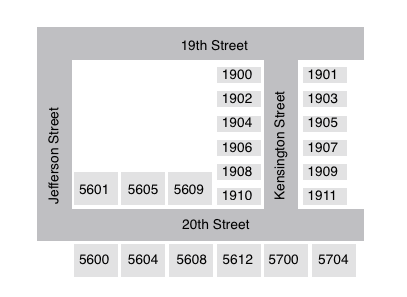
A fictional block with correctly numbered houses skipping four between full lots, and two between condos.

== Block numbers on east–west streets ==
- 200: Ball
- 300: Clark
- 400: (Dale)
- 500: Eads
- 600: Fern
- 700: Grant
- 800: Hayes
- 900: Ives
- 1000: Joyce
- 1100: Kent
- 1200: Lynn
- 1300: Meade
- 1400: Nash
- 1500: Oak
- 1600: Pierce
- 1700: Queen
- 1800: Rolfe
- 1900: Scott
- 2000: Taft
- 2100: Uhle
- 2200: Veitch
- 2300: Wayne
- 2400: Adams
- 2500: Barton
- 2600: Cleveland
- 2700: Danville
- 2800: Edgewood
- 2900: Fillmore
- 3000: Garfield
- 3100: Highland
- 3200: Irving
- 3300: Jackson
- 3400: Kenmore
- 3500: Lincoln
- 3600: Monroe
- 3700: Nelson
- 3800: Oakland
- 3900: Pollard
- 4000: Quincy
- 4100: Randolph
- 4200: Stafford
- 4300: Taylor
- 4400: Utah
- 4500: Vermont
- 4600: Wakefield
- 4700: Abingdon
- 4800: Buchanan
- 4900: Columbus
- 5000: Dinwiddie
- 5100: Edison
- 5200: Frederick
- 5300: Greenbrier
- 5400: Harrison
- 5500: Illinois
- 5600: Jefferson
- 5700: Kensington
- 5800: Lexington
- 5900: Madison
- 6000: Nottingham
- 6100: Ohio
- 6200: Powhatan
- 6300: Quantico
- 6400: Roosevelt
- 6500: Sycamore
- 6600: Tuckahoe
- 6700: Underwood
- 6800: Van Buren
- 6900: Westmoreland
- 7000: Arizona

Addresses on the south and west (left) sides of the streets are even-numbered. Below is a complete list of named (north–south) streets within the system.

== List of named (north–south) streets within the system ==
This list includes only those streets which appear as part of the naming system, excluding historical exceptions, and major boulevards or drives.

One syllable	Two syllables	Three syllables	Four syllables
	Adams	Aberdeen; Abingdon; Albemarle	Arizona
Ball; Bell	Barton; Bedford; Brookside; Bryan	Brandywine; Buchanan; Burlington	
Clark	Calvert; Cleveland	Cameron; Columbus; Culpepper	
Dale	Daniel; Danville	Delaware; Dickerson; Dinwiddie; Dumbarton	
Eads; Elm	Edgewood	Edison; Emerson; Evergreen	
Fern; Fox	Fenwick; Fillmore	Florida; Frederick	
Grant; Grove	Garfield	Galveston; Granada; Greenbrier; Greencastle	
Hayes; High; Hill	Hancock; Hartford; Harvard; Herndon; Highland; Hudson	Harrison; Hollister; Huntington	
Inge; Ives	Ivy; Irving	Illinois; Inglewood; Ivanhoe	
Joyce; June	Jackson; Johnson	Jacksonville; Jefferson	
Kent; Knoll; King	Kansas; Kenmore; Kenwood	Kenilworth; Kennebec; Kennesaw; Kensington; Kentucky	
Lang; Lynn	Langley; Lincoln; Lorton; Lowell	Lancaster; Larrimore; Lebanon; Lexington; Liberty; Littleton; Livingston; Lombardy; Longfellow	
Meade; Moore	Monroe	Madison; Manchester; McKinley; Montague; Montana	
Nash	Nelson; Norwood	Nicholas; Nottingham	
Oak; Ode; Orme	Oakland; Oxford	Ohio; Ottawa	
Pierce; Poe	Peary; Piedmont; Pollard	Pocomoke; Potomac; Powhatan	
Queen; Quinn	Quebec; Quincy	Quantico; Quesada; Quintana	
Rhodes; Rolfe	Radford; Randolph; Richmond; River; Rixey	Rochester; Rockingham; Roosevelt	
Scott; Smythe	Stafford; Stuart	Somerset; Sycamore	
Taft; Troy	Taylor; Tazewell; Thomas; Trenton	Tacoma; Toronto; Trinidad; Tuckahoe	
Uhle	Upland; Upshur; Upland; Utah	Underwood	
Vance; Veitch	Vermont; Vernon; Valley; Venice	Van Buren; Vanderpool; Venable	
Wayne; Wise	Wakefield; Woodley; Woodrow; Woodstock	Washington; Westmoreland; Winchester; Wyoming	
		Yucatán	
