= Bluemont, Arlington, Virginia =

Suburb in Arlington, Virginia

Bluemont, Arlington
- Neighborhood of Arlington
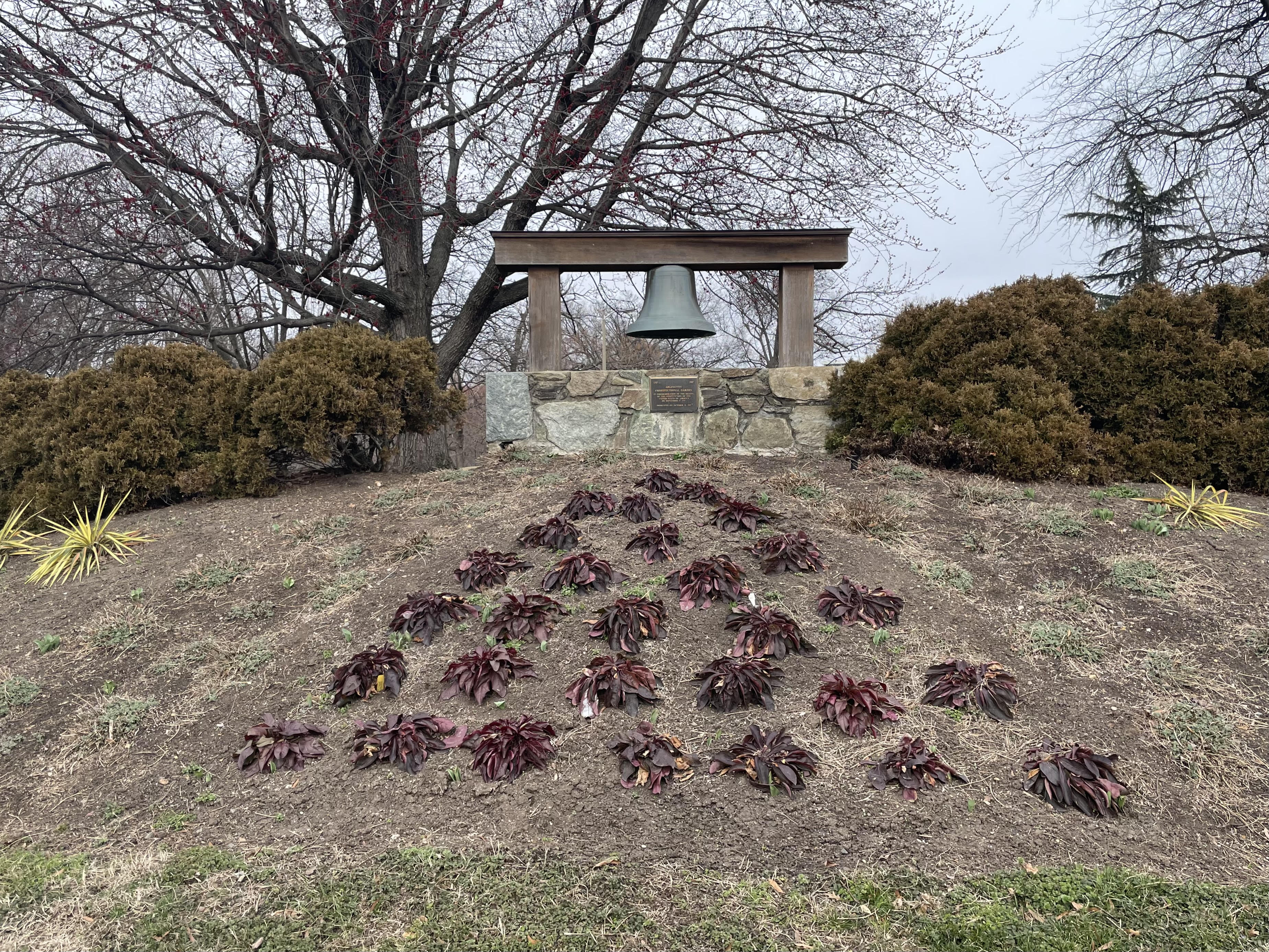
- Constitution Garden Park in Bluemont

- Location within Alexandria area
- Country: United States
- State: Virginia
- County: Arlington County
- Area code: 703

Bluemont is a suburban neighborhood in Arlington County, Virginia. As of 2020, the population is 7,049 people. The neighborhood is bounded on the north by Washington Boulevard and on the south by Carlin Springs Road. The western boundary is Four Mile Run and the eastern boundary is Glebe Road.

The neighborhood is bisected by both Interstate 66 and Wilson Boulevard. It sits on the western edge of the larger Ballston neighborhood.

== Background ==
The neighborhood gets its name from the old Bluemont Junction on the Alexandria-Bluemont line of the Washington and Old Dominion Railway.

== Demographics ==
As of 2020, 72.6% of Bluemont's population is white, 9.9% is Hispanic, 8.5% is Asian, 6.5% is mixed race, 2.4% is black, and 0.1% is other.

Bluemont has several subdivisions, including Brockwood, Lacey Forest, Brandon Village, and others.

== Education ==
Public school students attend Arlington Public Schools, including Ashlawn Elementary School, Kenmore Middle School, and Washington-Liberty High School.

== Points of Interest ==
The neighborhood is crossed by the Bluemont Junction Trail, along the path of the former Bluemont Branch of the Washington and Old Dominion Railroad. It is also the western end of the Custis Trail.

The community features the Arlington Traditional School, Lacy Woods Park, Bon Air Park, Bluemont Park, Fields Park, Balls Crossing, Saint Ann's Catholic Church, and West Ballston.

== Gallery ==
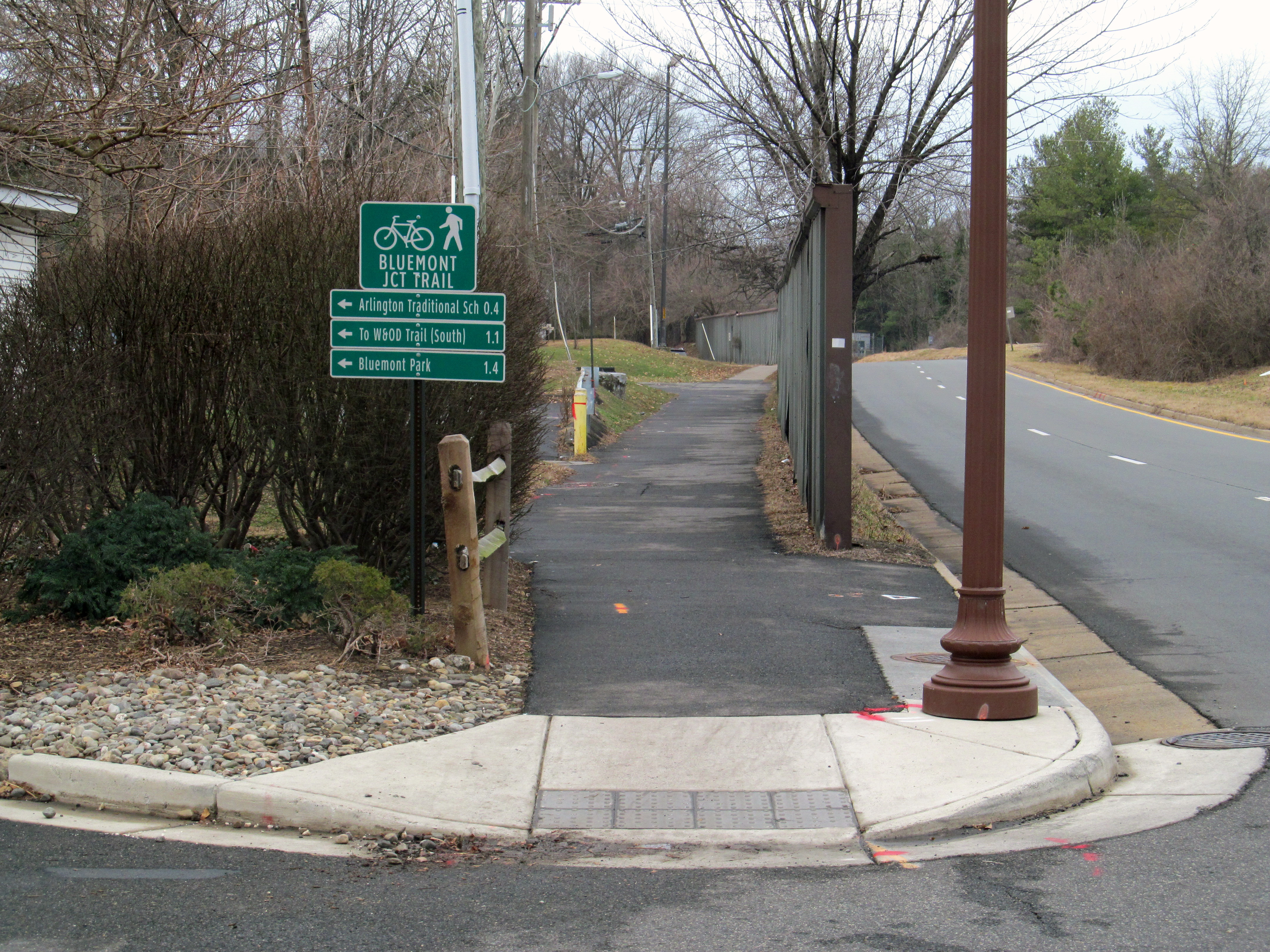
Bluemont Junction Trail

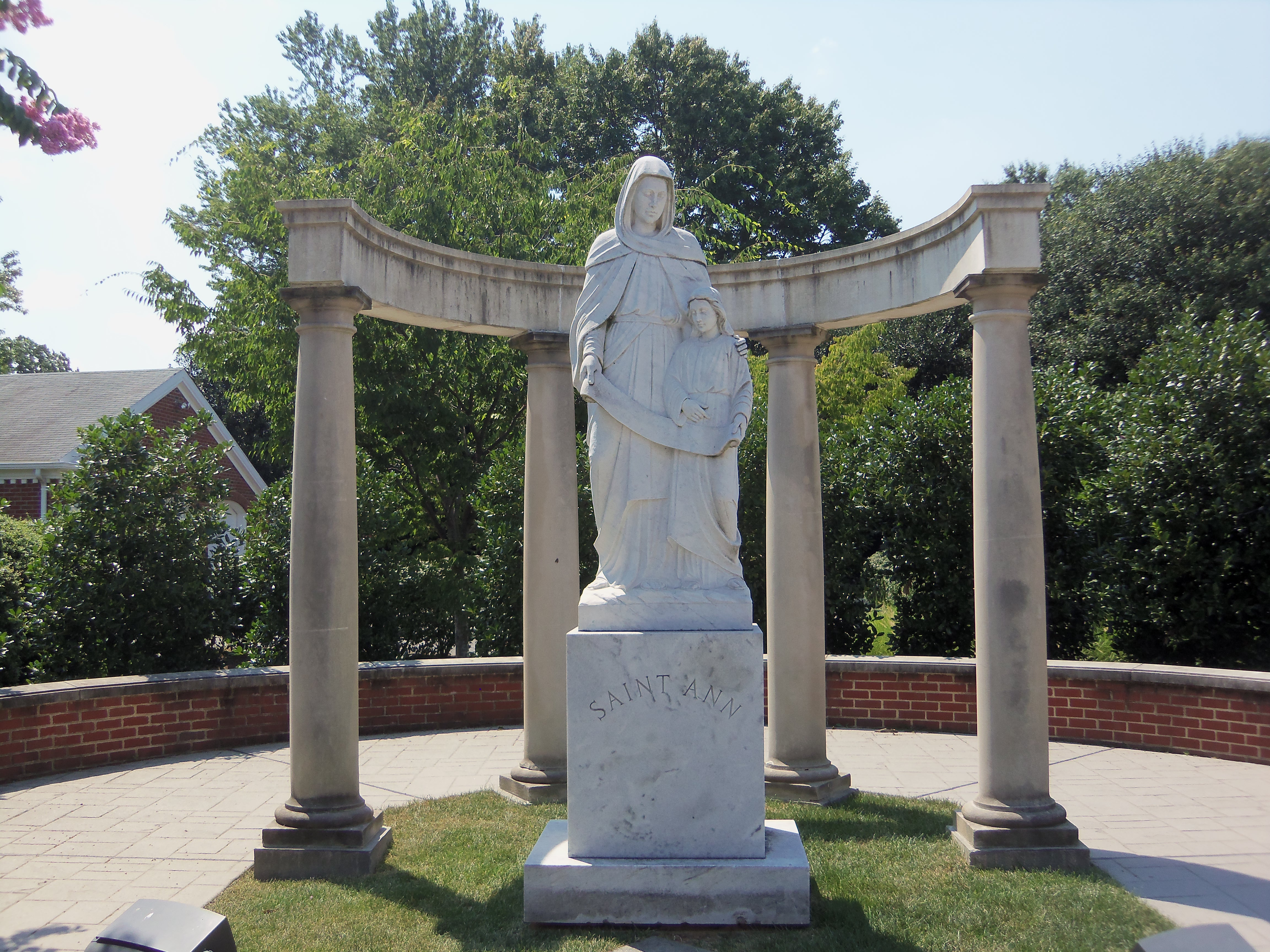
Saint Ann's Catholic Church

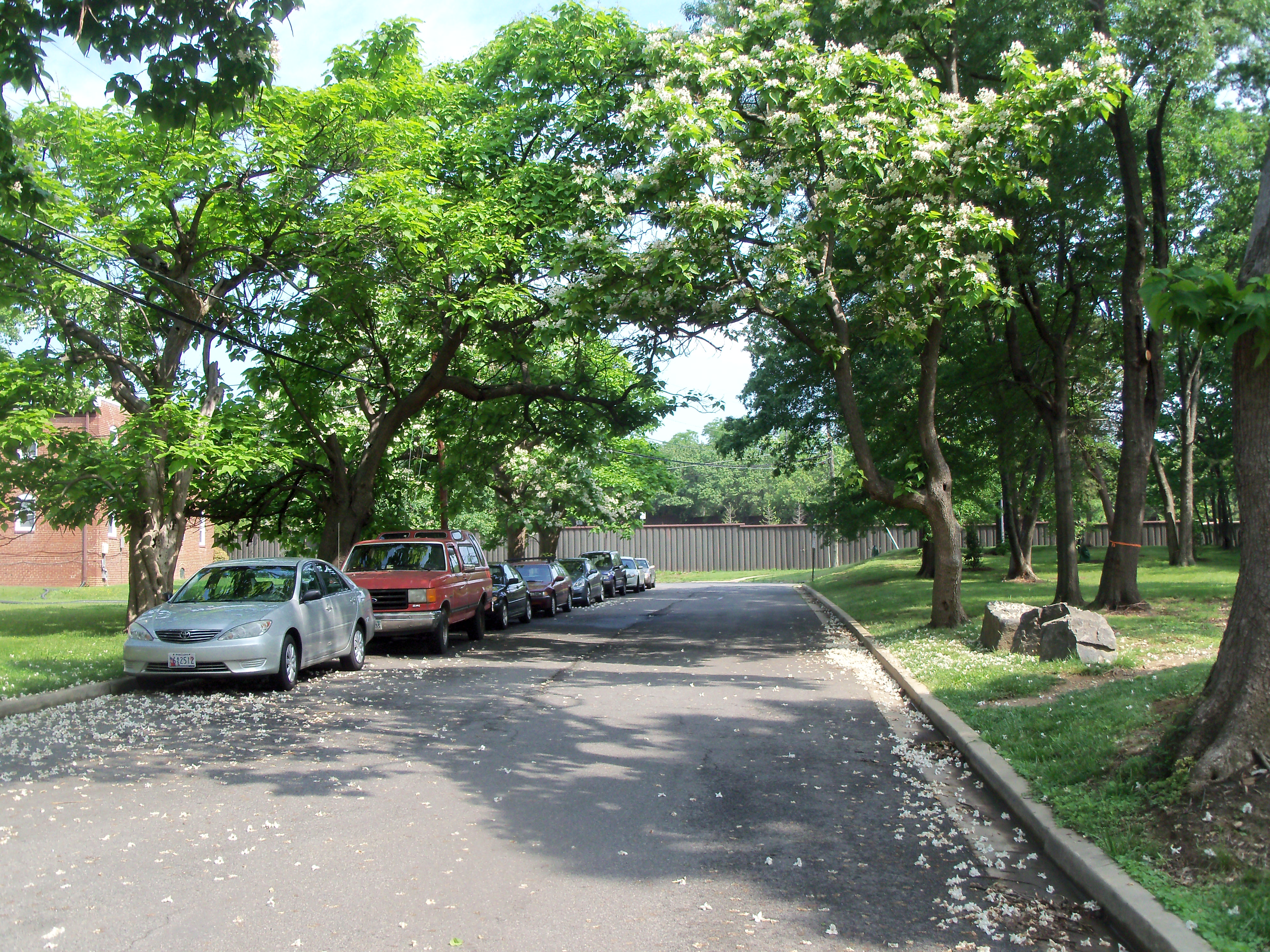
Neighborhood

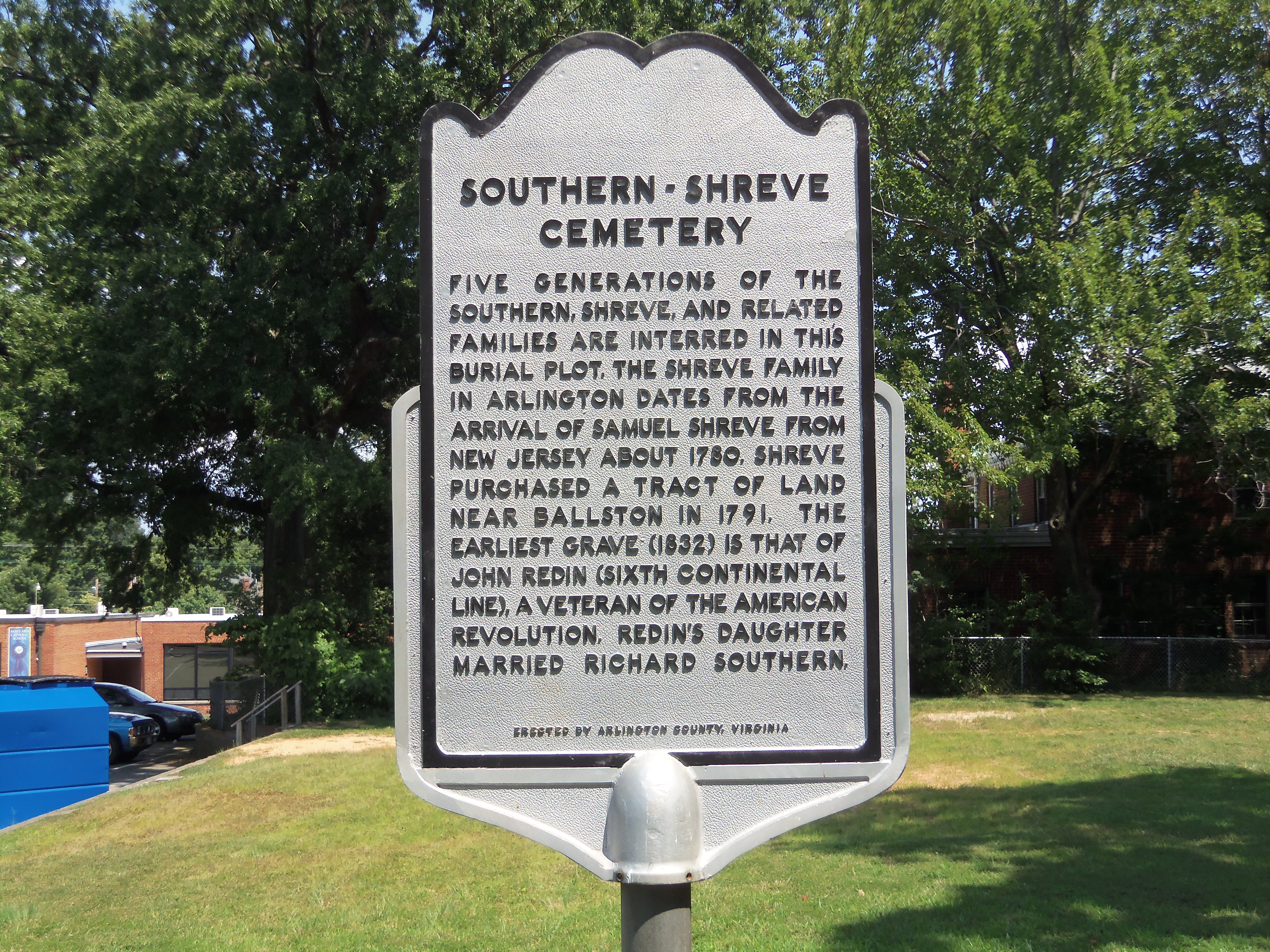
Southern-Shreve Cemetery

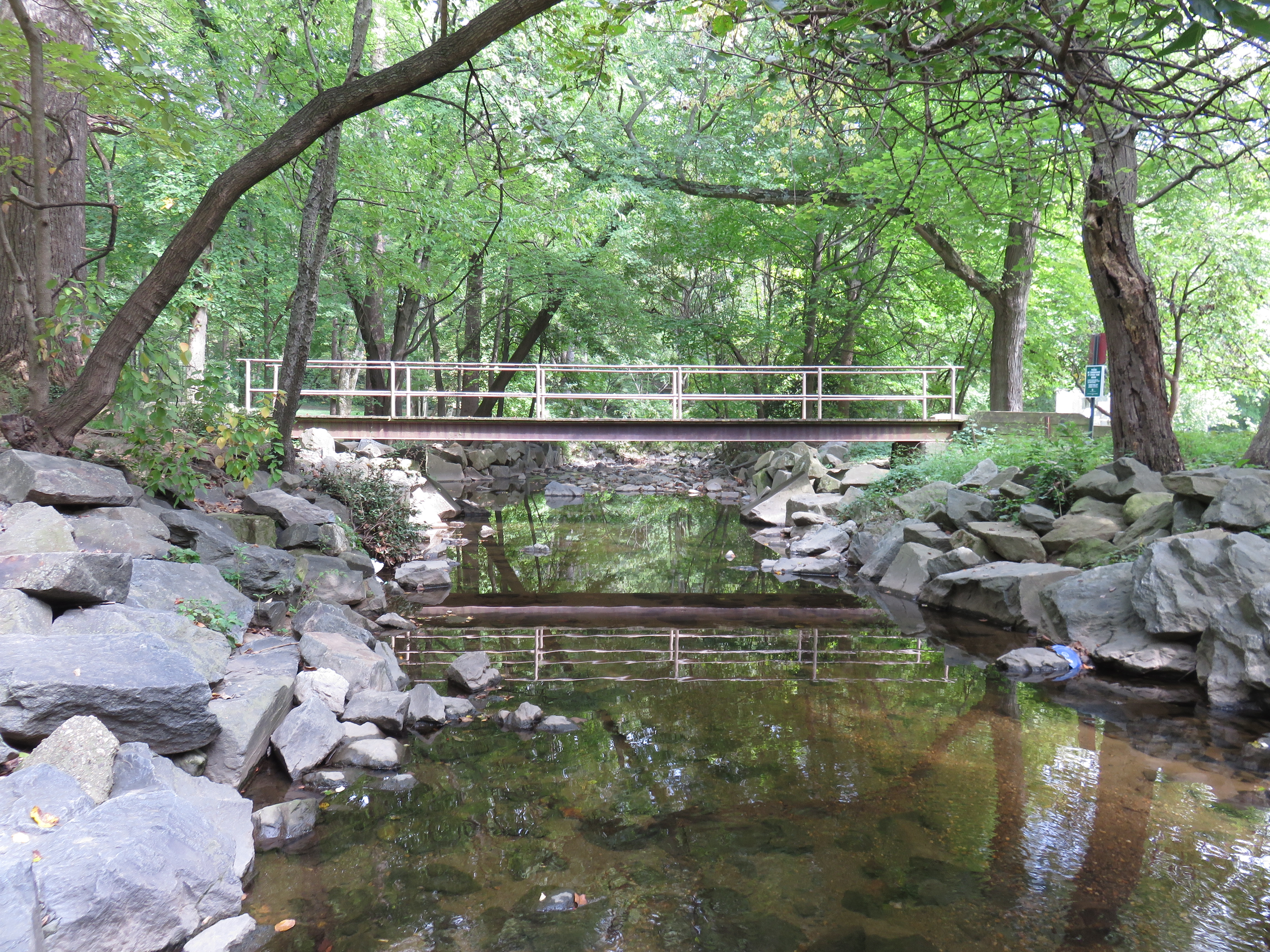
Bon Air Park

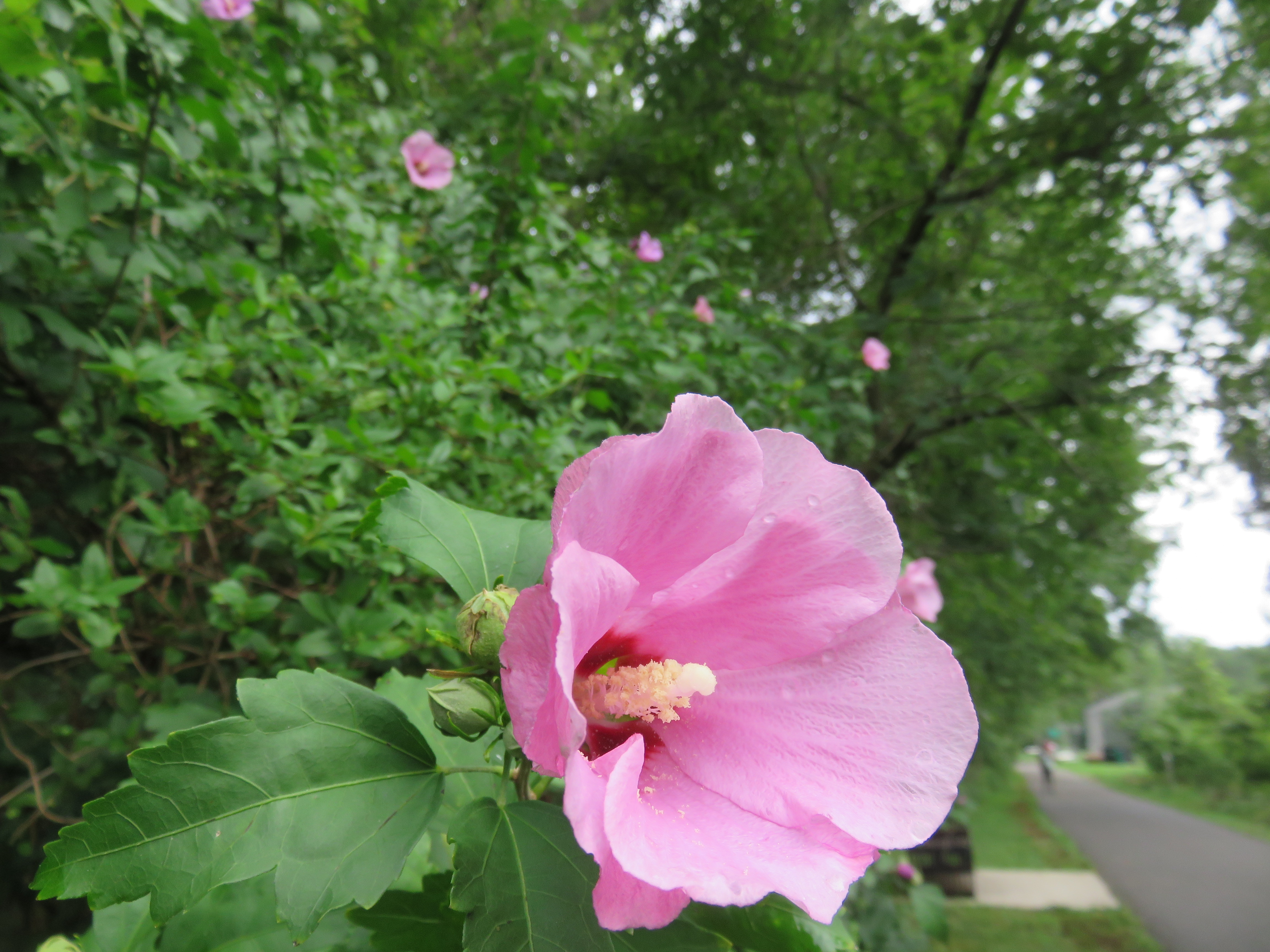
Bluemont Park

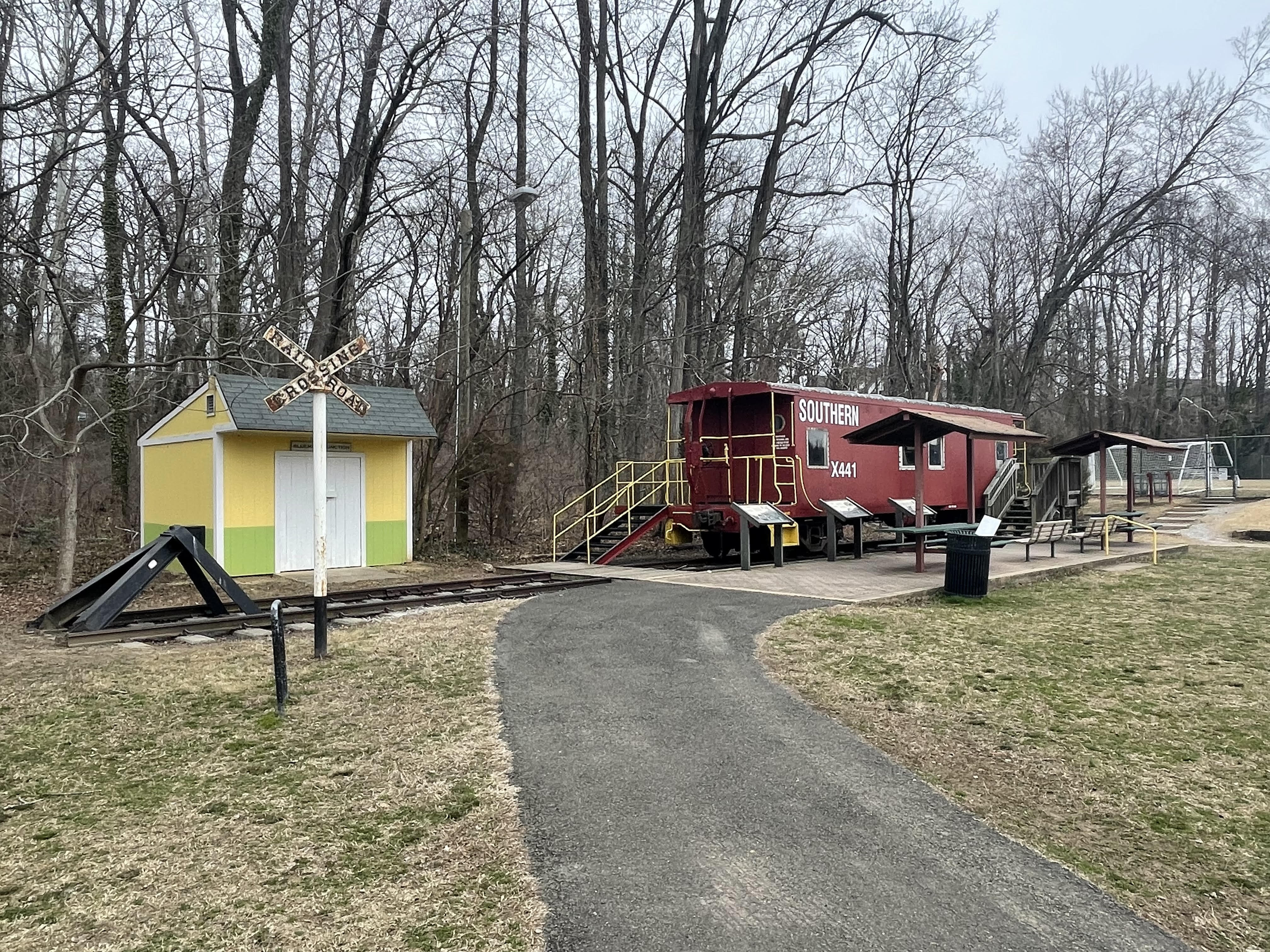
Bluemont Junction Park

== See also ==
- List of neighborhoods in Arlington County, Virginia
- Reevesland
