= Fair Oaks Mall =

Coordinates: 38.863°N 77.359°W

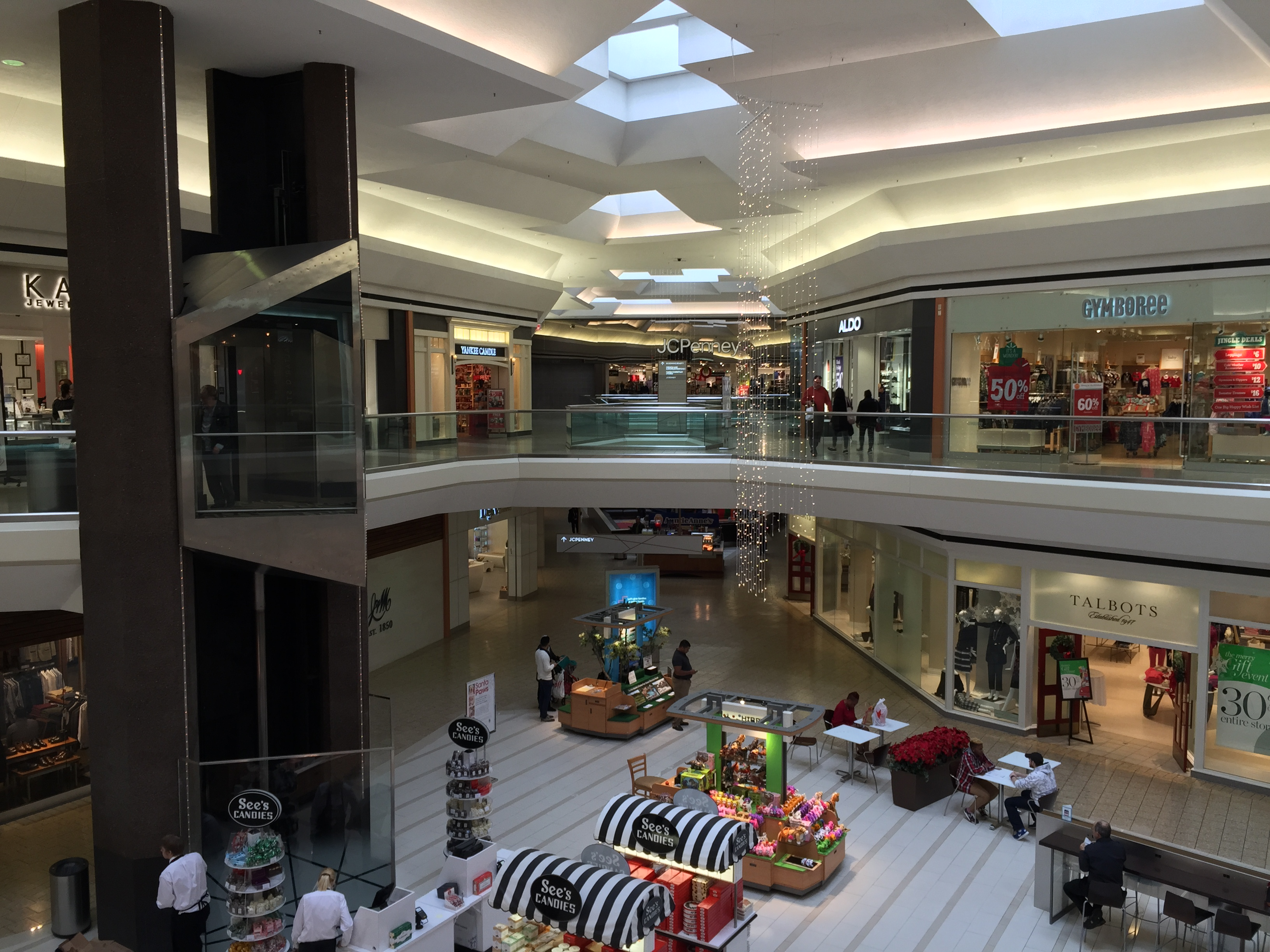
- Fair Oaks Mall in November 2016
- Location: Fair Oaks, Fairfax County, Virginia
- Address: 11750 Fair Oaks Mall, Fairfax, Virginia 22033
- Opened: July 31, 1980; 46 years ago
- Developer: A. Alfred Taubman
- Manager: Olshan Properties
- Owner: Olshan Properties
- Num. of stores: 170+
- Num. of anchor tenants: 5 (2 coming soon)
- Floor area: 1,557,000 sq ft (144,700 m^{2})
- Floors: 2 (3 in Macy's)
- Public transit: Fairfax Connector: 605, 630, 651; Metrobus: F60, F61
- Website: http://www.shopfairoaksmall.com

Fair Oaks Mall is a shopping mall in the Fair Oaks census-designated place (CDP) of unincorporated Fairfax County, Virginia, just northwest of the independent city of Fairfax. It is located at the intersection of Interstate 66 and U.S. Route 50. The mall has a gross leasable area (GLA) of 1,557,000 sq ft (144,700 m^{2}). The mall features two Macy's stores alongside other anchors such as JCPenney, Dick's Sporting Goods, and Dave & Buster's. Two anchors are under development: a grocery store called Fresh World and a Sky Zone trampoline park. The mall also features prominent specialty retailers such as Pottery Barn, Windsor, Sephora, and Williams Sonoma.

== History ==
Fair Oaks Mall officially opened on July 31, 1980. The 1,400,000-square-foot (130,000 m^{2}) mall, developed by Taubman Centers, opened in the midst of a recession, with only four of six anchor stores in operation (Hecht's, JCPenney, Sears, and Woodward & Lothrop) and 15 other storefronts occupied, leaving three fourths of the storefronts empty. The two remaining anchors opened shortly after: in-line junior anchor Garfinckel's on August 21, 1980, and Lord & Taylor in spring 1981. Developers expected 60 to be occupied by the Christmas season and 100 by the following year. Upon opening, it was the largest mall in the Washington, D.C., area. It included the first suburban Washington location of the British homegoods store Conran's.

In 1982, the Fair Oaks Mall was one of the first sites used by Sears as part of its effort to offer financial services to customers, including stocks, bonds, insurance and real estate, from its Dean Witter, Allstate and Coldwell Banker subsidiaries.

In 1987, the mall's owners attempted to evict Garfinckel's and a related company, Raleigh Stores Holding, Inc., claiming that the store owners had not received the landlord's permission to assign the lease after Allied Stores divested some lines of business. The Garfinckel's chain went out of business in 1990, and Woodward & Lothrop used the space as an auxiliary store for home furnishings. After Woodward & Lothrop went out of business, their furniture store became a Mastercraft furniture store, and then Forever 21 in 2008. In 1998, Lord & Taylor moved from its original location to the old Woodward & Lothrop store. The old Lord & Taylor was converted to the mall's first Macy's.

In 1988, seeking to reach out to a broader range of patrons, the Fairfax library system opened a 10,000-volume branch at the Fair Oaks Mall. The mall also contains a Virginia DMV customer service center.

From 2013 through 2014, Fair Oaks Mall underwent a renovation of common areas. The five entrances to the mall were completely renovated, and a grand entrance was built on the north side of the mall along Route 50. The interior was updated with new floor tile, seating areas, technology tables, lighting, furniture, and the Michael & Son Fun Zone for children (since renamed).

After Sears closed, the space was subdivided into many different retailers and restaurants. The sit-down dining offerings in the mall include restaurant and entertainment facility Dave & Buster's, Cheesecake Factory, Brio Tuscan Grille, Texas de Brazil, Breakers Korean BBQ & Grill, Sushi On, and Lazy Dog Restaurant & Bar. Dick’s Sporting Goods also built their store and opened in the former Sears anchor space.

In March 2021, it was announced that in anticipation for the proposed Orange Line extension as well as the planned transit hub in the vicinity, that Taubman, the mall development firm, has won amendment approval to allow them to construct an open air addition at the center which includes 2000 housing units, offices, and hotel uses, totaling up to 4.8 million square feet. Plans also call for a central plaza and other urban parks throughout the development which will allow for gathering spaces and a space for public events.

By 2023, Fair Oaks Mall had also announced several newest additions, among them are Ardene, Lovisa, Showcase, Miniso, as well as an upcoming location for Movement, an indoor climbing gymnasium which is also set to feature fitness and a yoga studio.

On April 11, 2024, Olshan Properties took ownership of the mall from Taubman, securing long-term loan extension.

On November 7, 2024, Apple closed its location at the Fair Oaks Mall and was relocated to the Fairfax Corner shopping center across Interstate 66 on November 9.

In September 2025, grocery store Fresh World began plans to purchase the former Lord & Taylor anchor space. They plan on opening a 80,000-square-foot supermarket where Lord & Taylor was located.

In January 2026, Sky Zone announced plans to open a trampoline park in the remainder of the available former Sears anchor space. The chain has been expanding across the country due to the success of their trampoline parks.

== See also ==
- Tyson's Corner
