= Arlington Boulevard =

Arterial road in Virginia

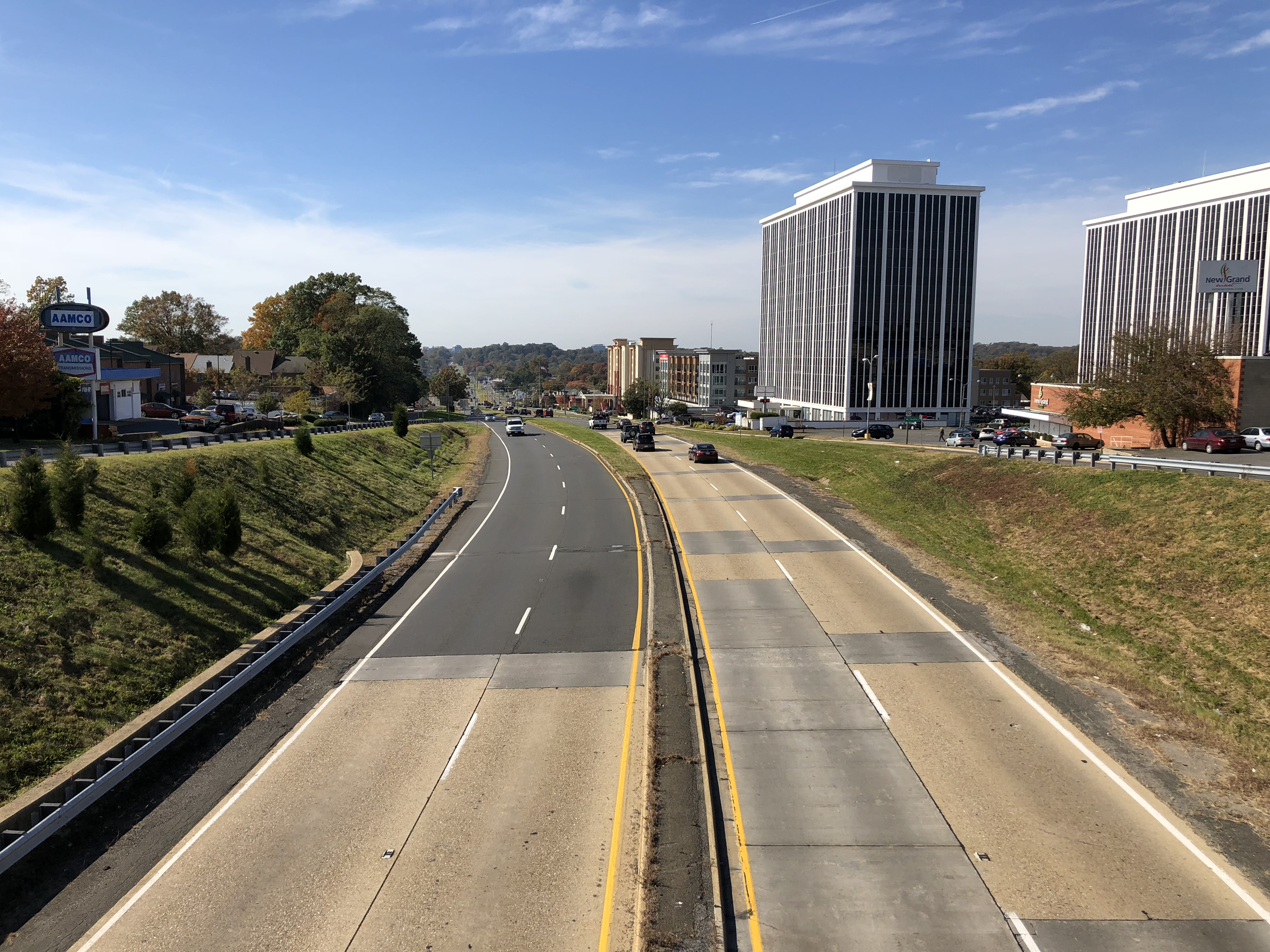
- Arlington Boulevard in West Falls Church, Virginia in October 2018
- Component highways: US 50
- From: Theodore Roosevelt Bridge
- To: Fairfax City

Construction
- Inauguration: 1938

Arlington Boulevard is a major arterial road in Arlington County, Fairfax County, and the independent City of Fairfax in Northern Virginia in metropolitan Washington, DC, United States. It is designated U.S. Route 50 (US 50) for its entire length and is part of the National Highway System.

Arlington Boulevard serves to bisect Arlington County into its northern and southern sections in popular parlance and for designation of street directional affixes according to the county's street-naming system.

== Route description ==
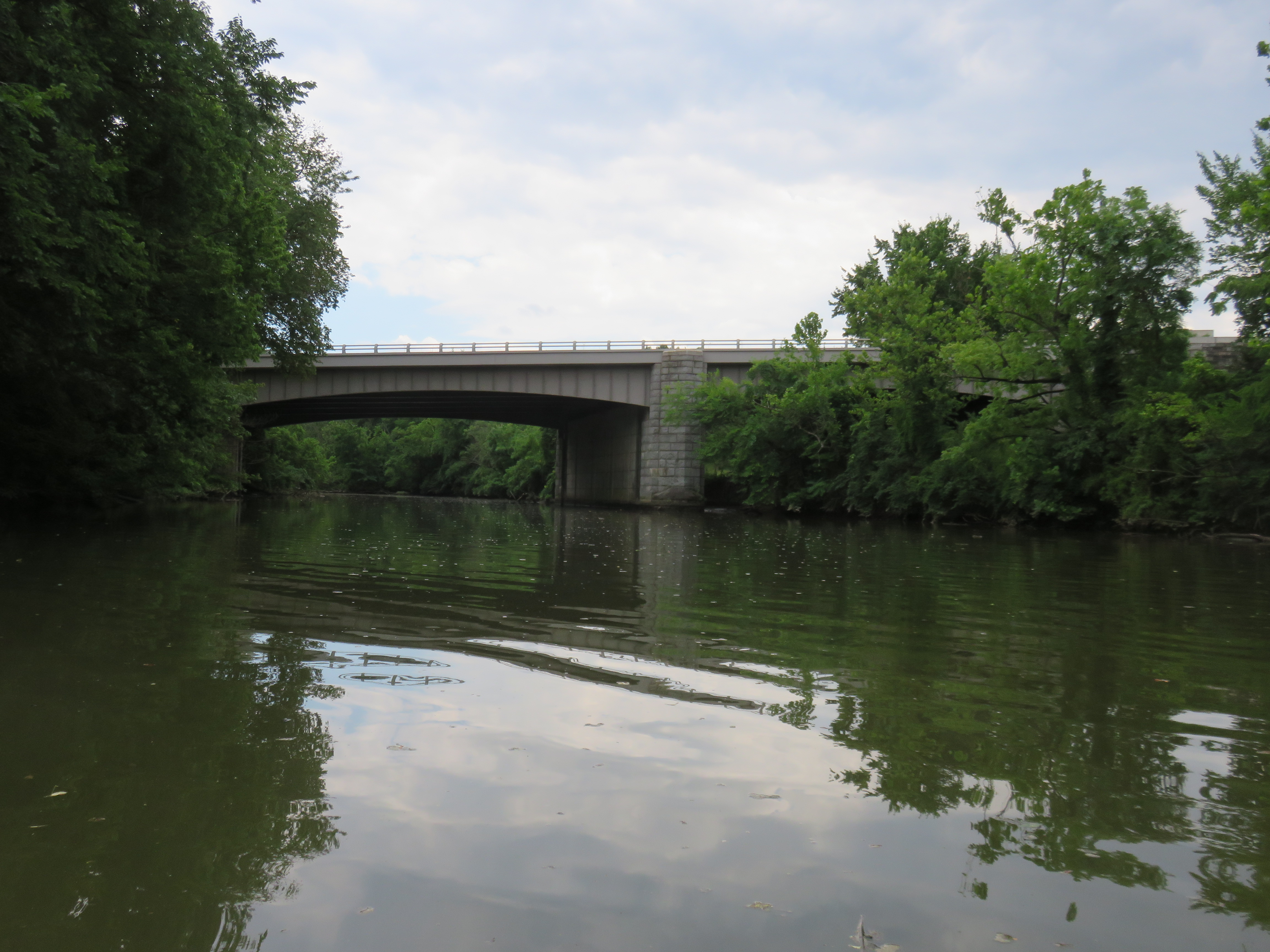
Crossing of Boundary Channel on the Virginia–Washington, D.C. border

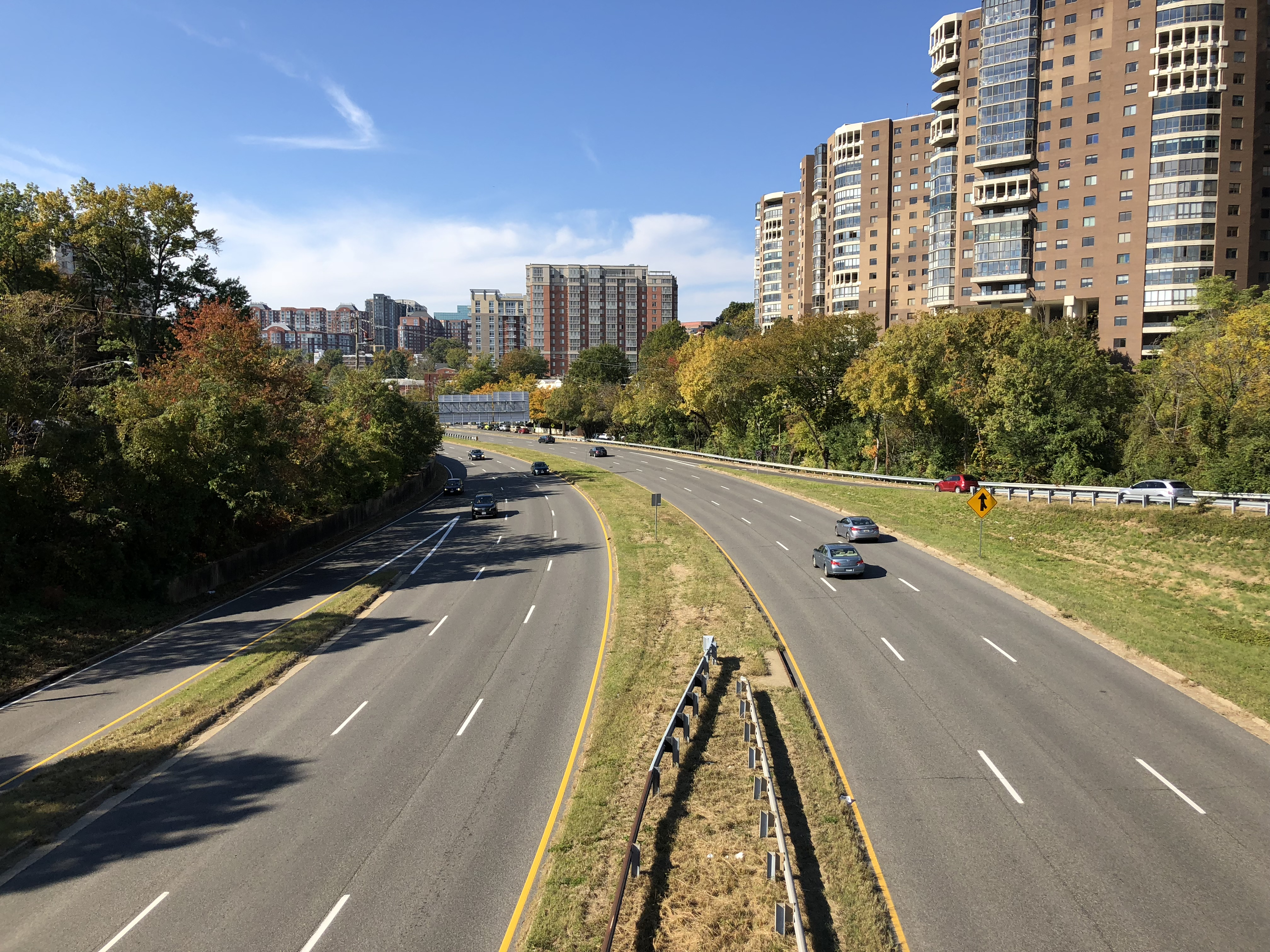
Arlington Boulevard westbound in Arlington County, just west of the Theodore Roosevelt Bridge

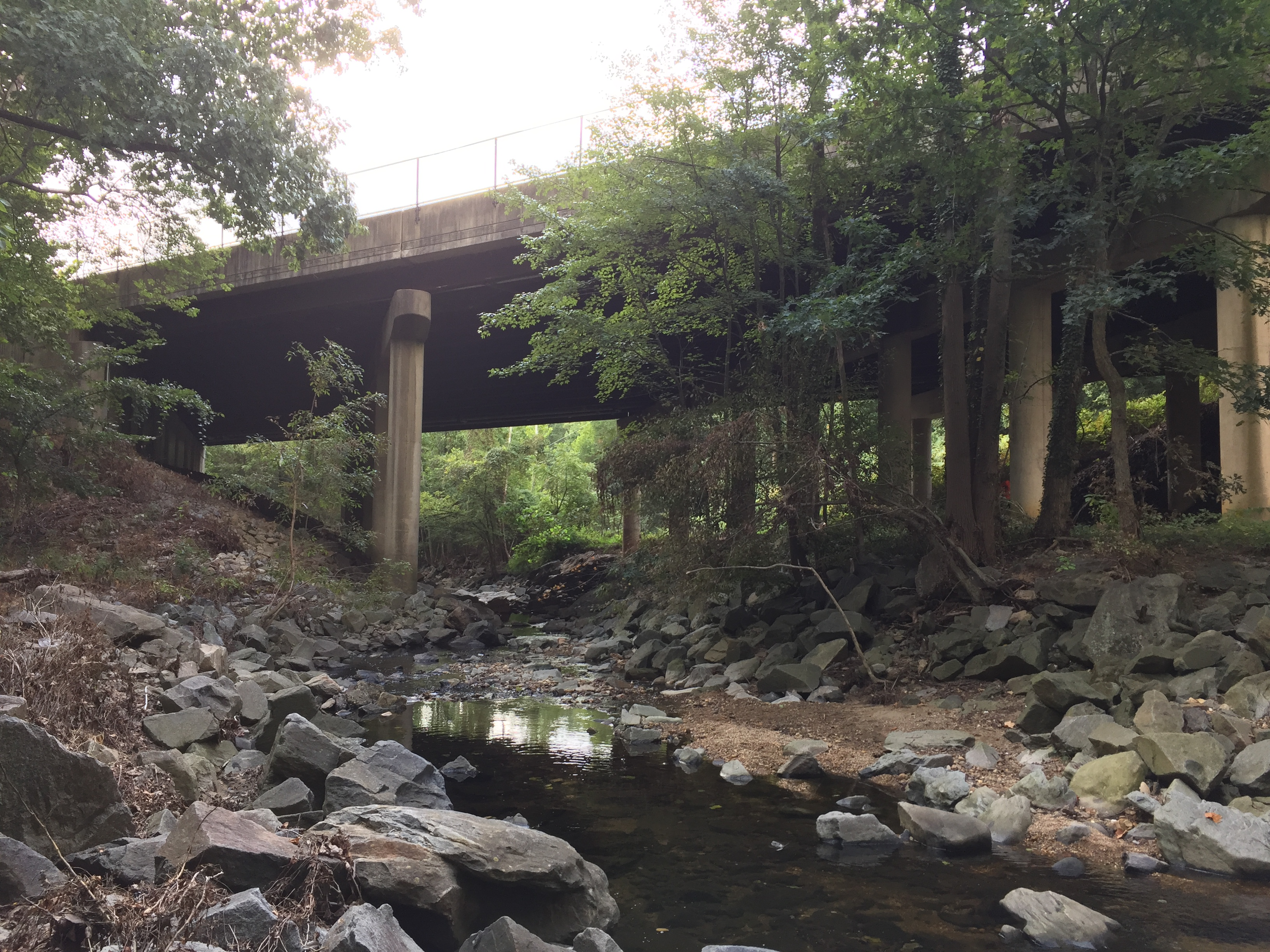
Arlington Boulevard crossing Four Mile Run

Arlington Boulevard begins in the east on Columbia Island in Washington, D.C., at the traffic circle between the Arlington Memorial Bridge and Memorial Drive. It carries northbound traffic across Boundary Channel into Virginia, where it has a partial interchange with Interstate 66 and the George Washington Memorial Parkway at the foot of the Theodore Roosevelt Bridge. At the interchange, Arlington Boulevard becomes a divided highway and assumes the U.S. Route 50 designation.

It proceeds westward soon turning south along the edge of Fort Myer, a U.S. Army post. Most of the junctions in this section are grade-separated interchanges. At an interchange with Washington Boulevard (VA 27), the road turns west again and continues in that direction for the remainder of its length.

Arlington Boulevard has interchanges with VA 120 (Glebe Road) in Arlington County and VA 7 (Leesburg Pike)/VA 338 (Hillwood Avenue)/SR 613 (Wilson Boulevard) at Seven Corners and I-495 (Capital Beltway) in Fairfax County.

It terminates just inside Fairfax City at a traffic circle with US 29 (Lee Highway and Fairfax Boulevard) and Old Lee Highway. VA 237, which arrives at the circle as Lee Highway concurrent with US 29, also concurs with US 50 on Arlington Boulevard for less than 1/3 mile before turning south onto Pickett Road.

== History ==
Arlington Boulevard has a shorter history than many other major arterial roads in the region and was only built in the first half of the 20th century in several stages beginning in the west and progressing east. The entire route was complete in 1938 with the final section around Fort Myer. The road was originally called Lee Boulevard but, with Lee Highway being another major route in Northern Virginia, the name was changed to Arlington Boulevard in the early 1950s.

Between 1935 and 1937, the US 50 designation was attached to the road even though it had yet to be completed past Glebe Road, then VA 9. Before that, the road was VA 236, a number now assigned to the nearby Little River Turnpike.

The completed Arlington Boulevard's eastern terminus was originally the crossing of the George Washington Memorial Parkway on Columbia Island in the District of Columbia. With the completion of the Theodore Roosevelt Bridge in 1964, Arlington Boulevard's terminus was moved to its present location.

In 1973, state and county officials announced plans to add two bus lanes (now known as the service lanes) to the four car lanes on the section between Seven Corners and Pershing Drive (except for about half a mile west of Four Mile Run). Work on that project completed in November 1974. In 1978 the service lanes, which had been for buses and right turning cars only during rush hour, were opened up to car pool vehicles with 4 or more passengers. In 1984, as traffic moved over to I-66 and bus routes were re-configured to feed into Metrorail, the rush hour restrictions were removed from the service lanes altogether. This was done over the objections of the Arlington County Board, but with the endorsement of the Fairfax County Board and the Arlington County Manager.

In the 1980s, the section of Arlington Boulevard without service lanes between Glen Carlin Road (now Manchester Road) and Four Mile Run was widened from four lanes to six lanes.

== Arlington Boulevard Trail ==
The Arlington Boulevard Trail is a set of discontinuous trails and on-road bike routes, 11 miles in length, on both sides of Arlington Boulevard. The trail runs from N. Rhodes Street in Arlington County to Fairview Park Drive in Falls Church. It has been proposed that the trail be extended to Pickets Road in Fairfax Virginia.

The trail opened on November 18, 1974, in conjunction with preferential bus lanes, as a 1.7 mile long, paved trail between the Four Mile Run Trail and North Pershing Drive in Arlington. It was Arlington's 2nd Trail. By 1976, the trail had been extended west with another 2.3 miles. In May 1979, the trail was extended east from its endpoint at North Pershing, around Fort Myer to Arlington Memorial Bridge. In 2014, a new segment was built from N. Pershing to Rolfe street on the east side of Arlington Boulevard, and the old section over the same stretch was widened and extended under 10th Street, closing a gap in the trail. In 2017, the short section from Wainwright Road to Washington Boulevard was repaved as part of a Washington Gas Pipeline Replacement Project. In January 2020 the Gables apartment community, which had been under construction since 2017, opened and one of the street space improvements included was a widening of the ~500 feet of trail between Rolfe and Rhodes street from 5 feet to 10 feet with 5 feet of green space.

== See also ==
- U.S. Route 50 in Virginia
- Streets and highways of Arlington County, Virginia
