= Streets and highways of Arlington County, Virginia =

This article deals with the streets and highways of Arlington County, Virginia, a suburb of Washington, D.C. in the United States.

== Overview ==
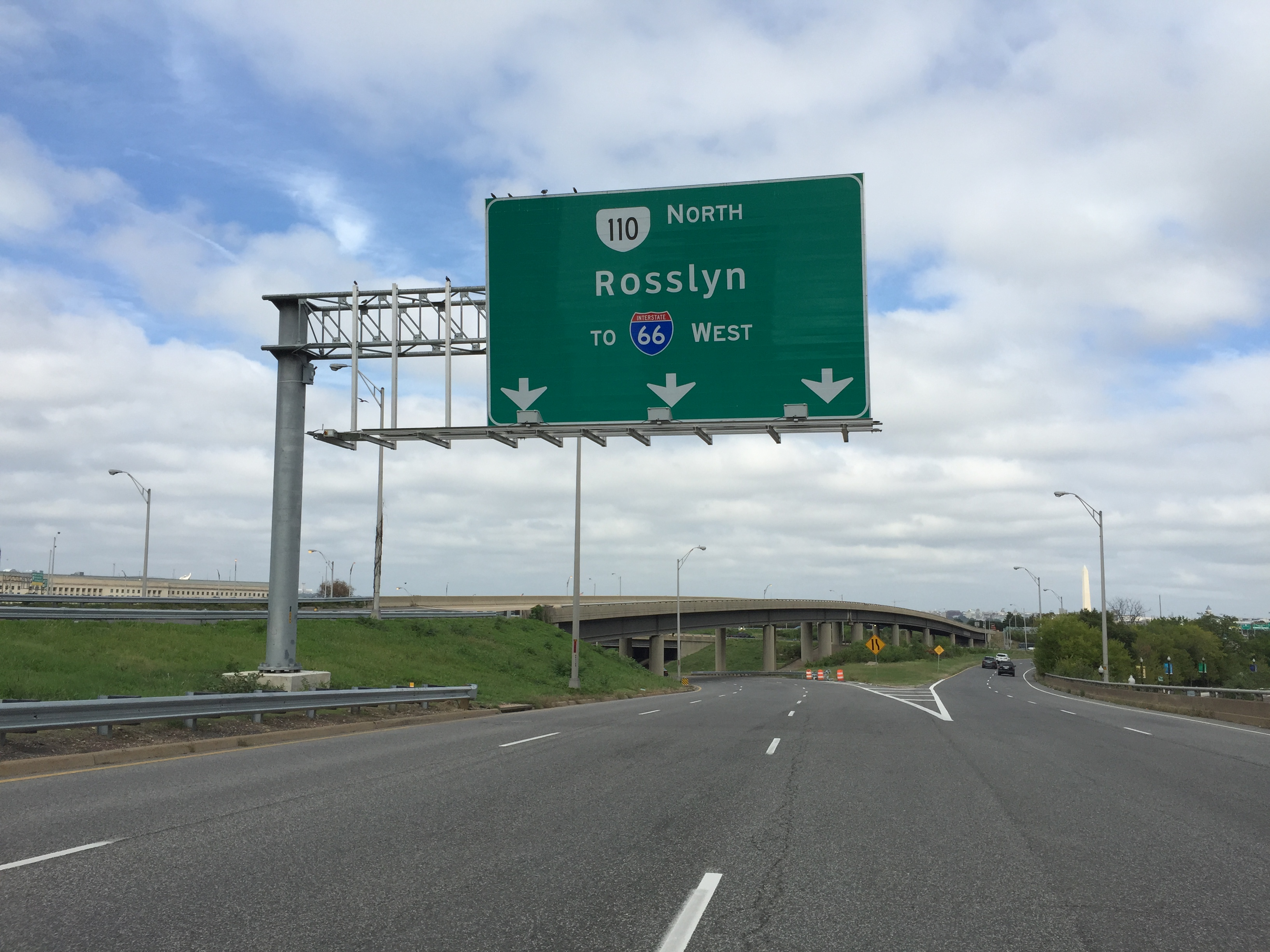
Highway sign along U.S. Route 1 to Rosslyn

In 2009, the county maintains 376 miles (605 km) of roads. As of 2004, the total mileage of (primary) state highways in Arlington County was 39.66 (59 km).

Arlington County is one of only two counties in Virginia which maintain its own roads (with the exception of primary state highways, including U.S. Highways and Interstates), the other being Henrico County outside the state capital of Richmond. Because of this special status, there are no secondary state roads and, therefore, most roads are unnumbered. This status originated due to the existence of county highway departments in Arlington prior to the creation of the state transportation agency which is now the VDOT in 1927, and the assumption of local roads control by that agency in 1932. The control of the roads system is considered a powerful advantage for community urban planners, who can require developers to contribute to funding needed for road needs serving their projects.

Although the streets of Arlington County are not laid out on a grid plan, its local streets follow the Arlington County, Virginia, street-naming system: a system of sequential numbered or alphabetic patterns that are both rational and provide address numbering information.

== Interstate highways ==
=== Interstate 66 ===
Interstate 66
- Location: Middletown, VA - Washington, DC
- Length: 76.38 mi (122.92 km)
- History: Planned to have one auxiliary loop route, but the loop is cancelled in 1972. I-66 currently does not have any auxiliary routes.

The configuration of Interstate 66 through Arlington (first proposed in 1956) has long been controversial. The Arlington Coalition on Transportation (ACT) filed a lawsuit in Federal District Court in 1971 opposing the portion of the project through Arlington. The group objected to that urban segment due to concerns over air quality, noise and community cohesion changes. In 1972 the U.S. Fourth Circuit Court of Appeals ruled in favor of ACT, technically blocking any construction. Arlington Coalition on Transportation v. Volpe, 458 F.2d 1323 (4th Cir.), cert. denied, 409 U.S. 1000 (1972). The impasse was eventually broken when the parties agreed on experts to conduct air quality and noise studies for the Virginia Department of Transportation, then known as the Virginia Department of Highways; then, Secretary of Transportation Coleman personally intervened in 1976 with negotiations to reach a compromise by reducing the highway capacity, making I-66 HOV during parts of the day, and including a subway route in I-66's median.

The eastbound traffic lanes of I-66 in Arlington are presently restricted to high-occupancy vehicle (HOV) traffic and motorcycles during morning peak hours, while the westbound lanes are restricted to this traffic during the evening peak hours. Due to very frequent traffics jams in the four lane section of I-66, many people in the region have advocated widening I-66, although the County Board and many local residents continue to oppose it.

=== Interstate 395 ===
Interstate 395
- Location: Springfield, VA - Washington, DC
- Length: 13.31 mi (21.42 km)

Begun during World War II to serve the Pentagon, Interstate 395 (I-395) (named the Henry G. Shirley Memorial Highway) bisects Arlington as it travels southwest/northeast between the 14th Street Bridge and Alexandria.

Until it closed in 1968, the Washington and Old Dominion Railroad's freight trains regularly backed up rush hour traffic and collided with automobiles and trucks as they crossed the highway at grade on tracks guarded by flashing signal lights and ringing bells, but no crossing gates. At the time, this was the only at-grade intersection of a railroad and a limited-access federal highway.

Heavily congested during peak hours, the freeway now contains two central lanes that operate as high-occupancy vehicle (HOV) lanes during rush hours while separated by Jersey barriers from the road's regular traffic lanes. Although express Metrobuses often travel in the HOV lanes, Metrorail does not travel along its corridor.

=== Proposed interstates ===
==== Interstate 595 ====
Interstate 595
- Location: Ronald Reagan National Airport

Interstate 595 was a proposed upgrade to U.S. 1 (Jefferson Davis Highway) in Crystal City.

==== Interstate 266 ====
Interstate 266
- Location: Arlington VA - Washington
- Length: 1.79 mi (2.88 km)
- History: Cancelled in 1972 on the face of Washington's Freeway Revolts.

Interstate 266 was a proposed loop route from Interstate 66 between Arlington and Washington, D.C., that would have crossed the Potomac River on a new bridge.

== Arterial routes ==
The street-naming system does not apply to the main arteries (none of which are called "streets"). The north-south arteries from east to west include US 1 (also known as Richmond Hwy, previously Jefferson Davis Highway), Walter Reed Drive, Glebe Road, George Mason Drive and Carlin Springs Road. The east-west arteries from north to south include Williamsburg Boulevard, Yorktown Boulevard, Lee Highway (U.S. Route 29), Wilson Boulevard, U.S. Route 50 (Arlington Boulevard), State Route 244 (Columbia Pike) and Four Mile Run Drive.

Another main artery, Washington Boulevard, previously a cow path, runs both east-west and north-south. Through most of Arlington it runs east-west between Wilson Boulevard and Lee Highway. When it reaches the east side of the county, it turns south to avoid Fort Myer, crosses US 50 and becomes State Route 27, a freeway, before crossing SR 244 and intersecting with I-395. It then turns back northeast and runs past the Pentagon to end at the D.C. boundary just before the George Washington Memorial Parkway.

== Parkways ==
Arlington has two limited-access scenic parkways maintained by the U.S. National Park Service which also serve as major commuter routes.

=== George Washington Memorial Parkway ===
The George Washington Memorial Parkway runs northwest-southeast along Arlington County's entire Potomac River boundary with Washington, D.C., except for a small section traversing Columbia Island which is part of the District of Columbia.

=== Spout Run Parkway ===
The Spout Run Parkway is a spur from the George Washington Parkway providing access to Cherrydale, Lee Highway (U.S. Highway 29), and, indirectly, Interstate 66.

== Bridges ==
Arlington County is connected to Washington, D.C. by several road bridges across the Potomac River. From upstream to the southeast, they are the Chain Bridge (State Route 123), the Francis Scott Key Bridge (U.S. Route 29), the Theodore Roosevelt Bridge (Interstate 66/U.S. Route 50), the Arlington Memorial Bridge, and the 14th Street Bridge complex (Interstate 395/U.S. Route 1).

== See also ==
- Arlington County, Virginia, street-naming system
- Streets and highways of Washington, D.C.
