= Metroway =

Bus rapid transit line in Virginia

A1X
- Pentagon City–Potomac Yard Line

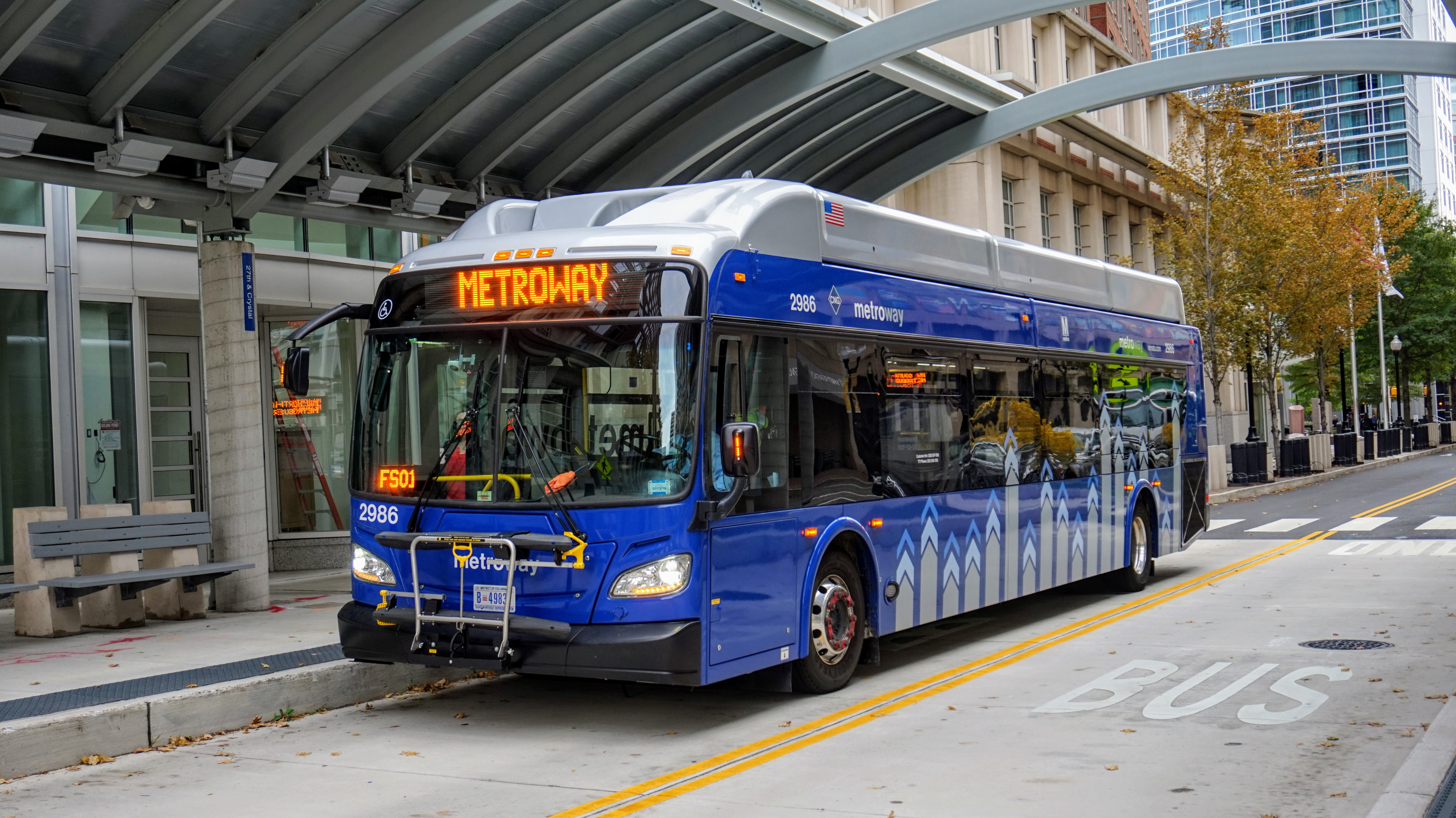
- A New Flyer XN40 bus at 27th & Crystal station

Overview
- System: Metrobus
- Operator: Washington Metropolitan Area Transit Authority
- Garage: Four Mile Run
- Livery: Local
- Status: Active
- Began service: August 24, 2014
- Ended service: Metroway: June 28, 2025
- Predecessors: 9S, Metroway

Routes
- Routes: 1
- Locale: City of Alexandria, Arlington County
- Start: Pentagon City station
- End: Braddock Road station
- Length: 6.8 mi (11 km)
- Stations: 17

Service
- Level: Daily
- Frequency: 12-20 minutes
- Weekend frequency: 20 minutes
- Journey time: 25 minutes
- Operates: 5:30 AM – 10:00 PM (weekdays); 6:30 AM - 10:30 PM (Saturdays); 7:30 AM - 10:00 PM (Sundays)
- Daily ridership: 1,424 (April 2026)
- Ridership: 376,642 (FY 2025)
- Timetable: Metroway timetable
- Map: Metroway map
Route map
Metroway highlighted in blue
Key

The Pentagon City–Potomac Yard Line, designated Route A1X (previously known as Metroway until 2025), is a bus rapid transit (BRT) line operated by the Washington Metropolitan Area Transit Authority (WMATA) as part of its Metrobus system. The A1X operates in Arlington and Alexandria, Virginia. It opened on August 24, 2014, and was the first bus rapid transit line to open in Virginia and in the Washington metropolitan area. On June 29, 2025, Metroway was renamed as route A1X during WMATA's Better Bus Redesign.

== Route ==
The service runs from its northern end at the Pentagon City south through Crystal City and Potomac Yard before ending at the Braddock Road Metrorail station. The service runs along a bus-only roadway along Richmond Highway (U.S. Route 1) in Alexandria between Potomac and East Glebe stations, as well as a busway in Arlington. The remainder of the service runs on mixed-traffic roadways.

== Connections ==
As a WMATA Metrobus service, the A1X is integrated within the regional transit network, and is subject to the same fares and transfer rules as any other local Metrobus service. The Braddock Road, Potomac Yard, Crystal City, and Pentagon City stations offer service for the Metrorail Yellow and Blue lines. As it parallels the Yellow and Blue lines between Pentagon City and Braddock Road, it can be used as an alternative to Metrorail during service outages on Metrorail.

The Crystal City VRE station is a short distance (0.1 mile; 160 meters) away from the 18th & Crystal station.

The A1X provides connections to the Mount Vernon Trail at the 18th & Crystal station, and the Four Mile Run Trail at the South Glebe station. Capital Bikeshare stations exist at or near several A1X stations.

== Expansions ==
Metroway has been expanded since its opening in 2014, both in number of stations and length of route. Two new stations opened in Arlington, both in April 2016. Fayette station in Alexandria opened in 2017.

On April 17, 2016, the 33rd & Crystal and Pentagon City stations opened, bringing the total number of operating stations to 15. At the same time, a dedicated transit lane and a peak period transit lane opened in Arlington. While the Fayette and 33rd & Crystal stations are infill stations along the existing route, the addition of the Pentagon City station extended the route north, which changed the northern terminus from Crystal City to Pentagon City. The 33rd & Crystal stop offers two-way service, while Pentagon City, the new northern terminus, is southbound-only.

The National Capital Region Transportation Planning Board wants to extend the dedicated transitway in Crystal City North to the Pentagon City Metro station.

Beginning May 25, 2019, as a result of the Blue and Yellow Lines being shut down south of National Airport for the summer, new stops were added on Potomac Avenue at East Glebe Road near the Kaiser Permanente and the National Institute for the Blind (NIB) Headquarters.

As part of the Amazon HQ2 project, plans were made in 2019 to extend the dedicated transitway to the section between Crystal City and Pentagon City, and add new stops at 12th & Clark Street, 12th & Elm Street, 12th & Hayes Street, and Army-Navy Drive. Construction began in April 2022, with completion expected in April 2023.

== Changes ==
As part of WMATA's Better Bus Redesign beginning on June 29, 2025, the Metroway was renamed into the A1X, discontinuing the Metroway branding. The route remained the same from the former Metroway counterpart.

== Stations ==
There are 17 stations on the route. Twelve of the stations offer two-way service; three of the stations—18th & Crystal, 23rd & Crystal, and Fayette—are northbound-only; and two other stations—26th & Clark and 23rd & Clark—are southbound-only.

Stations vary depending on location and jurisdiction, though all stations consist of side platforms and sidewalk-level bus stops.

Station	Direction	Station type	Connections
Arlington County, Virginia			
Pentagon City Bus Bay C	Southbound station, Northbound terminal	Curbside	Washington Metro: Arlington Transit: 42, 74, 84, 87; Fairfax Connector: 598; Metrobus: A11, A27, A40, A66, F44
Crystal City Bus Bay C (North) Bus Bay D (South)	Bidirectional	Curbside	Washington Metro: Virginia Railway Express (at Crystal City VRE); Arlington Transit: 43; Fairfax Connector: 598; Metrobus: A11, A40; PRTC OmniRide: 972
18th & Crystal	Northbound	Curbside	Virginia Railway Express (at Crystal City VRE); Metrobus: A40; Arlington Transit: 43
23rd & Crystal	Northbound	Curbside	PRTC OmniRide: 282, 482, 682, 882; Fairfax Connector: 598
23rd & Clark	Southbound	Curbside	PRTC OmniRide: 282, 482, 682, 882; Fairfax Connector: 598
26th & Clark	Southbound	Curbside	
27th & Crystal	Bidirectional	Transitway	
33rd & Crystal	Bidirectional	Transitway	
South Glebe	Bidirectional	Transitway	
Four Mile Run			
Alexandria, Virginia			
Reed	Bidirectional	Curbside	DASH: 33, 34, 36A, 36B
Potomac Yard	Bidirectional	Curbside	Washington Metro: DASH: 33, 34, 36A, 36B; Metrobus: A70
East Glebe & Potomac	Bidirectional	Curbside	DASH: 33, 34, 36A, 36B; Metrobus: A70
East Glebe	Bidirectional	Transitway	DASH: 34
Swann	Bidirectional	Transitway	DASH: 34
Custis	Bidirectional	Transitway	DASH: 34
Potomac	Bidirectional	Transitway	DASH: 34
Fayette	Bidirectional	Curbside	
Braddock Road Bus Bay B	Northbound station, Southbound terminal	Busway	Washington Metro: DASH: 30, 31, 103, 104; Metrobus: A11, A12

== See also ==
- GRTC Pulse, a bus rapid transit system in Richmond, Virginia
- National Landing—a new cross-jurisdictional neighborhood that will house the Amazon HQ2 and Virginia Tech Innovation Center.
