= Huntington–Pentagon Line =

Bus route in the United States

A11
- Huntington–Pentagon Line

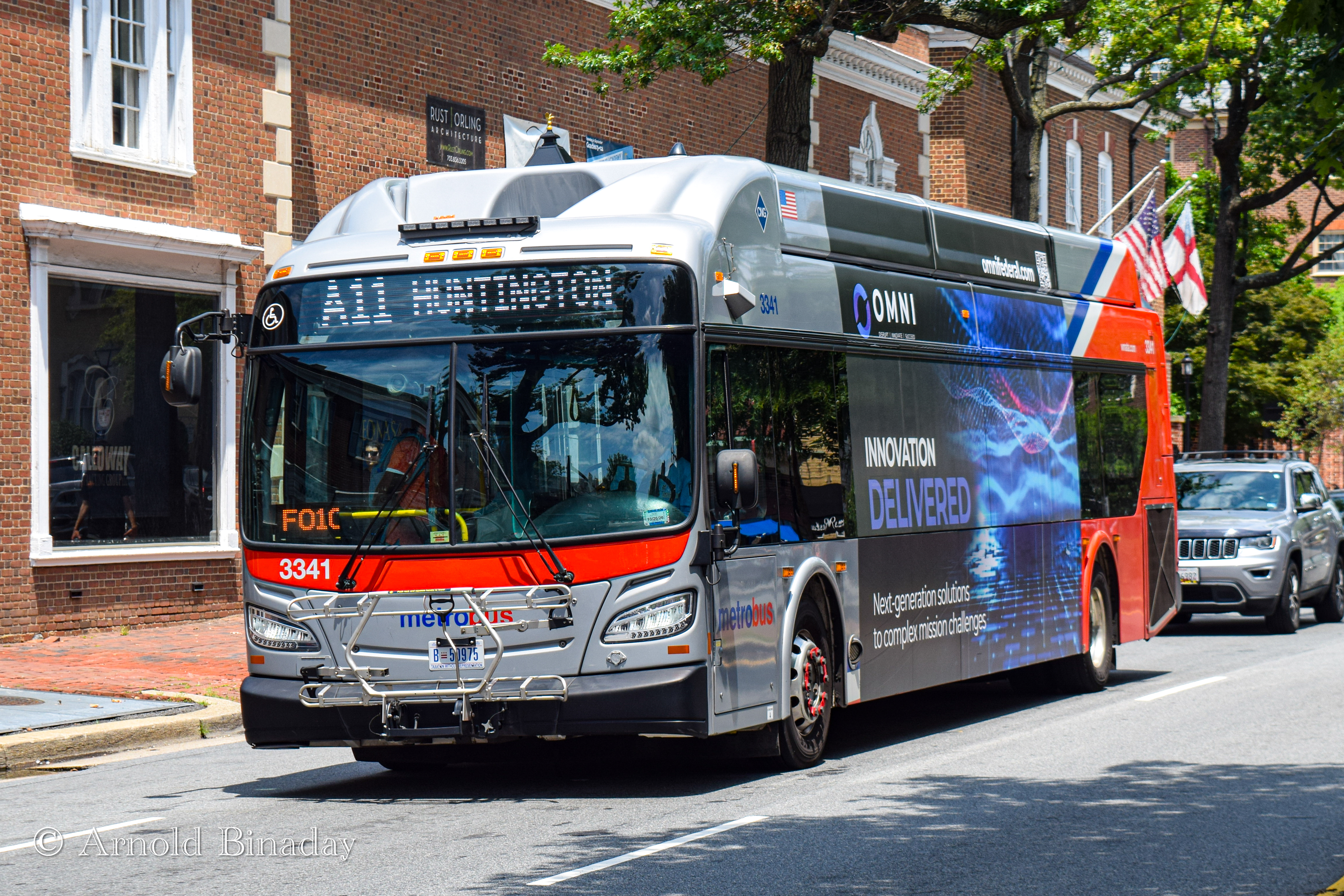
- Route A11 in Alexandria

Overview
- System: Metrobus
- Operator: Washington Metropolitan Area Transit Authority
- Garage: Four Mile Run
- Livery: Local
- Status: In Service
- Began service: 1960
- Ended service: 10S and 10T: March 11, 1984; 10R and 10S: June 26, 2016; 10E and 10N: September 5, 2021; 10A: June 28, 2025

Route
- Locale: Fairfax County; City of Alexandria; Arlington County
- Communities served: Huntington, Old Town Alexandria, Del Ray, Parkfairfax, Arlandria, Arlington Ridge, Aurora Highlands, Crystal City, Pentagon City
- Landmarks served: Huntington station, Braddock Road station, Crystal City station, Pentagon Row, Fashion Centre at Pentagon City, Pentagon City station, Pentagon station
- Start: Huntington station
- Via: 23rd Street, Mount Vernon Avenue, Washington Street, Huntington Avenue
- End: Pentagon station

Service
- Level: Daily
- Frequency: 30 minutes (Weekday and Saturday Service); 30-60 minutes (Evening service); 60 minutes (Sunday)
- Operates: 4:25 AM – 2:00 AM (Weekdays); 5:30 AM – 1:30 AM (Saturdays); 5:25 AM – 1:40 AM (Sundays)
- Ridership: 445,220 (FY 2025)
- Transfers: SmarTrip only
- Timetable: Huntington–Pentagon Line

The Huntington–Pentagon Line, designated as Route A11, is a daily bus route operated by the Washington Metropolitan Area Transit Authority between Huntington station of the Yellow Line of the Washington Metro and Pentagon station of the Yellow and Blue Lines of the Washington Metro. This line provides service within the neighborhoods in Fairfax County, Alexandria, and Arlington County. Alongside the neighborhoods, it also brings service through the marketplace, businesses, and offices within the counties.

== Route description and service ==
The A11 operates from Four Mile Run Division on various schedules. The A11 operates from Huntington station through Pentagon station via Mount Vernon Avenue, Washington Street and Pentagon Row.

== History ==
The Alexandria–Pentagon Line was introduced in 1960, under the Mount Vernon Avenue Line, as the route was part of the Alexandria, Barcroft and Washington Transit Company. It is the only route that the line is co-operated with the Washington Virginia & Maryland Coach Company. It was later operated by WMATA in 1973, when it acquired all routes from the AB&W and the WV&M. Since 1973, the Alexandria–Pentagon Line consists of all 10 line. The 10 line provides reliable service within Fairfax County, the City of Alexandria, and Arlington County to connect from neighborhoods, to marketplaces, to landmarks, and to business. Although, the Alexandria–Pentagon Line has various names and routes prior to the current name throughout the years.

=== First Incarnation of the Alexandria–Pentagon Line ===
The original Alexandria–Pentagon Line consists of 7 routes, as three lines was merged following the formation of WMATA and the creation of Metrobus. The original line consists of routes 12A, 12E, 14A, 14B, 15A, 15B and 15D, under the Alexandria–Washington Line. The 12A and 12E was originally the Braddock Heights Line, while the 14A and 14B was originally the Arlington Ridge Road Line, and 15A, 15B, and 15D was originally the Russell Road Line, all operated by the AB&W before the 7 routes was merged in 1973. The line was later renamed to the Alexandria–Pentagon Line in 1983, until all routes was discontinued on March 11, 1984. The 12A and 12E would later be brought back in service under the Centreville South Line, while the 14A and 14B would also be brought back to operate under the Montgomery–Tysons Beltway Express.

=== Alexandria–Arlington–Pentagon Line ===
The 10 line started its service as part of the Alexandria–Arlington–Pentagon Line. The 10 line consists of routes 10B, 10E, 10S, and 10T. The 10 line was also one of the new start of service through the City of Alexandria, following the introduction of route 10A, and the introduction of Alexandria Transit Company's DASH in March 1984, despite the elimination of the 10S and 10T. The line was later split through the late 1980s to early 1990s, when the entire 10 line was rerouted to serve to different stations of the Washington Metro system map.

=== Hunting Towers–Pentagon Line ===
Following the split of the 10 line, the 10A and 10E was renamed to the Hunting Towers–Pentagon Line from the late 1980s to early 1990s, while the 10B was split to form the Hunting Towers–Ballston Line. From the split, the 10A operated from Hunting Towers to Pentagon station, with select late night trips operating up to Old Town Alexandria near Braddock Road Station. The 10E once operated between the neighborhood of Del Ray in Alexandria and Pentagon station during directional peak hours.

=== Hunting Point–Pentagon Line ===
On September 30, 2012, the line is renamed to Hunting Point–Pentagon Line, as Hunting Point being the new name for the southern terminus of the 10A. Following the name change, the line started to expand its service, having the 10E extending to Rosslyn station. In 2014, the 10R and 10S was introduced on the line to bring in more service to the line. The 10R and 10S replaced the northern segment of the 10E, bringing the 10E route back where it originally was. The 10S was brought back in service as it was last used in 1984. Both the 10R and 10S operates during peak directional route, along with the 10E. The 10S is the only route which operates alongside Jefferson Davis Highway (now Richmond Highway) as the other routes continues to operate via Mount Vernon Avenue.

=== Second Incarnation of the Alexandria–Pentagon Line ===
On September 30, 2012, the line was renamed to Alexandria–Pentagon Line, following bus simplification of the line. The Alexandria–Pentagon Line was brought back in service for the first time since 1984, when it previously operated under various routes. Little service changes occurred with the line, with a new 10N route began on June 25, 2017, until its elimination in 2021, along with the 10E. The 10A operated until June 29, 2025, when the Better Bus Network went in effect, renaming the route to the A11 and renaming the line to the Huntington–Pentagon Line.

== Service Changes ==
On March 11, 1984, the 10S and 10T were discontinued and replaced by route 10A. Alternate service is available by the 10B, 10E, and Alexandria Transit Company's DASH routes.

On June 29, 2008, the 10E was extended from Del Ray to Braddock Road station. The 10E will continue to serve Del Ray via Mount Vernon Avenue along with the 10A.

On September 30, 2012, the 10E was extended to serve Rosslyn station. The 10E extension brings in service in Crystal City via Crystal City VRE station, however, it will not serve the Crystal City Metro station.

In 2013, WMATA proposed two options to the 10A and the 10E, following a major change planned for the route.

The first option was to truncate the 10E to Pentagon station, with the 10A being extended to Rosslyn station. The 10A would be renamed as the 10R, and will no longer operate via Pentagon station and will continue towards Rosslyn via Jefferson Davis Highway (now Richmond Highway).

The second option was similar to the first option, however, the 10A was proposed to extend its peak period trips to Downtown in Washington D.C. via Rosslyn station. The peak-hour 10A would be renamed as the 10Y and will operate on the same path as the first option, although with the extension, the 10Y will continue towards Interstate 66 to terminate at Farragut Square. There would be no changes for the off-peak and weekend 10A trips, retaining the same route number for these trips.

The reason why WMATA planned these changes, was to provide better connections from Hunting Point and downtown Alexandria to Rosslyn and Washington D.C., and to improve service time to Rosslyn to make the 10A reliable. It was also to reduce crowding to the Blue and Orange Lines of the Washington Metro during peak hours.

On March 30, 2014, the 10R and 10S were introduced, with the 10S replacing the 9E. The 10R and 10S also replaced the 10E Rosslyn extension. Both the 10R and 10S run during peak directional route, along with the 10E. Although, the 10S does not serve Crystal City, leading a non-stop service between Pentagon station and Rosslyn station.

On June 26, 2016, major changes occurred to the 10 line. The 10A was rerouted to serve between Old Town Alexandria and Huntington Station, replacing route 9A. The 10R and 10S were discontinued as the 10R was a redundancy of the 10E and the 10S was a redundancy of Metroway, by operating on the same path and times, despite that the 10S skips Crystal City. These changes result from the reincarnation of the Rosslyn extension to the 10E.

On June 25, 2017, route 10N was introduced to operate between Ronald Reagan Washington National Airport and Pentagon station via Crystal City and Pentagon City. The new 10N replaced the 13Y from the Arlington–Union Station Line, as it operates the same intervals as the 13Y, however, the 10N will only operate during Friday and Saturday late nights (after midnight) and early morning Sunday service between 6:30 AM and 7:30 AM only, and will not operate to Washington D.C. The 10N was also added as the Washington Metro service hours were changed.

On June 24, 2018, the 10E segment between Rosslyn and the Pentagon was eliminated, as it was a redundancy of the Blue Line. The 10E will continue to operate between Pentagon station and Hunting Point during peak hours.

On May 25, 2019, major changes were added to the 10A, as WMATA announced the summer shutdown on the Yellow and Blue lines of the Washington Metro, to rebuild station platforms on 6 stations south of Ronald Reagan Washington National Airport station. The 10A increased service on peak hours from 30 minutes and 15 minutes and will serve both sides of the Huntington station. These changes went into effect from Memorial Day until Labor Day, the time when the 6 Yellow/Blue line stations were rebuilt.

During the COVID-19 pandemic, all Route 10E service was suspended and Routes 10A and 10N began operating on its Saturday schedule beginning on March 16, 2020. However beginning on March 18, 2020, the route was further reduced to operate on its Sunday schedule. Also beginning on March 21, 2020, weekend service was suspended. On August 23, 2020, Route 10A weekend service was restored but the 10N was suspended entirely while the 10E remained suspended.

On September 10, 2020, as part of its FY2022 proposed budget, WMATA proposed to eliminate routes 10E and 10N service to reduce costs and low federal funds.

On September 5, 2021, all Route 10A service was restored to its pre-pandemic schedule. However, Routes 10E and 10N were never brought back to service.

Due to rising cases of the COVID-19 Omicron variant, the route was reduced to its Saturday service on weekdays. Full weekday service resumed on February 7, 2022.

As part of WMATA's Better Bus Redesign taking place on June 29, 2025, the 10A was renamed into the A11.
