= Crystal City station (Washington Metro) =

Washington Metro station in Virginia, US

Crystal City
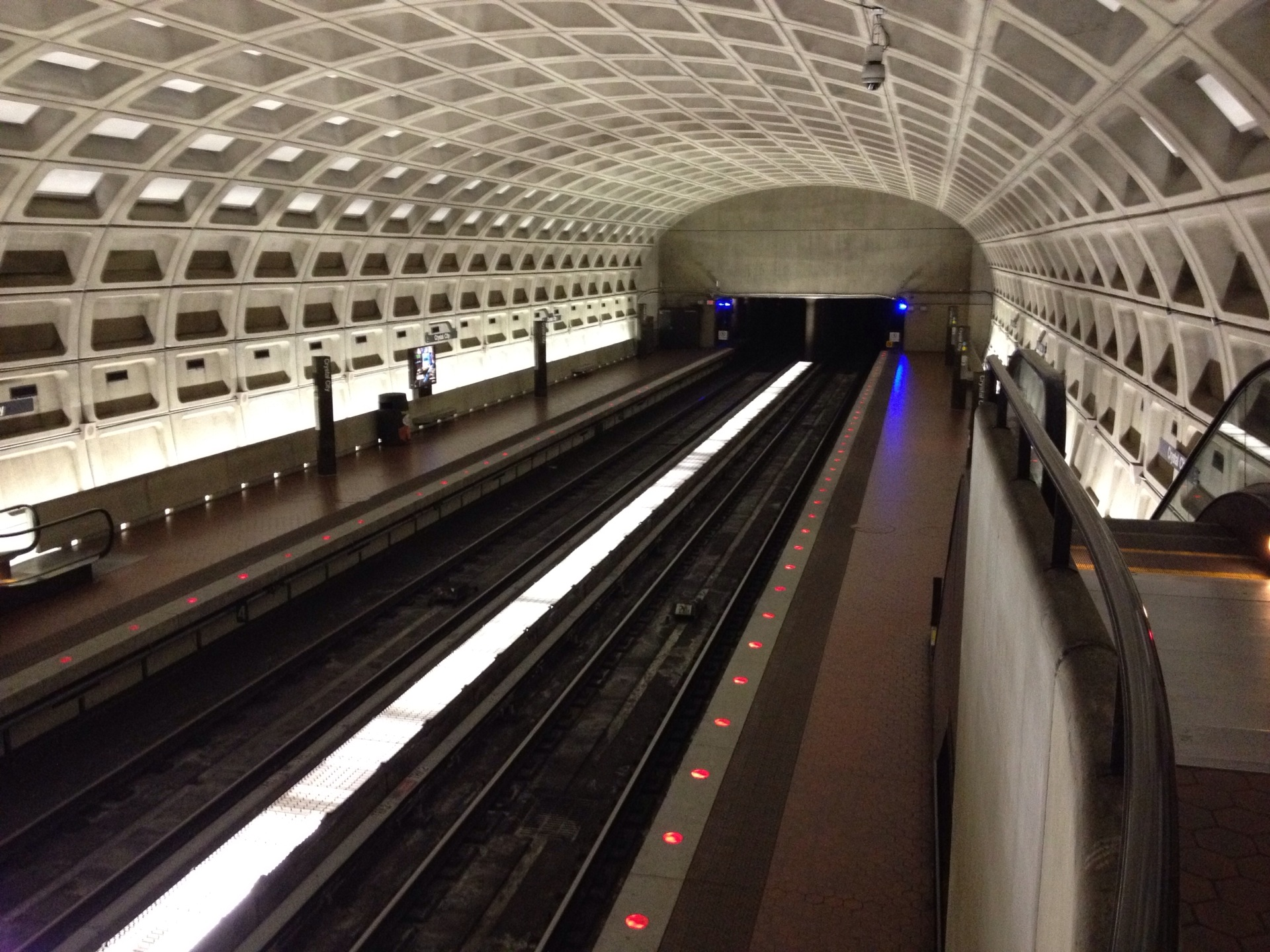
- Crystal City station in 2013

General information
- Location: 18th Street South and South Bell Street; Arlington, Virginia
- Coordinates: 38.857856°N 77.050874°W
- Owner: Washington Metropolitan Area Transit Authority
- Platforms: 2 side platforms
- Tracks: 2
- Connections: VRE at Crystal City; Arlington Transit: 43; Fairfax Connector: 598, 599; Metrobus: A11, A1X, A40; PRTC OmniRide; Loudoun County Transit

Construction
- Structure type: Underground
- Cycle facilities: Capital Bikeshare, 10 racks
- Accessible: Yes

Other information
- Station code: C09

History
- Opened: July 1, 1977

Passengers
- 2025: 6,253 (average weekday)
- Rank: 20 of 98

Services
Preceding station	Washington Metro	Following station
National Airport toward Huntington	Yellow Line	Pentagon City toward Mount Vernon Square or Greenbelt
National Airport toward Franconia–Springfield	Blue Line	Pentagon City toward Downtown Largo
Preceding station	Metroway	Following station
18th & Crystal One-way operation	Potomac Yard	Pentagon City Terminus
23rd & Clark toward Braddock Road	Potomac Yard	Pentagon City Terminus
Route map
Location

Crystal City station is an underground Washington Metro station in the Crystal City neighborhood of Arlington County, Virginia, United States. The station opened on July 1, 1977, and serves the Blue Line and Yellow Line services, with a Metroway bus rapid transit stop on the surface.

== Station layout ==
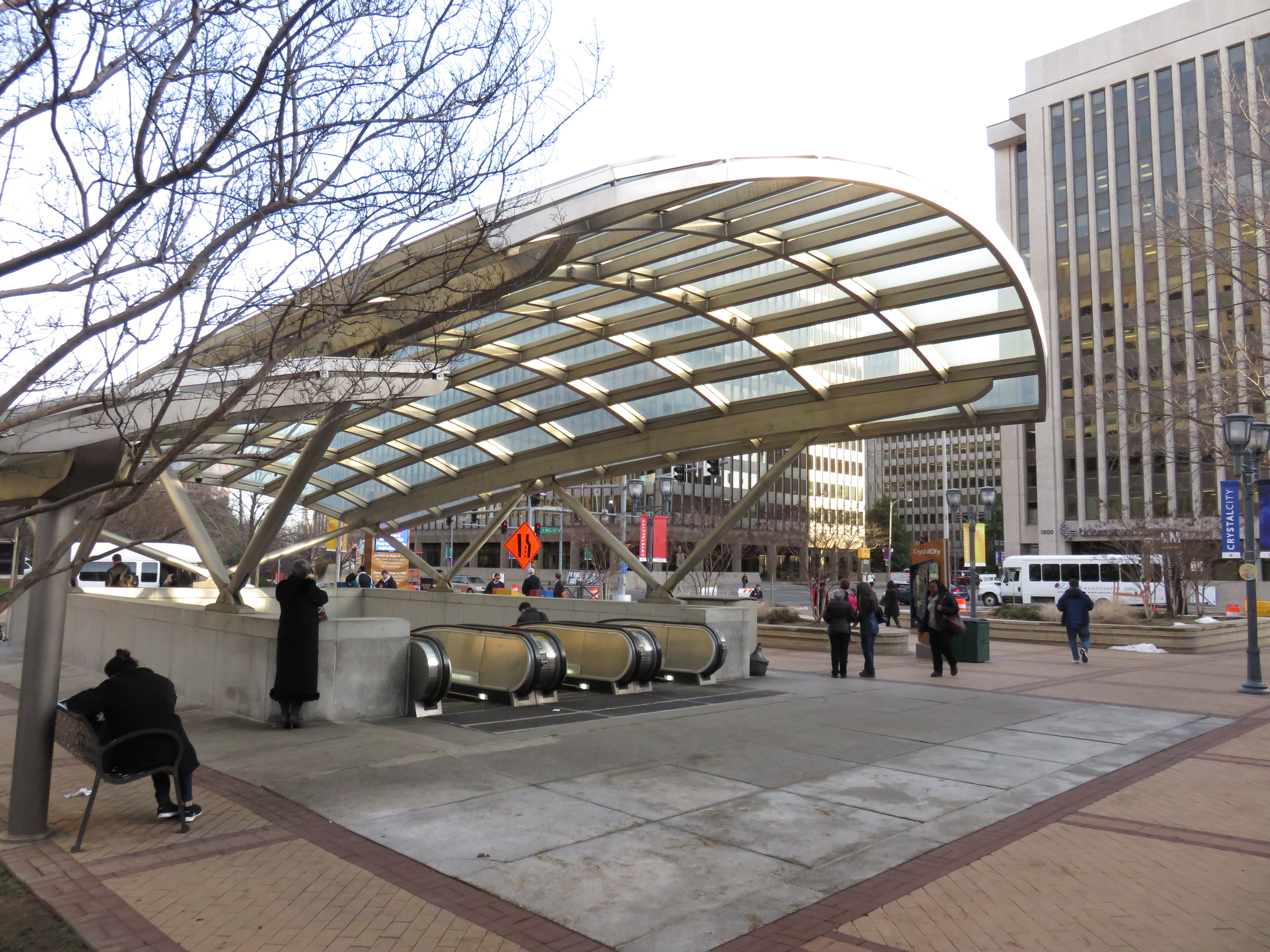
The station entrance in 2016

The station has two side platforms in a cylindrical vault, which runs east–west under plazas on the north side of 18th Street South between Jefferson Davis Highway and Crystal Drive. The fare mezzanine is located above the center of the platforms. The single station entrance is on the northwest corner of 18th Street South and South Bell Street, with a bank of escalators leading to an upper mezzanine.

Located outside the station vault, the upper mezzanine has direct entrances to the underground Crystal City Shops. An elevator on the northeast corner of 18th Street South and South Bell Street connects directly to the lower mezzanine; each platform has one elevator from the mezzanine. Bus stops, including a Metroway stop served by both northbound and southbound buses, are located on South Bell Street under the 251 18th Street South building.

== History ==
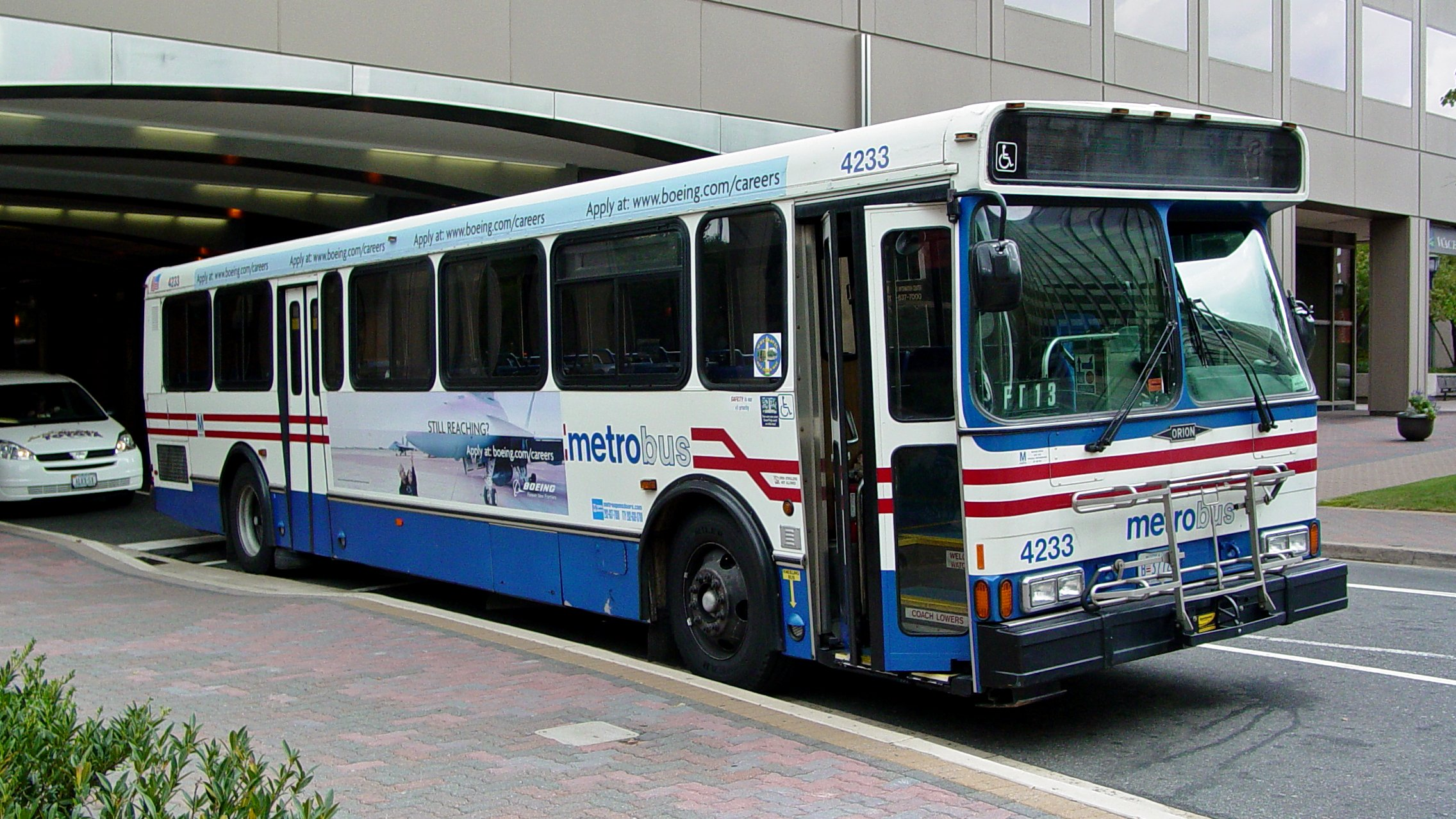
Metrobus at the station in 2005

The station opened on July 1, 1977, part of the 11.8-mile (19 km) initial segment of the Blue Line between National Airport and Stadium–Armory stations that opened that day.

Virginia Railway Express began service in June 1992, with its Crystal City station about 0.2 miles (0.32 km) northeast of the Metro entrance. Metroway bus rapid transit service began on August 24, 2014, with a stop on Bell Street adjacent to the Metro entrance.

=== Second entrance ===
An east entrance to the station was proposed in a 2002 WMATA study. Planning for the second entrance began in 2011. A 2014 study identified five possible locations for the new entrance, with locations on the northeast and northwest corners of 18th Street South and Crystal Drive preferred. In February 2019, the state committed to building the entrance as part of a package of transportation improvements for the construction of Amazon HQ2 in National Landing.

In May 2019, property developer JBG Smith sent an unsolicited proposal, proposing that Arlington County pay the company to act as design-build contractor for the entrance on company-owned property. The county and company signed a preliminary agreement in June 2020. Design of the second entrance reached 30% in March 2021.

In March 2022, plans were changed from an underground to a surface-level fare lobby to reduce costs. In July 2023, the Arlington County Board awarded a $117 million design-build contract for the entrance to a joint venture of JBG Smith and Clark Construction. A groundbreaking ceremony took place on July 12, 2024, one month after construction started. The new entrance is expected to open in 2027.
