= Braddock Road station =

Washington Metro station in Virginia, US

Braddock Road
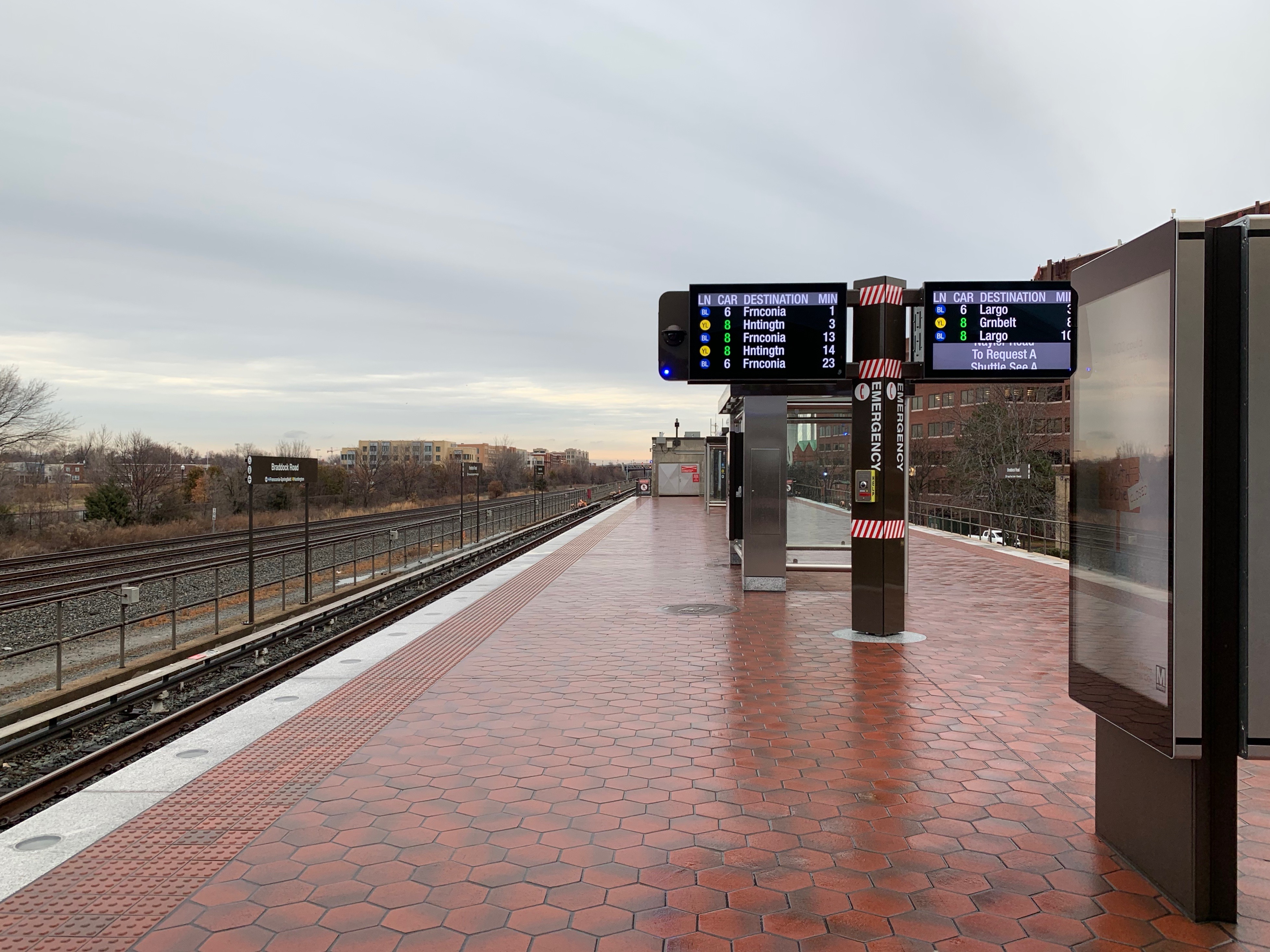
- Braddock Road station platform looking northeast in January 2020

General information
- Location: 700 North West Street; Alexandria, Virginia
- Coordinates: 38°48′50″N 77°03′14″W
- Owner: Washington Metropolitan Area Transit Authority
- Platforms: 1 island platform
- Tracks: 2
- Connections: DASH: 30, 31, 103, 104; Metrobus: A11, A12, A1X

Construction
- Structure type: Embankment
- Parking: 10 spaces (parking meters)
- Cycle facilities: Capital Bikeshare, 46 racks, 12 lockers
- Accessible: yes

Other information
- Station code: C12

History
- Opened: December 17, 1983; 42 years ago
- Rebuilt: 2019

Passengers
- 2025: 2,891 (average weekday)
- Rank: 61 of 98

Services
Preceding station	Washington Metro	Following station
King Street–Old Town toward Huntington	Yellow Line	Potomac Yard toward Mount Vernon Square or Greenbelt
King Street–Old Town toward Franconia–Springfield	Blue Line	Potomac Yard toward Downtown Largo
Out-of-system interchange
Preceding station	Metroway	Following station
Terminus	Potomac Yard	Fayette toward Pentagon City
Route map
Location

Braddock Road station is an island-platformed Washington Metro station in Alexandria, Virginia, United States. The station was opened on December 17, 1983, and is operated by the Washington Metropolitan Area Transit Authority (WMATA). Providing service for both the Blue and Yellow Lines, the station is located at Braddock Road and West Street.

== History ==
Originally scheduled to open in summer 1982, its opening was delayed because of both unavailability of new subway cars and the lack of a test track. Construction of the station was complete by summer 1982, and in September 1983 Metro announced the station would open that December as the new cars would be ready for service. The station opened on December 17, 1983. Its opening coincided with the completion of 4.2 miles (6.8 km) of rail between National Airport and Huntington and the opening of the Eisenhower Avenue, Huntington and King Street–Old Town stations.

In 2012, a Capital Bikeshare station was installed across the street as part of Alexandria's initial bikeshare expansion and another station was added closer to the entrance in early 2022.

In 2014, the Metroway Bus Rapid Transit system began service with Braddock Road station serving as the southern terminus.

In May 2018, Metro announced an extensive renovation of platforms at twenty stations across the system. The Blue and Yellow Lines south of Ronald Reagan Washington National Airport station, including the Braddock Road station, would be closed from May to September 2019, during which the platforms at this station would be rebuilt.

Between September 10 and November 5, 2022, Braddock Road was closed due to the Potomac Yard station tie-in, closing all stations south of Ronald Reagan Washington National Airport station. Shuttle buses were provided throughout the shutdown.

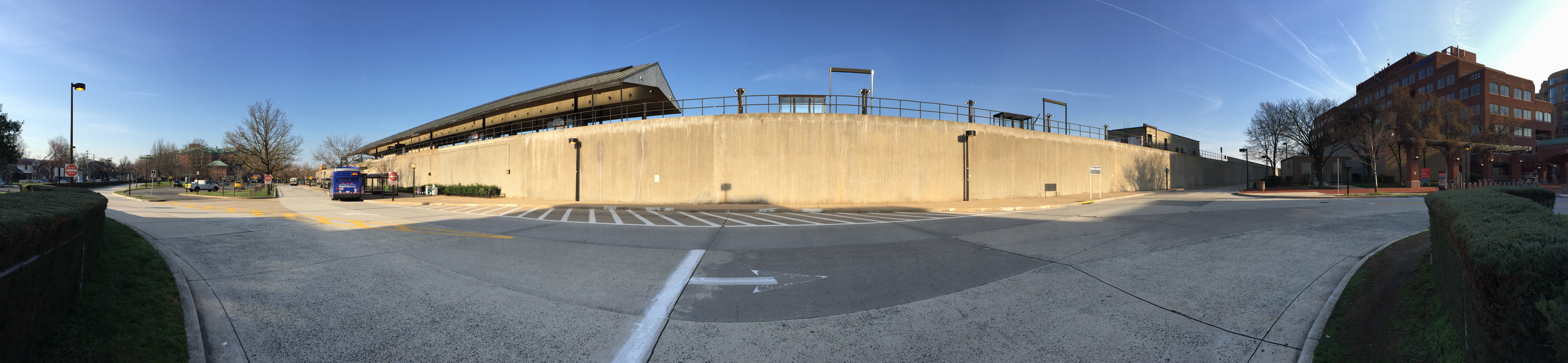
Panoramic image of the exterior of the station in March 2016

== Station layout ==
Access to the island platform is provided by one pair of escalators and one elevator. The Metro tracks and platform are on an embankment relative to street level, supported by a concrete retaining wall. West of the platform are the three tracks of the RF&P Subdivision, which carry Amtrak and Virginia Railway Express trains, while east of the platform there are bus bays serving DASH and Metrobus and a small metered parking lot.

P Platform level	Track 3	← Fredericksburg Line, Manassas Line and Amtrak do not stop →
P Platform level	Track 2	← Fredericksburg Line, Manassas Line and Amtrak do not stop →
P Platform level	Track 1	← Fredericksburg Line, Manassas Line and Amtrak do not stop →
P Platform level	Southbound	← toward Franconia–Springfield (King Street–Old Town) ← toward Huntington (King Street–Old Town)
P Platform level	Island platform
P Platform level	Northbound	toward Downtown Largo (Potomac Yard) → toward Greenbelt (Potomac Yard) →
G	Street level	Exit/entrance, buses, parking, fare control, ticket machines, station agent
