= Huntington Line =

Huntington Line may refer to:

- Blue Line (Washington Metro), the original planned designation of the line terminating at Huntington, Virginia, and has operated trains to Huntington at various times since
- Yellow Line (Washington Metro), whose southern terminus is Huntington, Virginia
- Port Jefferson Branch, on the Long Island Railroad, on which all electric trains terminate at Huntington
