= Pentagon City station =

Washington Metro station in Virginia, US

Pentagon City
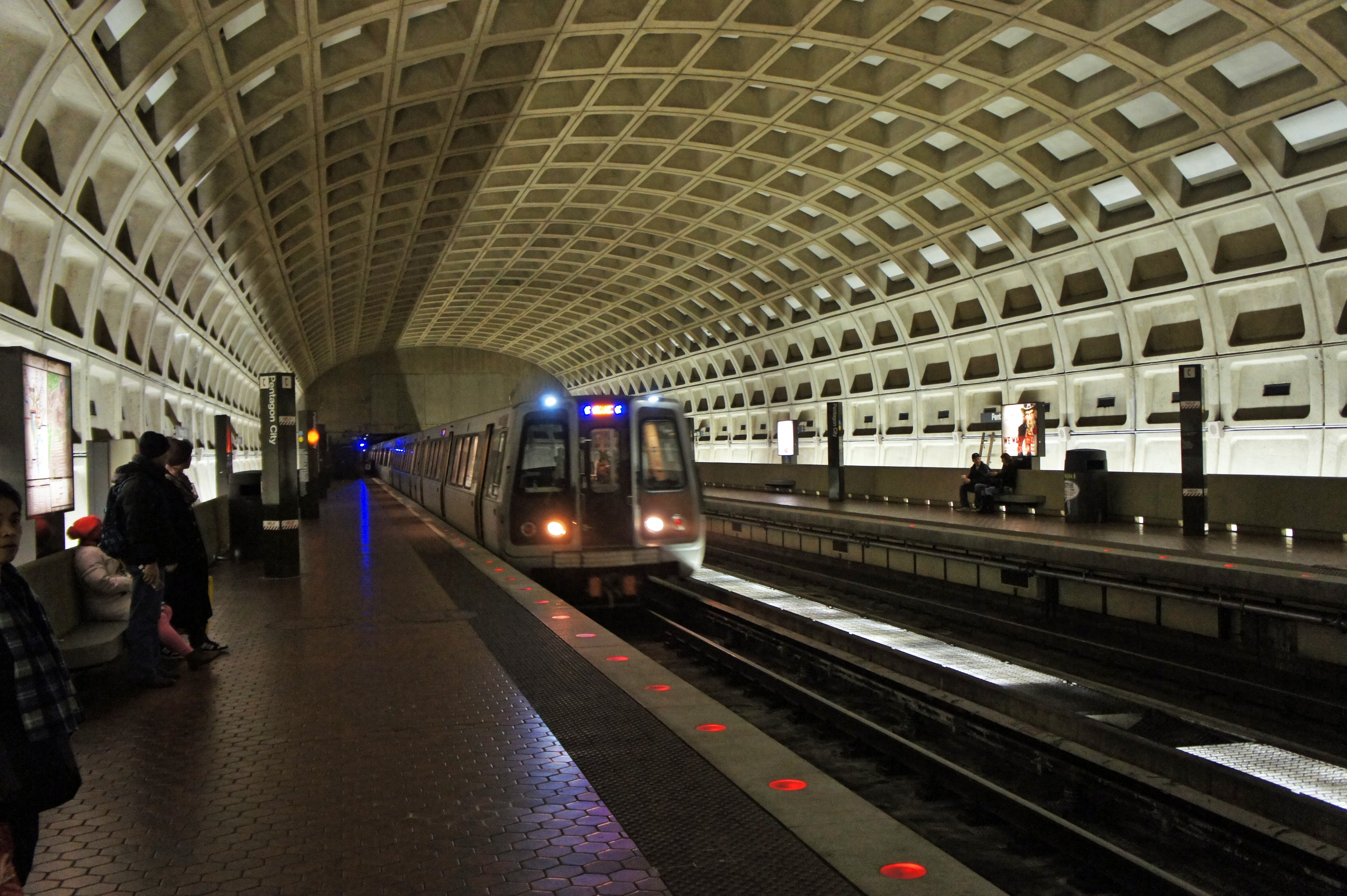
- Blue Line train at Pentagon City in December 2011

General information
- Location: 1250 South Hayes Street; Arlington, Virginia
- Coordinates: 38.86271°N 77.059468°W
- Owner: Washington Metropolitan Area Transit Authority
- Platforms: 2 side platforms
- Tracks: 2
- Connections: Arlington Transit: 42, 74, 84, 87; Fairfax Connector: 598, 599; Metrobus: A11, A1X, A27, A40, A66, F44

Construction
- Structure type: Underground
- Cycle facilities: Capital Bikeshare, 8 racks, 22 lockers
- Accessible: Yes

Other information
- Station code: C08

History
- Opened: July 1, 1977

Passengers
- 2025: 9,534 (average weekday)
- Rank: 12 of 98

Services
Preceding station	Washington Metro	Following station
Crystal City toward Huntington	Yellow Line	Pentagon toward Mount Vernon Square or Greenbelt
Crystal City toward Franconia–Springfield	Blue Line	Pentagon toward Downtown Largo
Preceding station	Metroway	Following station
Crystal City toward Braddock Road	Potomac Yard	Terminus
Route map
Location

Pentagon City station is an underground Washington Metro station in the Pentagon City neighborhood of Arlington County, Virginia, United States. It serves the Blue and Yellow Lines.

== History ==
The station was opened on July 1, 1977, along with 16 other stations as part of the 11.8-mile (19.0 km) segment between National Airport and Stadium–Armory.

On April 17, 2016, the Metroway bus rapid transit system was extended to Pentagon City, with the station becoming the northern terminus.

In February 2021, the Arlington County Board awarded a $6.5 million construction contract to add a second surface elevator to the station. Renovation of the existing elevator began on July 16, 2025; the new elevator opened on September 17, 2025.

== Station layout ==
Pentagon City station has two underground side platforms serving two tracks. The station has four entrances from the mezzanine level, which runs under Hayes Street: entrances from the east and west sides of Hayes Street via escalator, a direct entrance from the Fashion Centre at Pentagon City, and an entrance from the northeast corner of the 12th and Hayes Street intersection. The pedestrian tunnel for the latter entrance was built in 1984 but did not open to the public until 2018. Additionally, a provision exists at the station's south end for a future second mezzanine, with knock-out panels visible above the tracks on the station's south wall.
