= Potomac Yard =

Neighborhood in Northern Virginia

Coordinates: 38°49′47″N 77°02′59″W

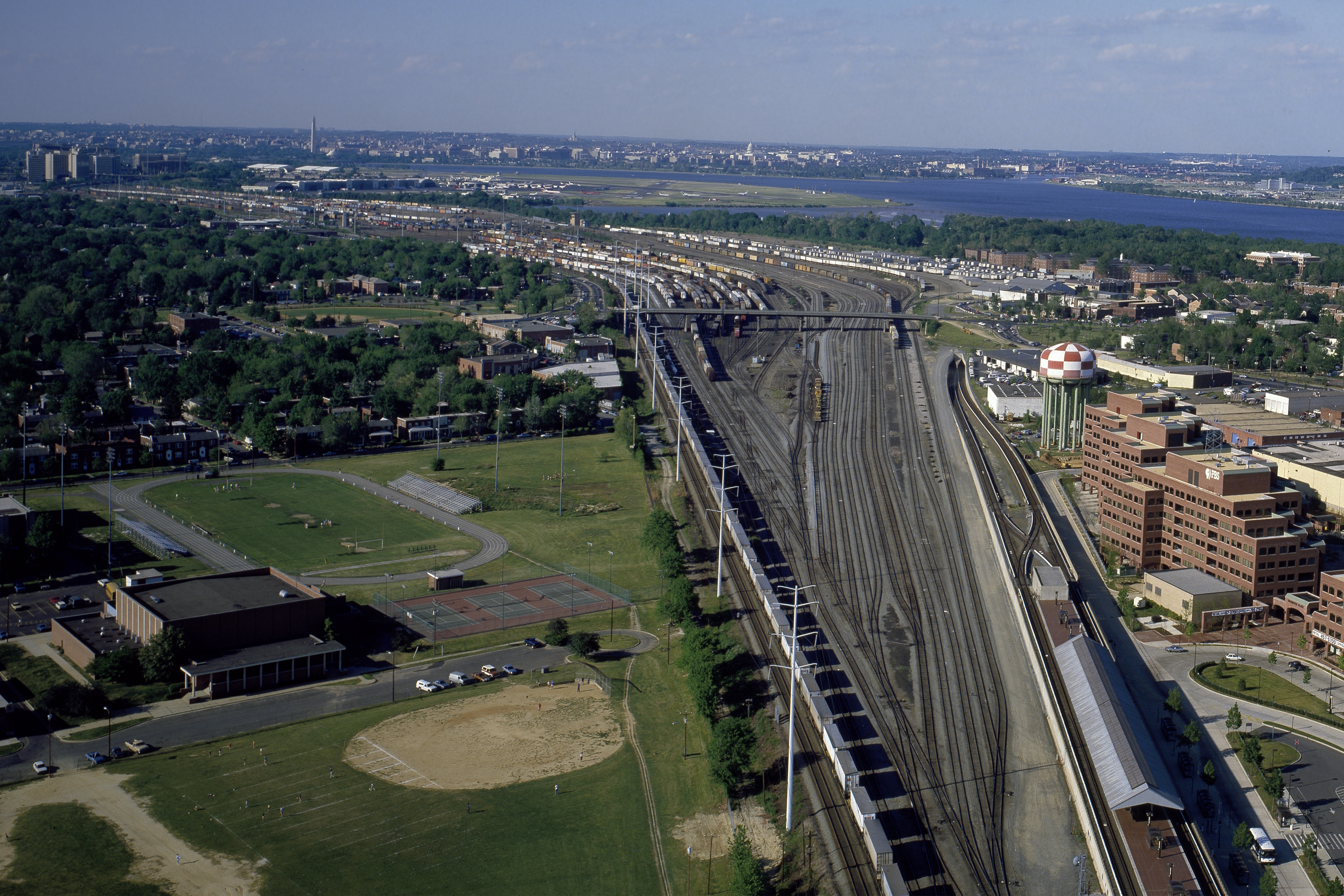
Potomac Yard as a rail yard in the 1980s

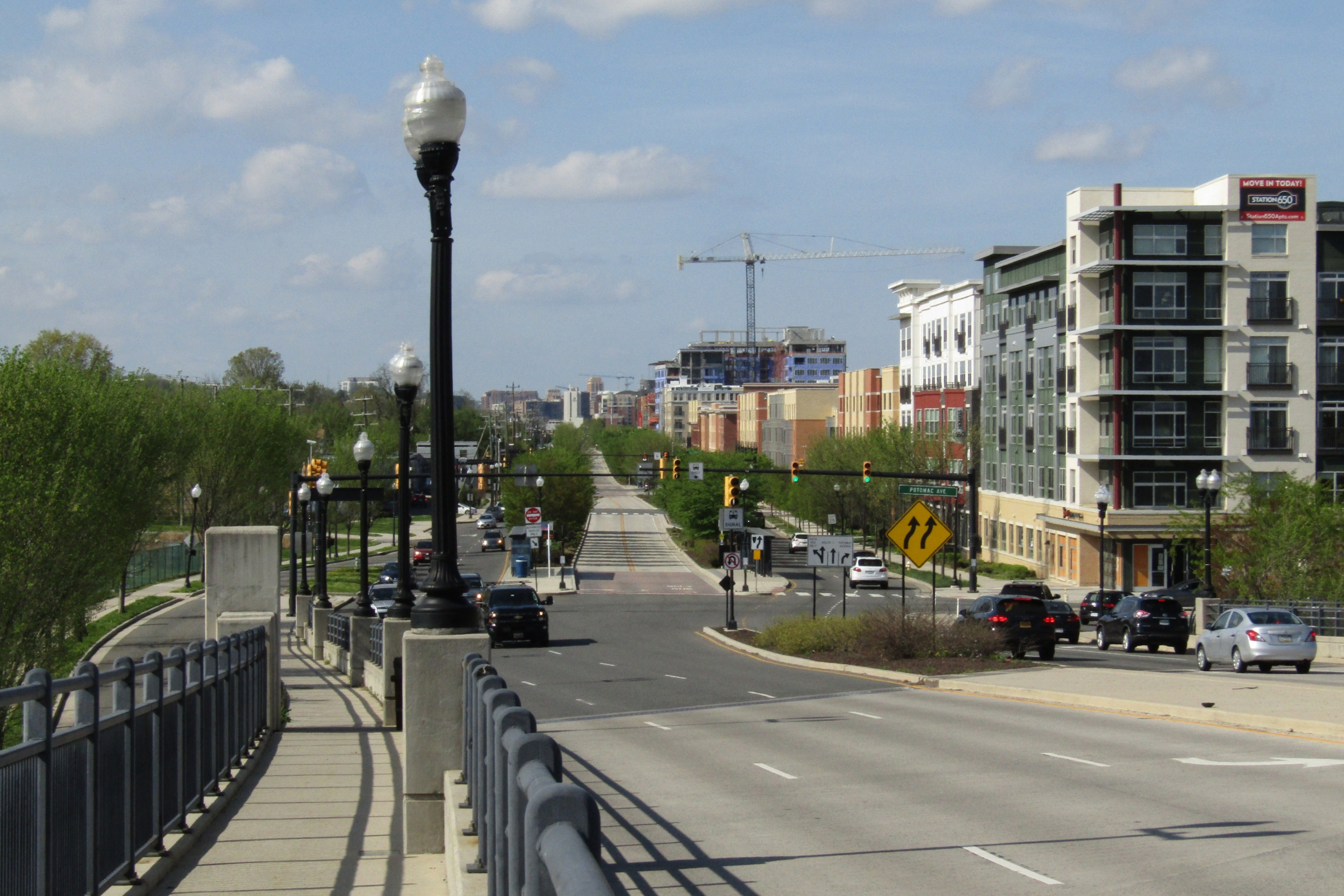
Potomac Yard as a mixed-use neighborhood in 2021

Potomac Yard is a neighborhood in Northern Virginia that straddles southeastern Arlington County and northeastern Alexandria, Virginia, located principally in the area between U.S. Route 1 and the Washington Metro Blue Line /Yellow Line tracks, or the George Washington Memorial Parkway, depending on the definition used. The area was home to (and takes its name from) what was once one of the busiest rail yards on the Eastern Seaboard of the United States. The "Potomac Yard" name is also used to refer to several developments in the area, especially the Potomac Yard Center power center and a Washington Metro station.

In 2018, Amazon announced plans to locate part of its "HQ2" second headquarters project in Northern Virginia, specifically in the newly re-branded cross-jurisdictional neighborhood of National Landing, which local and state officials said would include Potomac Yard as well as nearby parts of southern Arlington, including the Crystal City neighborhood that will be the hub of the HQ2 development. Amazon initially planned to split HQ2 between National Landing and Long Island City, New York, but opposition from New York officials led Amazon to cancel that portion of the project, leaving National Landing as the only HQ2 site.

Prior to Amazon's selection of National Landing, Virginia Tech had stated it would establish an "Innovation Campus" in the Alexandria portion of the neighborhood.

== History ==
English settlers built several plantations on the site in the eigtheenth century. The land, much of it owned by the Swann and Daingerfield families, became part of Alexandria County, D.C. with the creation of the District of Columbia in 1791, and retroceded to Virginia in 1846.

Its role as a transportation hub began when Congress chartered the Alexandria Canal Company in 1830. The canal, which opened on December 2, 1843, would connect the port of Alexandria with the end of the Chesapeake and Ohio Canal (completed 1850) in Georgetown via the Potomac Aqueduct Bridge. It would operate until abandoned in 1886.

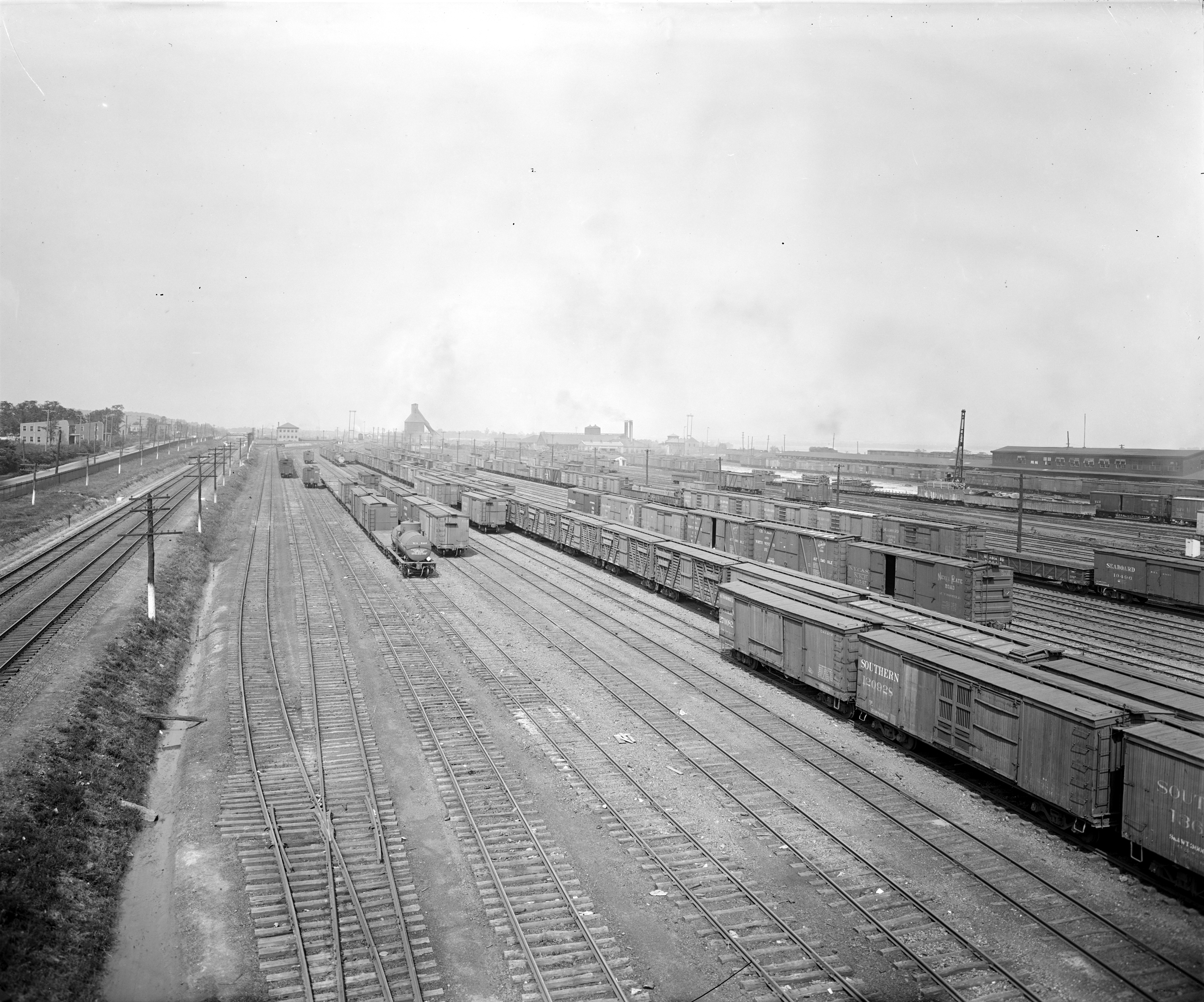
Potomac Yard, circa 1917

Railroad development in the area began in the 1850s, though stymied by political concerns and by the American Civil War. The Alexandria and Washington Railroad began service on a new rail line between Long Bridge and Alexandria in 1857. Order to the region's mishmash of active and abandoned rail lines and stations did not come until the City Beautiful movement of the late 19th century. The 1901 Plan for Washington, D.C., the report of the McMillan Commission, proposed consolidating the region's rail operations, including a new Washington Union Station, which was approved in 1903 and completed 1908, and a New Long Railroad Bridge (completed 1904).

In accordance with the plan, the Pennsylvania Railroad (PRR), Baltimore and Ohio Railroad, Southern Railway, Chesapeake and Ohio Railway, Atlantic Coast Line Railroad, and Seaboard Air Line Railway formed the Richmond-Washington Company to manage traffic. This holding company controlled the Richmond, Fredericksburg and Potomac Railroad (RF&P), the new Alexandria Union Station, which opened in 1905, and the new switching yard—Potomac Yard—which opened on October 15, 1906.

The booming "Pot Yard" attracted thousands of workers, who largely settled in the areas of Del Ray and St. Elmo. These subdivisions incorporated as the town of Potomac in 1908, but were annexed by the City of Alexandria in 1930.

Potomac Yard in its heyday was one of the busiest railyards in the Eastern United States, processing thousands of cars daily. The PRR extended its railway electrification program to Potomac Yard in 1935, marking its southernmost point. The Penn Central segment of the famous Tropicana Juice Train operated from here. The site reached capacity in 1937.

After the corporate mergers of the former separate railroad companies that used the yard to interchange freight cars, the need for Potomac Yard greatly diminished. It was determined by the RF&P that the land was worth more than the need for yard switching. The PRR's old catenary was dismantled in the 1980s. The facility was identified as a toxic waste site in 1987. The RF&P finally decommissioned it in 1989. Plans for rehabilitation and redevelopment of the land have been a source of intense debate since then.

== Redevelopment ==
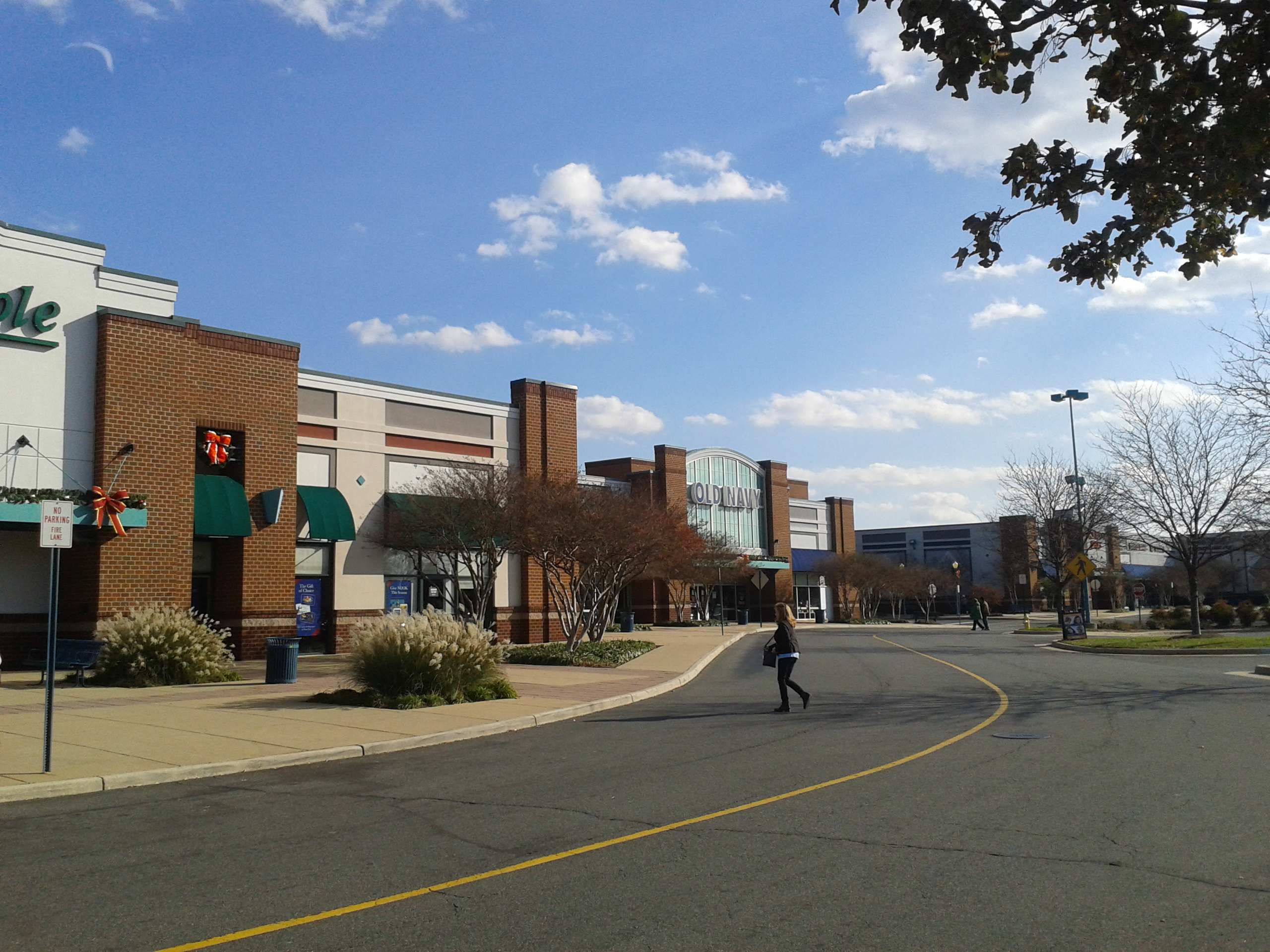
Potomac Yard shopping center (2014).

At decommissioning, decades of industrial use had left the site contaminated with heavy metals and hydrocarbons, including diesel fuel. It was immediately declared a Superfund site.

In 1995, the Environmental Protection Agency (EPA) approved RF&P's study and cleanup plan, and cleanup was declared completed by 1998.

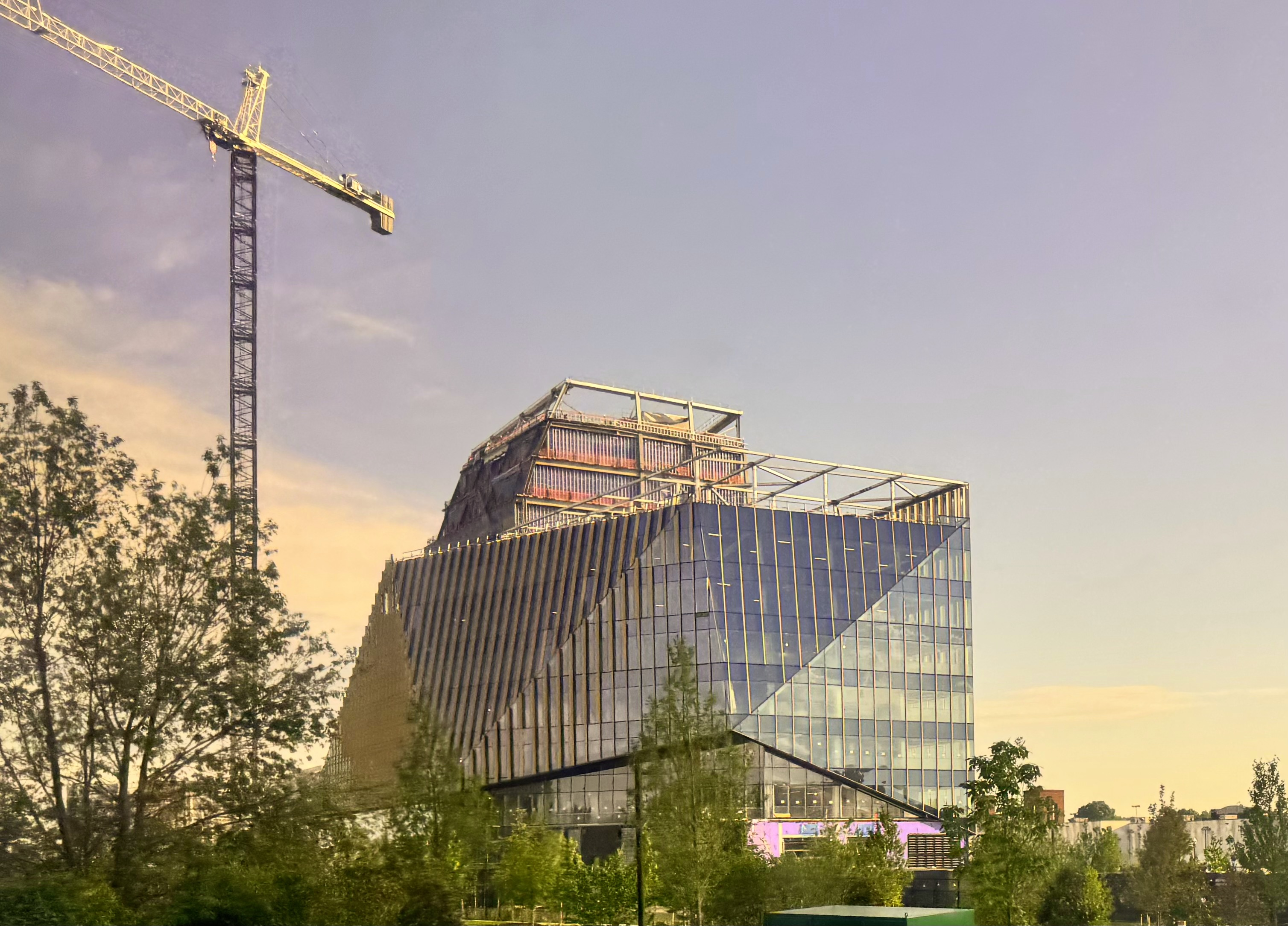
Construction of a Virginia Tech building (2024).

Various commercial and community interest groups came into conflict over the future of the brownfield land. The City of Alexandria rejected the original mixed-use plan in 1992. Jack Kent Cooke, owner of the then Washington Redskins, unsuccessfully pushed for the construction of a new football stadium on the site. Seventy (28 ha) of the 400 acres (160 ha) of the site were approved for retail use in 1995; the Potomac Yard Center, a 589,856-square-foot (54,799 m^{2}) strip mall anchored by big box stores, was completed in 1997. Other sections of Potomac Yard have since been slated for development as residential units, office space, parkland, and retail use. The Potomac Yard Complex by Crescent Resources is already under construction.

In November 2005, One and Two Potomac Center were completed, housing several EPA offices. The southernmost portion of the Alexandria section is under construction as of August 2006. It includes two plans, one for Arlington and one for Alexandria. The Alexandria portion of the site is highlighted by a new Town Center. The plan also includes 1,900,000 square feet (180,000 m^{2}) of office space; a 625-room hotel; 135,000 square feet (12,500 m^{2}) of neighborhood retail space; and approximately 1,900 residential units. The plan for the Arlington site includes 2,800,000 square feet (260,000 m^{2}) of office space; a 625-room hotel; 100,000 square feet (9,300 m^{2}) of neighborhood retail space; and approximately 1000 residential units. The plan also calls for a 25-acre (10 ha) park, to be owned by Arlington County.

In December 2023, it was announced that the Washington Capitals and Washington Wizards would move to a new arena to be built at Potomac Yard. The site was to include training facilities, team offices, and a performing arts venue. Plans for the new arena were scrapped in March 2024.

== Potomac Yard Park ==
Construction for Potomac Yard Park began in 2009, and it opened on December 14, 2013. The park contains a water fountain, playgrounds, and sports fields within 24 acres. Located south of the main shopping district, it borders train tracks carrying freight and Virginia Railway Express commuter rail.

The city of Alexandria has erected a series of seven signs in Potomac Yard Park that sequentially describe and illustrate the history of the area. These include:

Point 1: Virginia's First Highways
Point 2: The Alexanders & Agriculture
Point 3: Building Potomac Yard
Point 4: The People of Potomac Yard
Point 5: Crossroads of Transportation
Point 6: The Rail Yard Hump
Point 7: Potomac Yard In Transition

== Transportation ==
Bus rapid transit from Crystal City to Potomac Yard opened in August 2014. Branded as Metroway, it travels in dedicated lanes along U.S. Route 1. A Washington Metro infill station opened on May 19, 2023, after a previously scheduled opening date of April 2022 was pushed back due to a safety issue with the automatic train control systems.

A streetcar system in Northern Virginia was proposed to open in 2020, with trains traveling between Potomac Yard, Crystal City, Pentagon City, and Bailey's Crossroads. In late November 2014 the Arlington County Board cancelled the streetcar plan.
