= Potomac Yard station =

Washington Metro station in Virginia, US

Potomac Yard VT
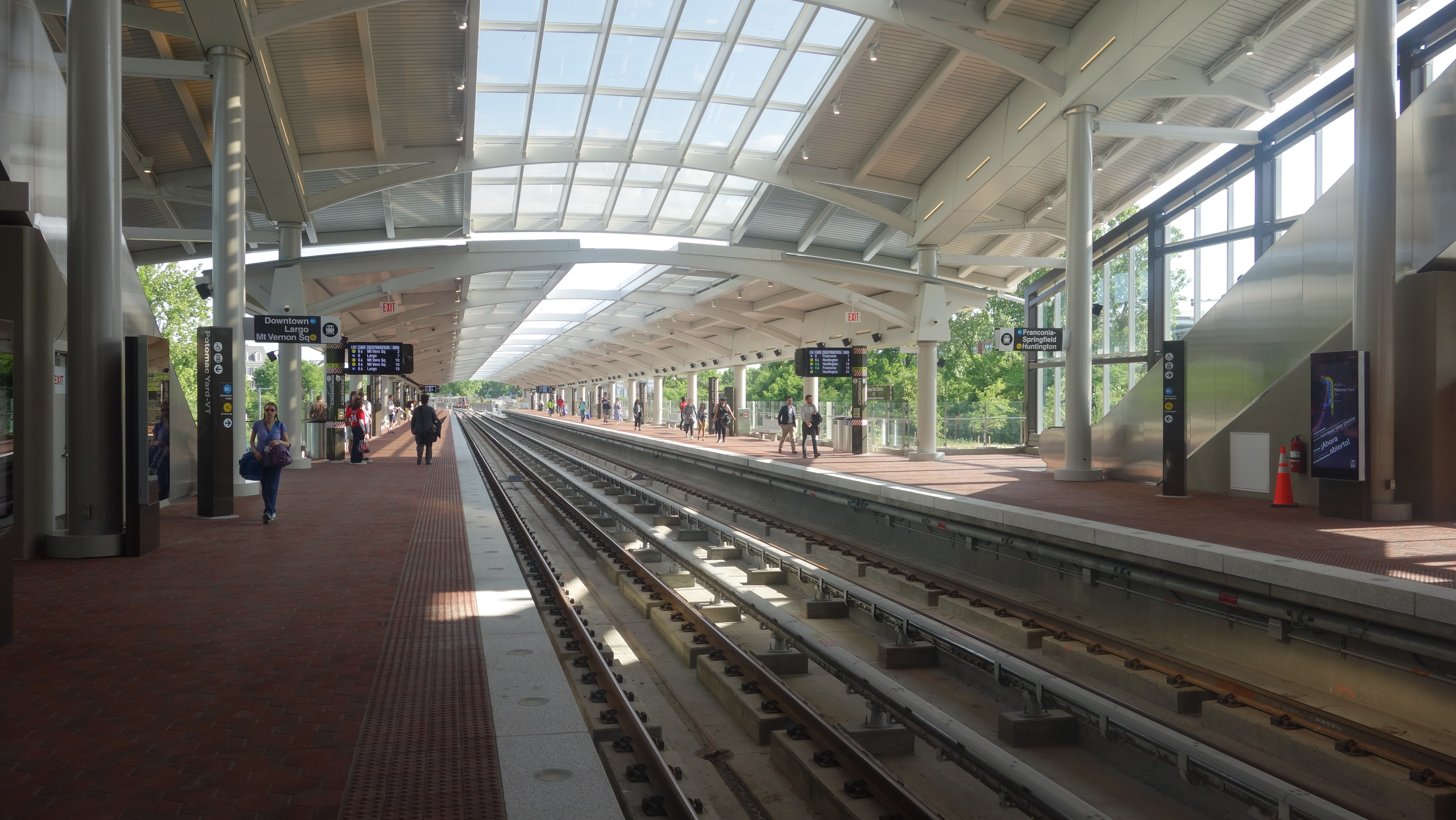
- The station's platform on opening day, May 19, 2023

General information
- Location: 3001 Potomac Avenue (South Pavilion); 3201 University Drive (North Pavilion); Alexandria, Virginia
- Coordinates: 38.83335°N 77.04635°W
- Owner: Washington Metropolitan Area Transit Authority
- Platforms: 2 side platforms
- Tracks: 2
- Connections: DASH: 33, 34, 36A, 36B; Metrobus: A1X, A70

Construction
- Structure type: At-grade
- Cycle facilities: Capital Bikeshare, 17 racks, secure storage room
- Accessible: yes

Other information
- Station code: C11

History
- Opened: May 19, 2023; 3 years ago

Passengers
- 2025: 1,908 (average weekday)
- Rank: 80 of 98

Services
Preceding station	Washington Metro	Following station
Braddock Road toward Huntington	Yellow Line	National Airport toward Mount Vernon Square or Greenbelt
Braddock Road toward Franconia–Springfield	Blue Line	National Airport toward Downtown Largo
Route map
Location

Potomac Yard station is a Washington Metro station in Alexandria, Virginia, United States. It is operated by the Washington Metropolitan Area Transit Authority (WMATA), serving both the Blue and Yellow Lines, and opened on May 19, 2023. It is located at Alexandria's 7.5-million-square-foot (700,000 m^{2}) Potomac Yard mixed-use development bounded by Richmond Highway (U.S. Route 1) and the George Washington Memorial Parkway. It is the second infill station to be added to the Washington Metro system, after NoMa–Gallaudet U in 2004. It was constructed on the site of Potomac Yard, a former railroad freight yard.

== Station layout ==
The station is on the eastern side of the RF&P Subdivision and the western side of the George Washington Memorial Parkway. It is located on the other side of the railroad tracks from Potomac Yard, which is located on the western side of the tracks. The station does not have any parking or kiss and ride facilities, although private facilities exist nearby. The station has two side platforms flanking the line's two tracks.

A footbridge over the RF&P Subdivision tracks connects the north end of the station with two headhouses in the Potomac Yard development. A third entrance is located on Potomac Greens Drive on the east side of the station.

=== Naming ===
The station is named after Potomac Yard (a former rail yard being redeveloped as a mixed-use development) and Virginia Tech. Virginia Tech pushed to include its initials in the station's primary name to bring attention to its Innovation Campus located nearby, which was planned to open in 2024. The Alexandria City Council unanimously approved the decision on September 22, 2020. Following the results of a public survey conducted by WMATA between November 17, 2020, and November 20, 2020, its board of directors unanimously approved the decision on December 10, 2020.

=== Design and artwork ===
The surrounding development and the station's proximity to the George Washington Memorial Parkway gave it unique design elements from the rest of the Washington Metro's stations. This includes its interior architecture being partially inspired by Thorncrown Chapel in Eureka Springs, Arkansas, and its exterior featuring natural stone and brown steel blending into the surrounding area. The station is also one of the first rail stations in the United States, and by extension, North America, to receive a Leadership in Energy and Environmental Design (LEED) certification from the U.S. Green Building Council since it includes many sustainable design elements; being awarded LEED Gold status.

The station features a piece of public art by Rob Ley at each entrance pavilion. A Subtle Trip, 2023 wraps around the outside of the mezzanine of the south pavilion and consists of painted aluminum shapes in a pattern of Virginia bluebells. Fieldwalking, 2023 is located on the front of the elevator tower in the North Pavilion. It consists of painted aluminum shapes in a pattern of cherry blossoms. The artwork is part of the Art in Transit program and was funded by the city of Alexandria.

== History ==
=== Background ===
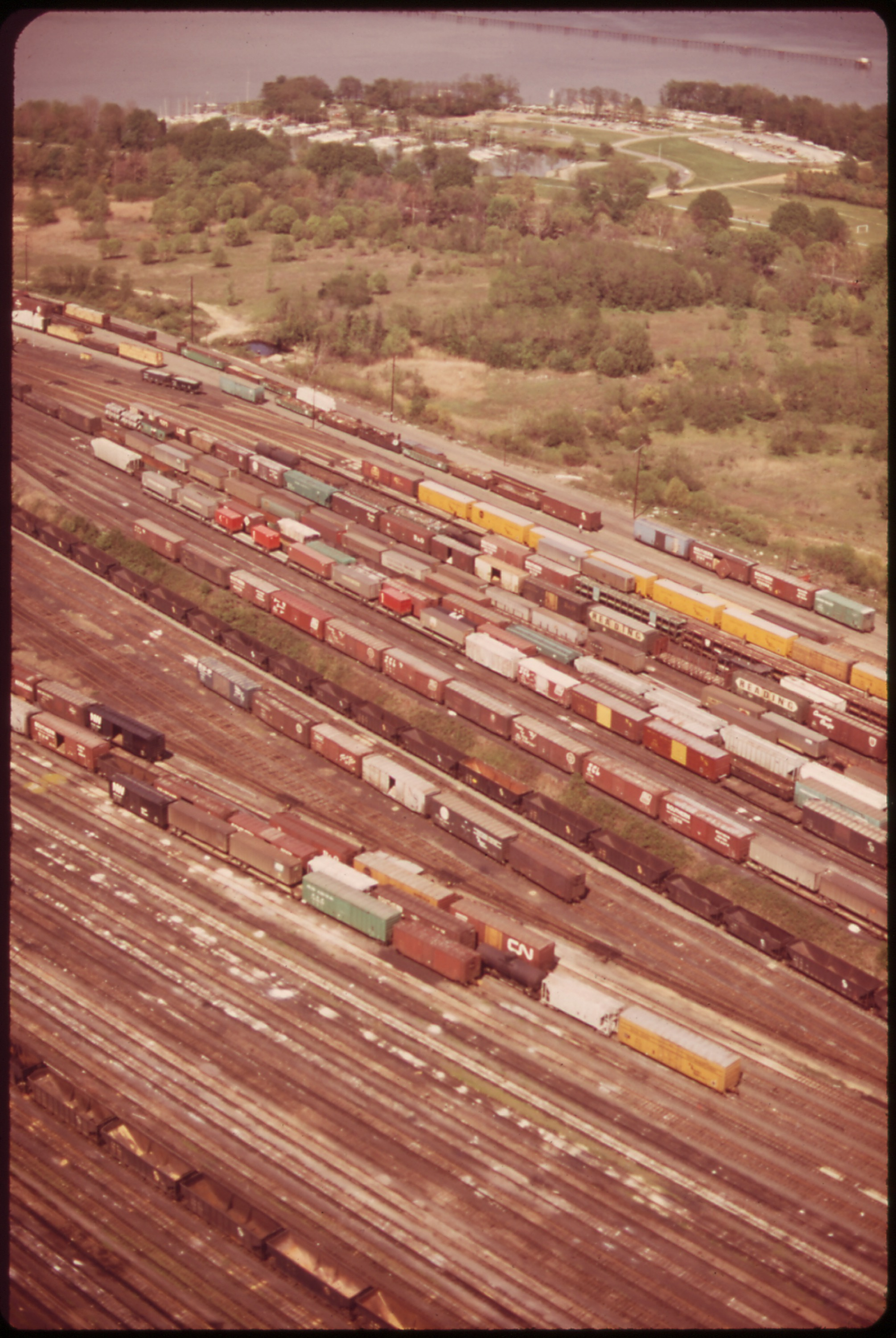
The eponymous Potomac Yard in 1973

Potomac Yard was one of the busiest rail yards in the Eastern United States, processing thousands of cars daily from 1906 to 1982. Following its closure, various proposals were made to redevelop the area in the 1980s and 1990s.

In the late 1990s, the 300-acre (120 ha) Potomac Yard retail and residential redevelopment began with the construction of the Potomac Yard Shopping Center. This included proposals to construct a Washington Metro station between the Braddock Road and National Airport stations on the Blue and Yellow Lines. The area of Metrorail at Potomac Yard was initially constructed in a way to allow for a future station.

In June 2008, Alexandria's Planning Commission approved higher-density projects at a town center near the proposed Potomac Yard station site. The first official public meeting on the prospect of the Potomac Yard station was held on February 19, 2009, between Alexandria city officials and the Metrorail Station Feasibility Work Group in Alexandria City Hall.

On June 12, 2010, the Alexandria City Council voted to rezone the 69 acres (28 ha) North Potomac Yard area to convert the 600,000-square-foot (56,000 m^{2}) big-box Potomac Yard Shopping Center into a 7.5 million square feet (700,000 m^{2}) mixed-use development centered around the proposed station.

=== Estimated costs and financing ===
The estimation of costs for constructing the Potomac Yard station increased from $150 million in February 2009 (equivalent to $213 million in 2024) to $240 million in December 2010 (equivalent to $336 million in 2024). Funding for the station's construction costs is to be partly provided by the city of Alexandria and the Washington Metropolitan Area Transit Authority with the bulk of the funding coming from property owners near the station. CPYR, the Potomac Yard Shopping Center owner, will contribute $81 million, and the city of Alexandria will float about $275 million in bonds to pay for its portion. The addition of the station to the Blue and Yellow Lines will cost roughly $500,000 in fiscal 2010 dollars to operate annually. Alexandria city officials proposed two special tax districts that would supplement developer CPYR's contributions and tax increment financing to cover the cost of the $240 million Metro station and its debt service, totaling an estimated $496.6 million.

On December 18, 2010, the Alexandria City Council unanimously approved a package that funded a large portion of the construction and operations of the proposed Potomac Yard station through the creation of the city's first special tax district. To fund the proposed $240 million construction cost of the Potomac Yard station, the Alexandria City Council approved a 20-cent special tax district for the Potomac Yard development. The projected cost to build the Potomac Yard station and the debt servicing paid over 30 years will be approximately $500 million. The 20-cent special tax district approved by the council is scheduled to take effect January 1, 2011, on developments within Potomac Yard and will generate about $500,000 a year in new tax revenues. The revenue from the tax district will be added to developer contributions and a soft tax increment financing area to pay bond debt financing over 30 years.

The Alexandria City Council had proposed a second tax district within Alexandria's Potomac Greens neighborhood to aid in funding the Potomac Yard station's construction cost. Residents within the proposed tax district would have been taxed (after the station opened) 10 cents per $100 of assessed property value, generating approximately $185,000 a year. Alexandria city officials removed Potomac Greens from the second tax district in May 2011.

In January 2015, the city of Alexandria was lent $50 million from the Virginia state government toward the new station, which was expected to cost between $209–264 million. In July 2016, the Northern Virginia Transportation Authority approved $66 million for the station. When the station opened, it was confirmed that the cost of construction was around $370 million.

=== Station site ===
The City of Alexandria considered four alternatives for the site of the station:

- Alternative A: At-grade, with side platforms between the CSX Transportation railroad tracks and the north end of the Potomac Greens neighborhood. Cost of $209 million.
- Alternative B: At-grade, with side platforms between the George Washington Memorial Parkway and the CSX tracks, north of Potomac Greens and east of the existing Potomac Yard Retail Center and CSX right-of-way. Cost of $268 million.
- Alternative B-CSX: At the site of the Regal Cinemas Potomac Yard movie theater. Cost of $351 million.
- Alternative D: Elevated, with a center platform west of the CSX right-of-way, near the existing Potomac Yard retail center. Cost of $493 million.

In April 2015, the city recommended Alternative B because it was the option that would result in the densest development. The City Council voted on the selection in May. As part of building the station, the city will receive 0.16 acres (650 m^{2}) of land along the George Washington Memorial Parkway from the National Park Service and, in exchange, transfer 13.56 acres (5.49 ha) of city parkland to the federal government and spend $12 million to improve the Mount Vernon Trail and Daingerfield Island. The station will have two pedestrian bridges over CSX tracks to the future development and one pedestrian bridge to Potomac Greens and Old Town Greens. Funding will come from a local tax district, tax revenue from new development, $69 million from the Northern Virginia Transportation Authority, and $50 million from a developer.

=== Finalized plans ===
The Potomac Yard project planners had completed scoping and alternatives in 2011 and were to have completed a draft environmental impact statement (DEIS) by the end of 2013. Due to delays, the final EIS was not released until June 2016. The station, as planned initially, was supposed to open by 2016, but by January 2015 it was delayed until 2018. In November 2016 the National Park Service and Federal Highway Administration issued a Record of Decision in favor of the station's construction. The WMATA board accepted the station into the system and endorsed the site choice in December 2015, with a planned opening in 2020.

In August 2017, the station was expected to be open in 2021. In April 2018, city officials in Alexandria said the station opening might be as late as 2022. Alexandria officials also raised the total cost of the station by $52 million, citing higher costs for labor and building materials. Because of this cost increase, the Potomac Yard station's proposed southern entrance at Glebe Road was canceled. However, after the construction of Amazon HQ2 was announced for the area in November 2018, the southern entrance was returned to the plans. It was planned to be completed in 2026 and cost an extra $50 million.

=== Construction ===
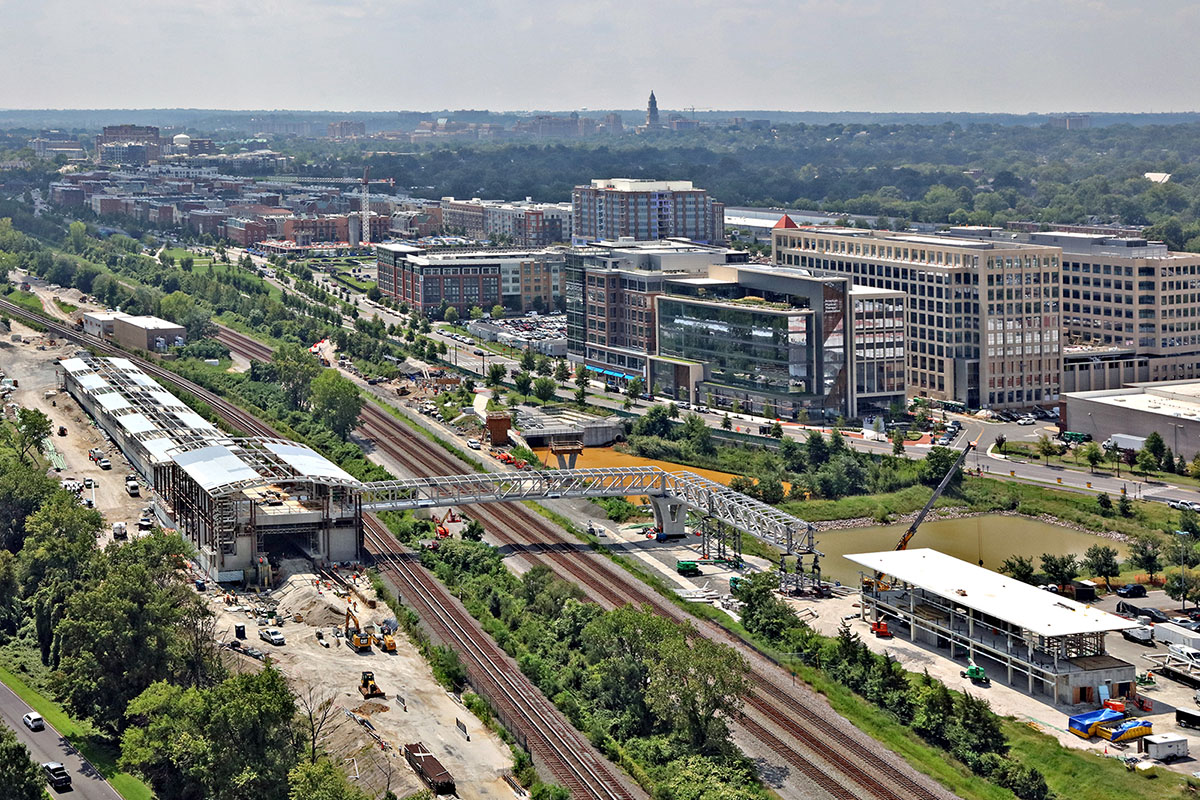
Construction progress in August 2021

The official groundbreaking ceremony was held on December 19, 2019, with completion expected for April 2022. By February 2022, construction was 70% complete, with the station expected to enter service that fall. A planned shutdown of all service to southern Yellow Line stations for maintenance work on the bridge and tunnel between the Pentagon and L'Enfant Plaza stations began on September 10, 2022, to connect Potomac Yard to the central rail system. Originally planned to end on October 22, it was extended to November 5 due to the discovery of soil conditions needing additional work. The opening of the station was also delayed to early 2023. In December 2022, with the station 90% complete, WMATA announced plans to open it in May 2023. In March 2023, WMATA revealed the artwork for the station by artist Rob Ley.

On April 19, 2023, WMATA and Alexandria announced that the station would open on May 19, 2023. The station opened at 5 a.m. that day, with "regional, state, and federal officials" attending an opening ceremony at 10:30 a.m. It was the Washington Metro's second infill station, after NoMa–Gallaudet U station on the Red Line.
