= Ronald Reagan Washington National Airport station =

Washington Metro station in Virginia, US

Ronald Reagan Washington National Airport
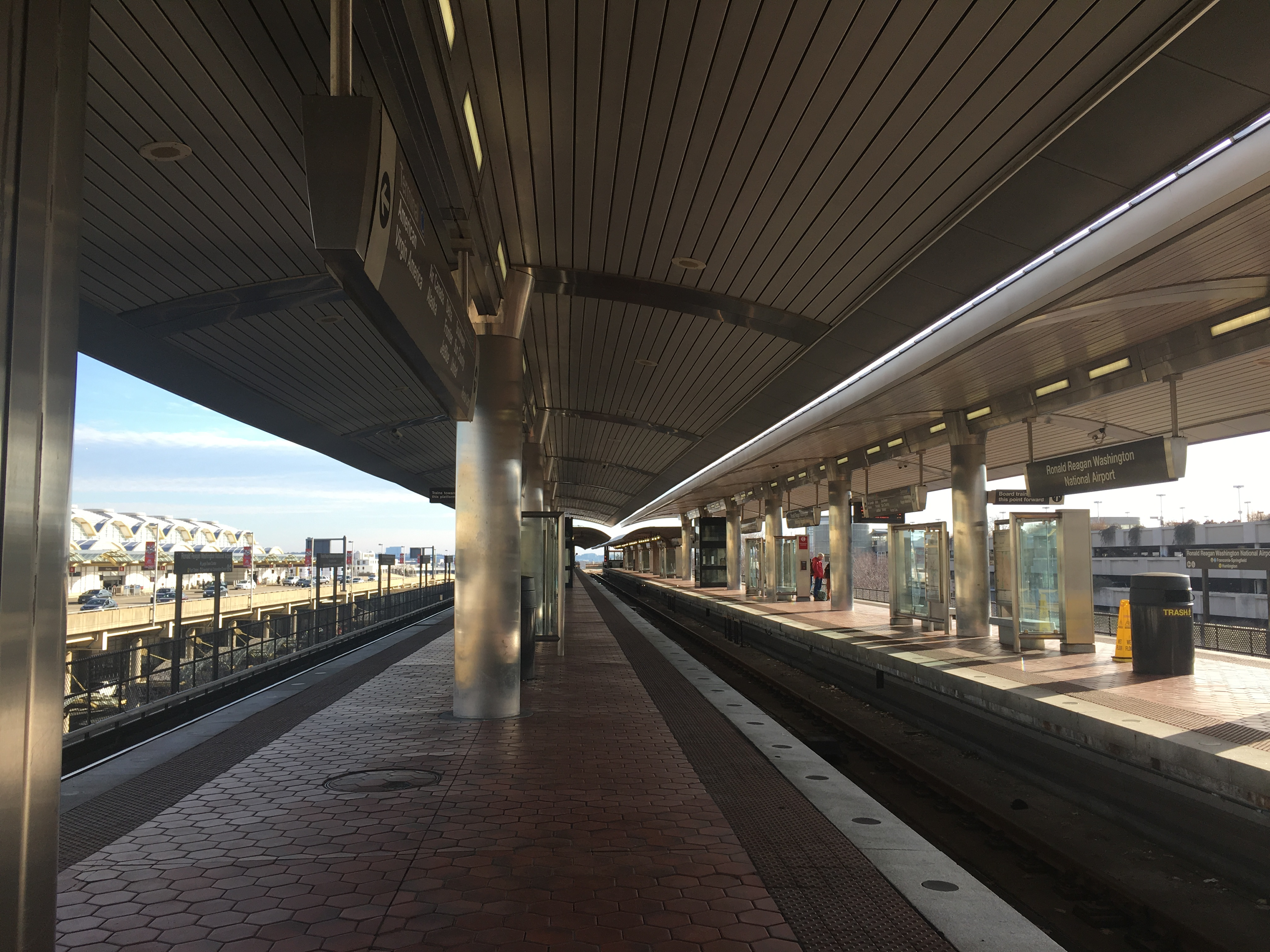
- Ronald Reagan Washington National Airport station platform in January 2017

General information
- Location: 2400 South Smith Boulevard; Arlington County, Virginia, U.S.
- Coordinates: 38.852985°N 77.0439°W
- Owner: Washington Metropolitan Area Transit Authority
- Platforms: 2 island platforms
- Tracks: 3 (2 in regular service)

Construction
- Structure type: Elevated
- Parking: Paid parking nearby
- Cycle facilities: Capital Bikeshare, 8 racks, lockers
- Accessible: Yes

Other information
- Station code: C10

History
- Opened: July 1, 1977; 49 years ago
- Rebuilt: 2003–2004, 2020
- Former names: National Airport (1977–2001)

Passengers
- 2025: 5,775 (average weekday)
- Rank: 25 of 98

Services
Preceding station	Washington Metro	Following station
Potomac Yard toward Huntington	Yellow Line	Crystal City toward Mount Vernon Square or Greenbelt
Potomac Yard toward Franconia–Springfield	Blue Line	Crystal City toward Downtown Largo
Route map
Location

Ronald Reagan Washington National Airport station is a Washington Metro station in Arlington County, Virginia, United States, on the Blue and Yellow Lines. The station platform is elevated and covered and is the last above-ground station on the Yellow Line in Virginia, heading into Washington, D.C.

It is one of only two stations in the system to have three tracks; the other is West Falls Church. The station is located across Smith Boulevard from Terminal 2 at Ronald Reagan Washington National Airport; the mezzanine is directly connected to Level 2 of the terminal (security checkpoints/gates level) by two pedestrian bridges. Airport shuttle buses or a walkway connect the station and Terminal 1. The airport's Abingdon Plantation historical site is near the station.

== History ==
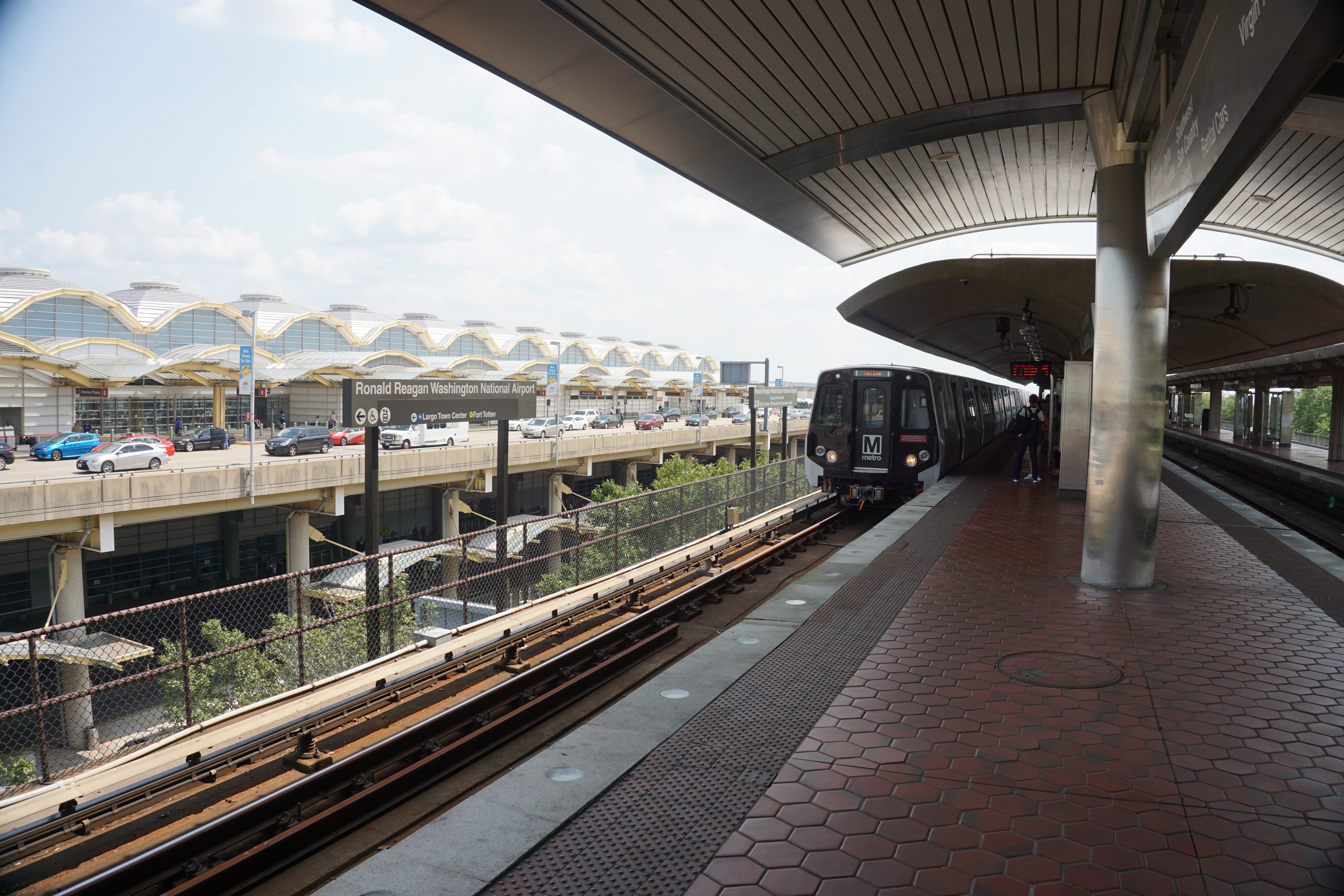
Northbound Yellow Line train at Ronald Reagan Washington National Airport in August 2018

The station opened on July 1, 1977. Its opening coincided with the completion of 11.8 miles (19.0 km) of rail between National Airport and RFK Stadium and the opening of the Arlington Cemetery, Capitol South, Crystal City, Eastern Market, Farragut West, Federal Center SW, Federal Triangle, Foggy Bottom–GWU, L'Enfant Plaza, McPherson Square, Pentagon, Pentagon City, Potomac Avenue, Rosslyn, Smithsonian, and Stadium–Armory stations.

When service began on July 1, 1977, it was the southern terminus of the Blue Line. After the Yellow Line extension to Huntington opened on December 17, 1983, the station remained the southern terminus for the Blue Line until the Van Dorn Street station opened in 1991.

During construction of a second canopy at the station, Metro began running trains through the center track even though it had not been constructed for standard operations, and on January 20, 2003, a Blue Line train derailed at the switch. No injuries resulted, but the accident delayed construction by a number of weeks. The center track was originally intended for relaying trains.

In 2014, a train was temporarily parked in the middle track while one of the elevators in the station was repaired, creating a "train bridge" to allow passengers to walk through the train to transfer between directions.

In May 2018, Metro announced an extensive renovation of platforms at twenty stations across the system. The Ronald Reagan Washington National Airport station served as a temporary southern terminal for the Blue and Yellow Lines from May to September 2019, while the stations south of the National Airport station were closed. The platforms at the National Airport station itself were rebuilt from August to December 2020.

Between May 25 and September 8, 2019, all trains terminated at this station due to the first phase of WMATA's Platform Improvement Project which closed stations south of Reagan National Airport. Between September 10 until November 5, 2022, all trains also terminated at Reagan National Airport due to the Potomac Yard station tie-in, closing all stations south of the airport.

=== Renaming controversy ===
The station retained its original name after the airport was renamed in 1998 from "Washington National Airport" to "Ronald Reagan Washington National Airport". In early 2001, a letter signed by 24 members of Congress requested WMATA rename the station to conform. However, according to a Metro policy adopted in 1987, groups seeking to rename a station were required to pay the cost of replacing signs and maps. The Arlington County government, which could have made the change, demurred—the price was estimated at $400,000—and WMATA subsequently declined to rename the station on April 19, 2001. In response, Republican Congressman Bob Barr of Georgia threatened to withhold federal funding from the agency unless the station was renamed. Congress ultimately voted to require the renaming on November 30, 2001. According to then-General Manager Richard A. White, Metro paid to complete the renaming.

== Station layout ==
The station has two island platforms serving three tracks. Between 2022-2024 the escalators at this station were replaced stopping at the opposite platforms. For example the trains to Downtown Largo and Mt Vernon SQ would stop at the southbound platform in the center track and vice versa.

T Platform level	Southbound	← toward Franconia–Springfield (Potomac Yard) ← toward Huntington (Potomac Yard)
T Platform level	Island platform
T Platform level	Center track	No Regular Service
T Platform level	Island platform
T Platform level	Northbound	toward Downtown Largo (Crystal City) → toward Greenbelt (Crystal City) →
S	Street level	Exit/Entrance; fare gates, ticket machines, station manager, walkways to Terminal 2, shuttle bus and walkway to Terminal 1
