= Franconia–Springfield station =

Rail station in Virginia, US

Franconia–Springfield
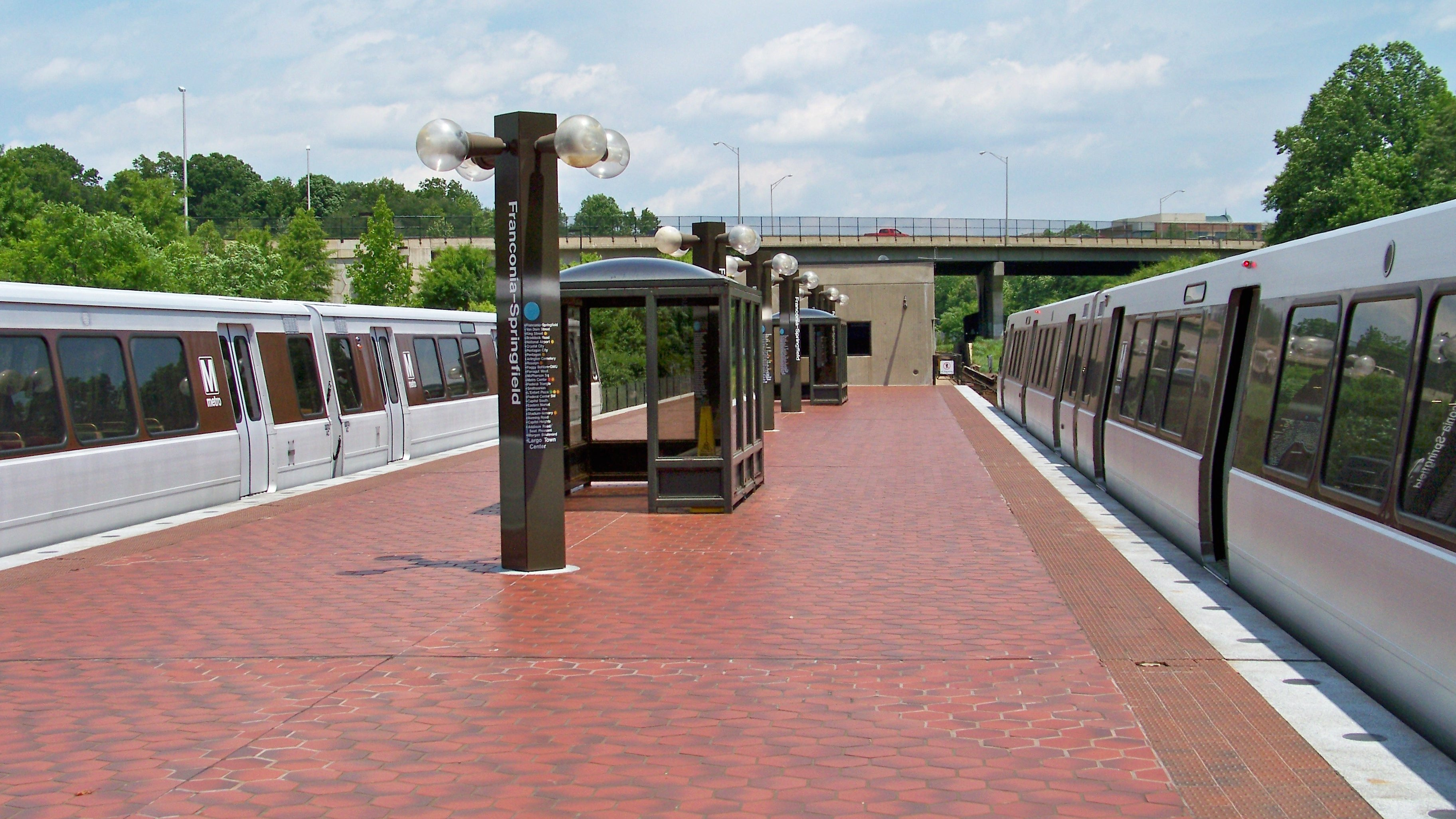
- Metro trains at Franconia–Springfield in June 2008

General information
- Location: 6880 Frontier Drive; Springfield, Virginia; United States
- Coordinates: 38°45′58″N 77°10′07″W
- Owner: Washington Metropolitan Area Transit Authority
- Line: RF&P Subdivision
- Platforms: 1 island platform (Metro); 2 side platforms (VRE)
- Tracks: 4 (2 for each service)
- Bus stands: 8
- Connections: Fairfax Connector: 231, 232, 301, 305, 308, 310, 321, 322, 334, 335, 340, 341, 350, 351, 352, 353, 371, 401, 402, 494, 670; OmniRide: Prince William Metro Express; Greyhound Lines; BestBus

Construction
- Structure type: At-grade
- Parking: 5,069 spaces
- Cycle facilities: Capital Bikeshare, 36 racks, 20 lockers
- Accessible: Yes

Other information
- Station code: J03 (WMATA)
- Fare zone: Zone 3 (VRE)

History
- Opened: 1995 (VRE); June 29, 1997 (Metro)
- Rebuilt: 2019 (Metro)

Passengers
- 2025: 3,764 (average weekday) (Metro)
- Rank: 49 of 98 (Metro)

Services
Preceding station	Virginia Railway Express	Following station
Lorton toward Spotsylvania	Fredericksburg Line	Alexandria toward Union Station
Preceding station	Washington Metro	Following station
Terminus	Blue Line	Van Dorn Street toward Downtown Largo
Former services
Preceding station	Amtrak	Following station
Quantico toward Norfolk, Newport News or Roanoke	Northeast Regional	Alexandria toward Boston South or Springfield
Preceding station	Washington Metro	Following station
Terminus	Yellow Line	Van Dorn Street toward Greenbelt
Preceding station	Richmond, Fredericksburg and Potomac Railroad	Following station
Accotin toward Richmond: Broad Street or Main Street	Main Line	Alexandria toward Washington, D.C.
Route map
Location

Franconia–Springfield station is a Washington Metro rapid transit station and Virginia Railway Express commuter rail station located in Springfield, Virginia, United States. The station is the southwestern terminus of the Metro Blue Line and an intermediate station on the VRE Fredericksburg Line. It is also a major bus terminal for Fairfax Connector buses, plus other local and intercity bus routes. The station has one island platform serving the two Metro tracks, plus two side platforms serving the RF&P Subdivision on which the Fredericksburg Line runs.

Located in a suburban area near I-95, the station is primarily used by commuters from more distant suburbs. Its parking garage is the largest on the Metro system, with 5,069 spaces. With an average of 2,491 daily riders in 2023, Franconia–Springfield was the 41st-busiest Metro station and the ninth-busiest in Virginia.

The VRE stop opened in 1995, followed by the Metro station on June 29, 1997. From 2003 to 2010, the station was also served by Amtrak Northeast Regional intercity rail trains.

== History ==
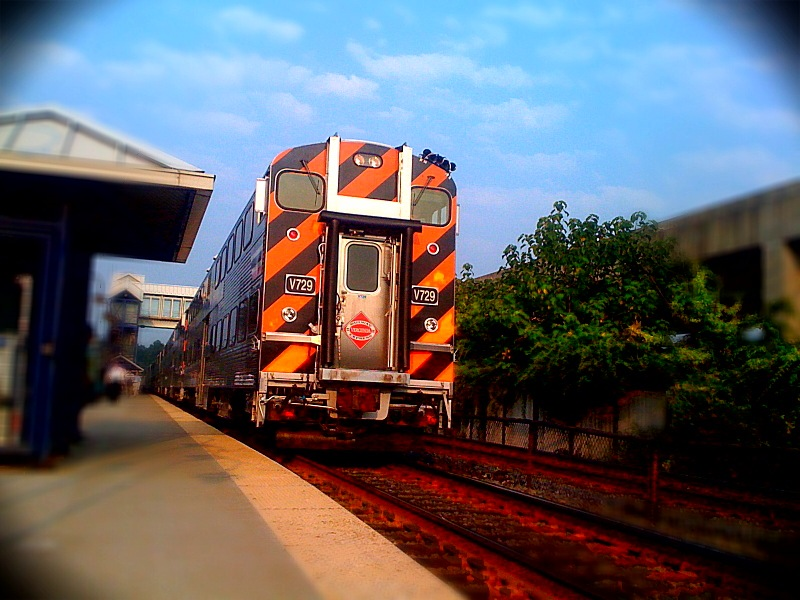
A VRE train pulling in to Franconia–Springfield VRE station

Prior to construction by WMATA, Franconia–Springfield station was the site of Franconia Station, a standard railroad station built by the Richmond, Fredericksburg and Potomac Railroad. It was built in 1870 and demolished in 1952. Original Metro plans called for separate stations for Franconia and Springfield, but before 1979 – due to the expense and complications of running separate branches – plans had changed to combine the two stations into one. In 1979 the "Franconia" station was renamed "Franconia–Springfield".

In 1981, WMATA held a series of public hearings to discuss issues related to the expansion of the then Yellow Line to Springfield by 1986, although the project was unfunded at that time. In 1983, the rail section between National Airport and Huntington via King Street–Old Town was completed. WMATA made a last-minute swap to the line assignments of the southern branches beyond King Street, originally Yellow for Franconia–Springfield and Blue for Huntington, to save on required railcars due to a serious railcar shortage at the time. Subsequently, the new track section was served by the Yellow Line instead of the Blue Line at its opening, while the Blue Line ended at National Airport until 1991, when the only intermediate station on the Franconia–Springfield branch (Van Dorn Street station) opened and it was extended to terminate there. Initially intended to be a temporary arrangement, the change was never reversed. By 1987, the Northern Virginia Transportation Commission began to evaluate whether or not state funding would be necessary to complete the station as federal funding was not guaranteed at that time. By 1991, funding for the expansion was secured and plans for the station, parking garage, and other commuter facilities were approved by the Metro board.

The VRE platform opened in 1995, the second infill station on the system. The Metrorail station opened on June 29, 1997; its opening coincided with the completion of 3.3 miles (5.3 km) of rail west of the Van Dorn Street station. The final cost for both the station and rail expansion was $175 million ($326 million in 2025).

On October 10, 2003, due to increases in ridership on both the Metro and VRE lines, WMATA opened an additional parking garage on the premises for park-and-ride users, offering an additional 1,000 parking spaces, and bringing the total to 5,100 spaces.

On June 25, 2017, Yellow Line trains stopped serving the station due to the elimination of Rush+, which is part of major changes to the Metrorail system.

In May 2018, Metro announced an extensive renovation of platforms at twenty stations across the system. The Blue and Yellow Lines south of Ronald Reagan Washington National Airport station, including the Franconia–Springfield station, would be closed from May to September 2019.

Between September 10 and November 5, 2022, Franconia–Springfield was closed due to the Potomac Yard station tie-in, closing all stations south of Ronald Reagan Washington National Airport station. Shuttle buses were provided throughout the shutdown.

== Station layout ==
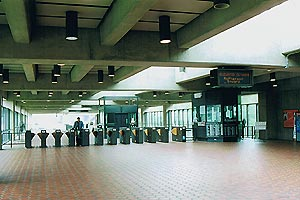
The station's mezzanine

Access to the station is provided by an elevated walkway connecting the parking garage and bus bays to the platforms. Blue Line trains stop at an island platform below the elevated walkway, with fare control on the same level as the walkway. VRE trains stop at two side platforms adjacent to the Metro tracks.
