= Yellow Line (Washington Metro) =

Washington Metro rapid transit line

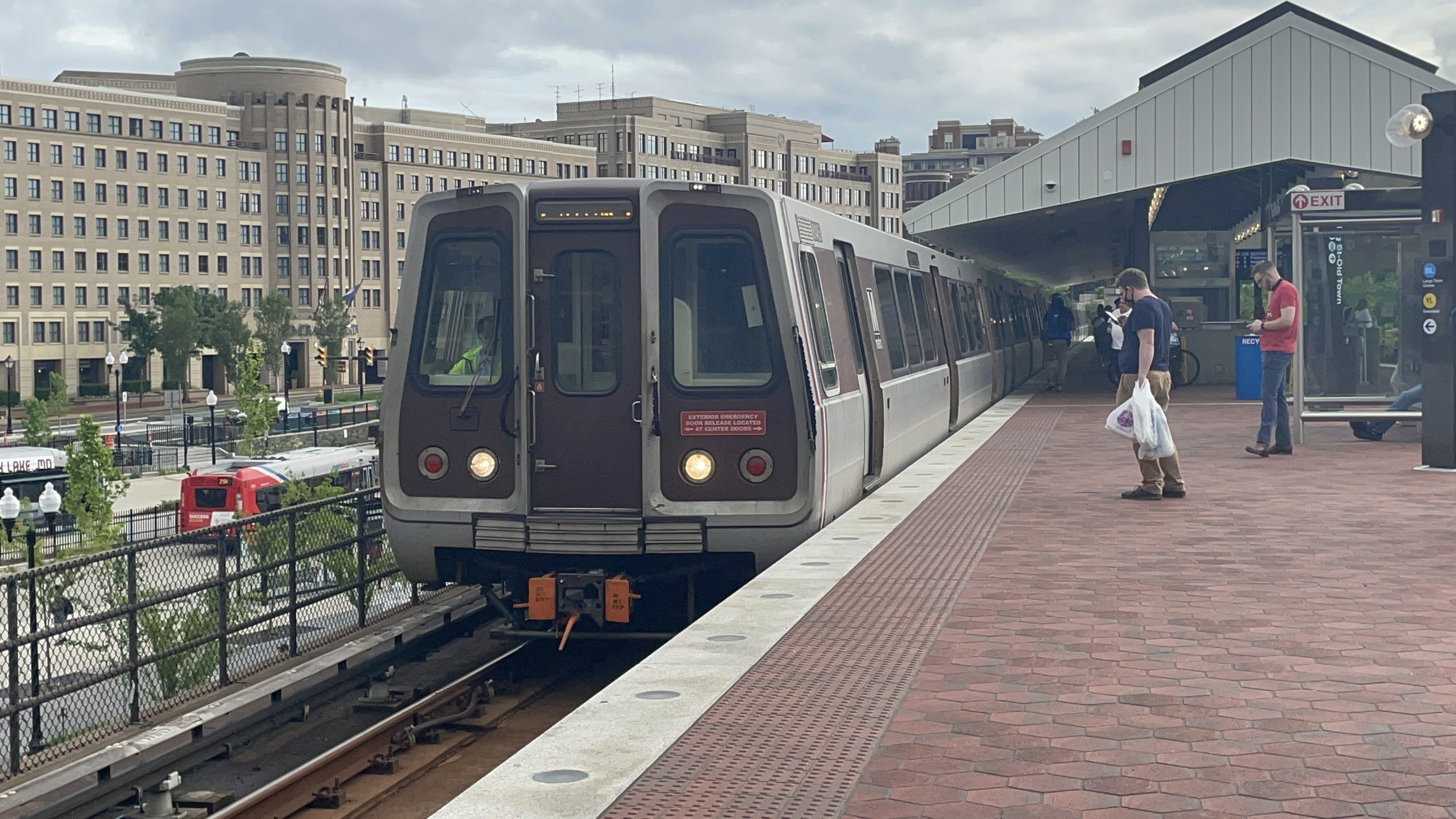
- Northbound Yellow Line train arriving at King Street–Old Town in May 2022

Overview
- Locale: Fairfax, Alexandria, and Arlington counties, Virginia; Washington, D.C. Prince George's County, Maryland
- Termini: Huntington; Mount Vernon Square Greenbelt
- Stations: 22

Service
- Type: Rapid transit
- System: Washington Metro
- Operator: WMATA
- Rolling stock: 3000-series, 6000-series, 7000-series

History
- Opened: April 30, 1983

Technical
- Number of tracks: 2
- Character: At-grade, elevated, and underground
- Track gauge: 4 ft 8 1/4 in (1,429 mm)
- Electrification: Third rail, 750 V DC
Route map
Yellow Line highlighted in yellow

The Yellow Line is a rapid transit line of the Washington Metro system that runs between Huntington in Virginia and Mount Vernon Square in Washington, D.C. or Greenbelt in Maryland. It consists of 22 stations in Fairfax County, the city of Alexandria, Arlington County in Virginia, Washington, D.C., and Prince George's County, Maryland. (Note: Peak hours are 5 a.m. to 9:30 a.m. and 3 p.m. to 7 p.m.)

The Yellow Line shares track with the Blue Line between King Street–Old Town and Pentagon and the Green Line between L'Enfant Plaza and Greenbelt. It has only two stations that are not shared by any other lines (Huntington and Eisenhower Avenue) and only two sections of track that are not shared by any other lines – the section south of King Street–Old Town and the section between Pentagon and L'Enfant Plaza, crossing the Potomac River.

On weekdays, trains run every 6 minutes until 9:30PM and every 7.5 minutes afterward. On weekends, trains run every 8 minutes.

== History ==
Planning for Metro began with the Mass Transportation Survey in 1955, which attempted to forecast freeway and mass transit systems sufficient to meet the region's needs projected for 1980. In 1959, the study's final report included two rapid transit lines that anticipated downtown Washington subways. Because the plan called for extensive freeway construction within the District of Columbia, alarmed residents lobbied for federal legislation creating a regional transportation agency with a moratorium on freeway construction through July 1, 1962. The new agency, the National Capital Transportation Administration, issued a 1962 Transportation in the National Capital Region report, which did not include the route that became the Yellow Line. A central route under 7th Street in downtown was only added in 1967 primarily to serve the "inner city". In March 1968, the Washington Metropolitan Area Transit Authority (WMATA) board approved its 98-mile (158 km) Adopted Regional System (ARS), which included the Yellow Line from Franconia and Backlick Road (in Springfield) to Greenbelt.

While a cut-and-fill tunnel for Yellow Line was built under 7th Street and U Street, street traffic and pedestrian access were difficult. The result was the loss of the traditional retail businesses along the route. The downtown segment of the line was originally projected to open in September 1977. Obtaining approval of the District of Columbia and Prince George's County of the exact alignment of the Yellow Line north of U Street delayed construction. Originally, the ARS called for the line to be placed in the median strip of the planned North Central Freeway,. Still, after that road was canceled, the route of the replacement subway tunnel became controversial, resulting in years of expensive delays.

Service on the Yellow Line began on April 30, 1983, adding Archives to the system and linking the two already-built stations of Pentagon and Gallery Place with a bridge across the Potomac River. It was extended beyond National Airport by four stations to Huntington on December 17, 1983, the first station outside the Capital Beltway. When the Green Line link to U Street opened on May 11, 1991, it acted as an extension of the Yellow Line until the southern Green Line branch was completed. When Green Line service began, the Yellow Line was truncated at Mount Vernon Square, where a pocket track exists to relay trains.

The Yellow Line was initially planned to follow a slightly different route in Virginia. The plan would have sent Yellow Line trains to Franconia–Springfield, with Blue Line trains serving Huntington. This was changed due to a shortage of rail cars at the time of the completion of the line to Huntington. Because fewer rail cars were required to operate Yellow Line service than would be required to run Blue Line service out to Huntington, the line designations were switched due to the Yellow Line's shorter route. From 1999 to 2008, the Yellow Line operated to Franconia–Springfield on July 4, as part of Metro's special service pattern on that day.

On November 16, 1995, WMATA and the developer of the Potomac Yard area of Alexandria, Virginia, signed an agreement to construct Potomac Yard station between Braddock Road and National Airport.

=== 21st century ===
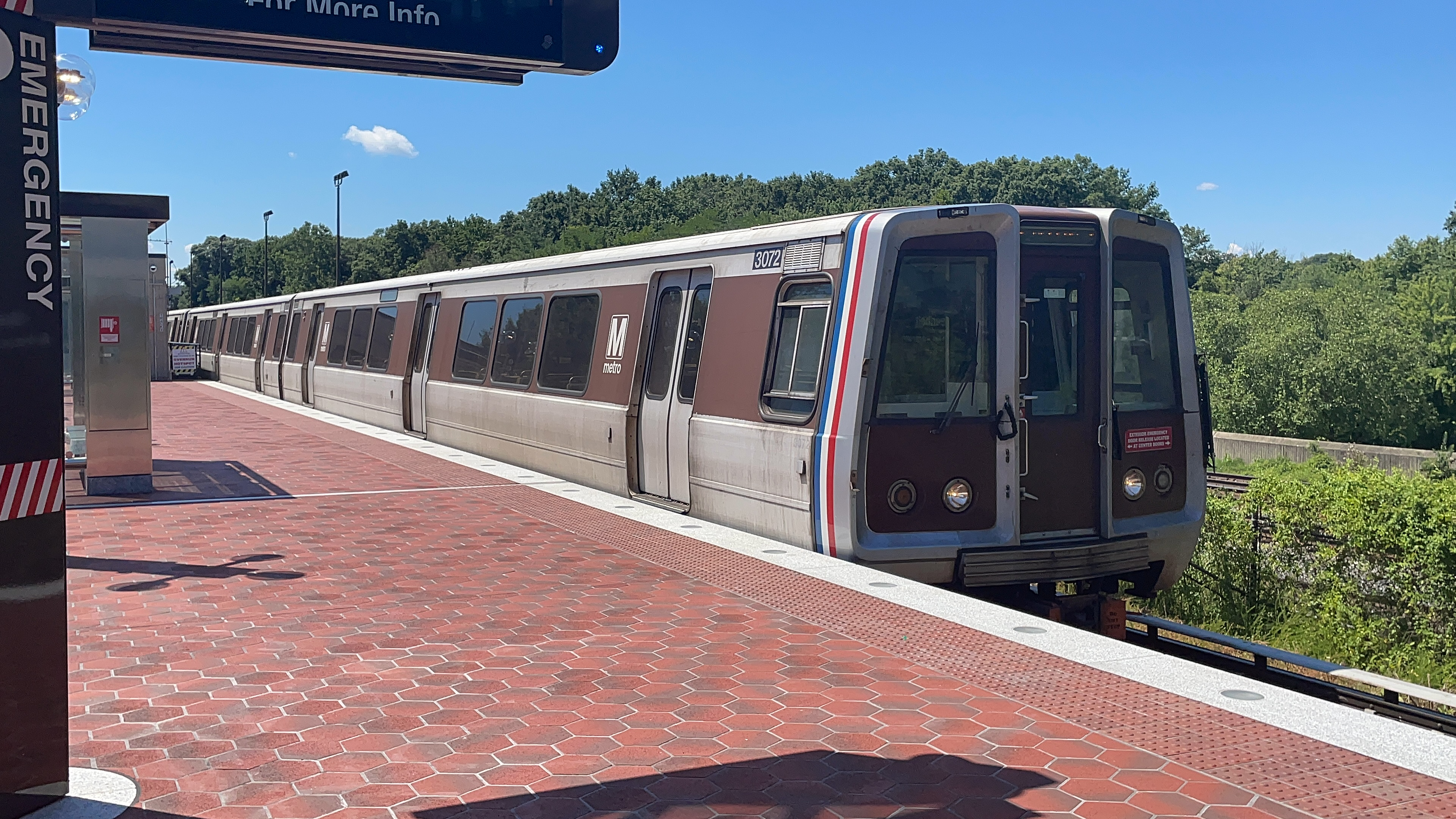
Yellow Line train arriving at Greenbelt in August 2022

In 2006, Metro board member Jim Graham and Washington, D.C. Mayor Anthony A. Williams proposed re-extending Yellow Line service to Fort Totten or even Greenbelt. Their proposal did not involve constructing any new track because either extension would run along the same route as the existing Green Line, thus relieving crowding on that line and would require fewer switches to maintain making operations easier. Suburban members of the board initially resisted the proposal. Through a compromise that also increased service on the Red Line, on April 20, 2006, the WMATA board approved a Yellow Line extension to the Fort Totten station during off-peak hours. An 18-month pilot program began on December 31, 2006, at a cost of $5.75 million to the District of Columbia. On June 26, 2008, due to the success of the 18-month trial, the Yellow Line was permanently extended to Fort Totten at all times except peak hours.

As part of the Rush Plus initiative trial, additional Yellow Line trains began running between Greenbelt and Franconia-Springfield starting June 18, 2012; these trains were discontinued on June 25, 2017, due to budget cuts. To accommodate platform reconstructions, the Blue and Yellow Lines south of Ronald Reagan Washington National Airport were closed from May 25 to September 8, 2019, in the longest line closure in Metro's history. The Yellow Line was extended to Greenbelt at the beginning of the closure and retained after. On May 7, 2023, Yellow Line trains were shortened to Mount Vernon Square at all times being replaced by additional Green Line trains.

From March 26, 2020, until June 28, 2020, trains bypassed Eisenhower Avenue, Archives, Mount Vernon Square, and College Park–University of Maryland stations due to the COVID-19 pandemic. All stations were reopened beginning on June 28, 2020. Between February 13 and May 13, 2021, additional Yellow Line trains began operating between Mount Vernon Square and Franconia–Springfield at all times, replacing the Blue Line due to it being suspended because of platform reconstruction at Arlington Cemetery and Addison Road. Between May 29 and September 6, 2021, all Yellow Line trains terminated at Mount Vernon Square due to a platform improvement project which closed stations north of Fort Totten.

Yellow Line trains were suspended beginning September 10, 2022, to tie in Potomac Yard station and to rehabilitate the 14th Street Bridge that the Yellow Line operates over. Service was replaced by additional Green Line trains, as well as Blue Line trains that operated between Huntington and New Carrollton stations. The Yellow Line reopened on May 7, 2023, with its northeastern terminus cut back from Greenbelt to Mount Vernon Square. Potomac Yard station opened on May 19, 2023. Automatic train operation on the Yellow and Green lines, which had ceased following the 2009 Red Line train collision, was allowed to resume in May 2025. Effective December 31, 2025, half of all Yellow Line trains have been re-extended to Greenbelt.

== Route ==
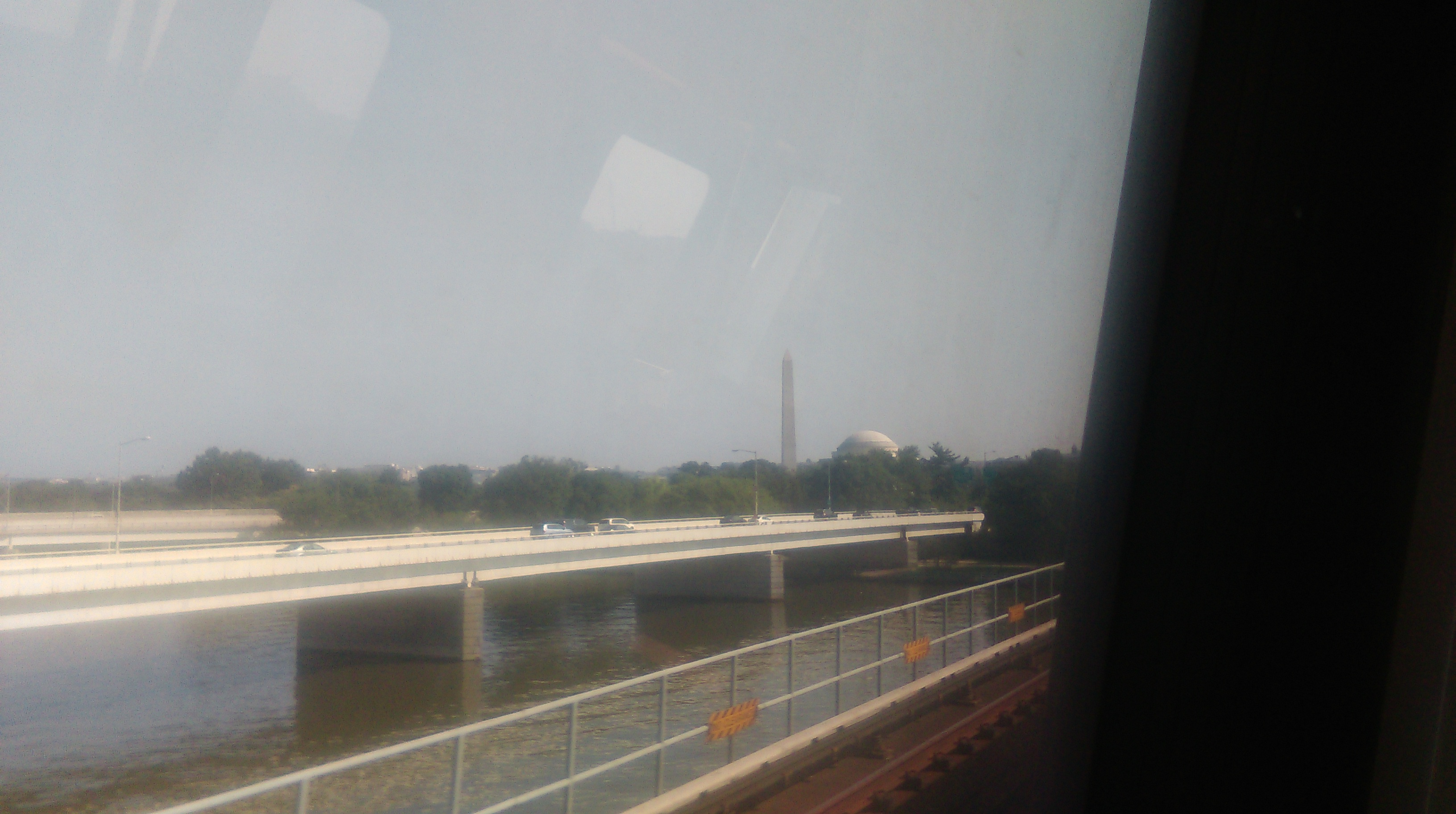
Crossing the Potomac River from Northern Virginia on the Yellow Line with the Washington Monument and Jefferson Memorial in the background

The southern terminus of the Yellow Line is adjacent to Kings Highway (Virginia State Route 241) in Fairfax County, Virginia. The line heads northeast on a bridge over Hunting Creek and the Capital Beltway to a station just south of Eisenhower Avenue, which serves several government office buildings, including the United States Patent and Trademark Office. The Yellow Line then merges with the Blue Line and follows the right-of-way of the RF&P Railroad through the City of Alexandria. The line enters a short tunnel under U.S. Route 1. After crossing a bridge over Four Mile Run, the line enters Arlington County on an elevated structure above the National Airport parking lots.

At the north end of the airport, the Yellow Line enters a tunnel under 18th Street South and South Hayes Street in Crystal City. The tunnel continues along the southwest face of the Pentagon which is a 2-level station to facilitate a fork with the Blue Line. After the Pentagon station, the Yellow Line emerges from its tunnel east of the Pentagon and crosses the Charles R. Fenwick Bridge over the George Washington Memorial Parkway, the Potomac River, and Ohio Drive. At the end of the bridge, the Yellow Line re-enters a tunnel near the Jefferson Memorial and crosses under the Washington Channel. The tunnel merges with the Green Line tunnel under 7th Street Southwest just south of the L'Enfant Plaza. The joint Yellow—Green Line tunnel continues north through downtown Washington under 7th Street, turns west under Florida Avenue and U Street, and then north under 14th Street Northwest. The tunnel then turns toward the northeast under Park Road and New Hampshire Avenue. The tunnel then bends eastward under Rock Creek Cemetery and Fort Totten Park to emerge just before entering the lower level of the Fort Totten station. Until May 2019, this was the northern terminal for Yellow Line service, with the track continuing northeast as just the Green Line to the Greenbelt terminus. Between May 2019 and September 2022, and again beginning in December 2025, the Yellow Line continued along these tracks to Greenbelt.

Internally, the Yellow Line in Virginia is called the "Huntington Route" (C) and the route through the District of Columbia and beyond to Greenbelt as the "Greenbelt Route" (E). The line's bridge over the Potomac River is called the L Route. As of March 2018, all Yellow Line trains were required only to run 8-car trains. However Yellow Line trains began operating 6-car trains again in summer 2019, and full time by September 2022.

== Stations ==
The following stations are along the line, from south to north.

Station	Code	Location	Opened	Image	Rail connections	Bus connections
Huntington	C15	Fairfax County, VA	December 17, 1983		—N/a	Metrobus: A11, F1X; Fairfax Connector: 101, 109, 151, 152, 159, 161, 162, 171, 301, 310
Eisenhower Avenue	C14	Alexandria, VA	December 17, 1983		—N/a	Metrobus: F1X, P90; DASH: 32
King Street–Old Town	C13	Alexandria, VA	December 17, 1983		Blue Line; Amtrak (at Alexandria Union Station); Virginia Railway Express (at Alexandria Union Station)	Metrobus: A71, F1X, F20, F23, F24, P90; DASH: 30, 31, 32, 33, 102, King Street Trolley
Braddock Road	C12	Alexandria, VA	December 17, 1983		Blue Line	Metrobus: A11, A12, A1X; DASH: 30, 31, 34, 103, 104
Potomac Yard	C11	Alexandria, VA	May 19, 2023		Blue Line	Metrobus: A1X, A70; DASH: 33, 34, 36A/B
Ronald Reagan Washington; National Airport	C10	Arlington County, VA	July 1, 1977		Blue Line	—N/a
Crystal City	C09	Arlington County, VA	July 1, 1977		Blue Line; Virginia Railway Express (at Crystal City VRE)	Metrobus: A11, A1X, A40; ART: 43; Fairfax Connector: 598, 599
Pentagon City	C08	Arlington County, VA	July 1, 1977		Blue Line	Metrobus: A11, A1X, A27, A40, A66, F44; ART: 42, 74, 84, 87; Fairfax Connector: 598, 599
Pentagon	C07	Arlington County, VA	July 1, 1977		Blue Line	Metrobus: A11, A25, A27, A28, A66, A90, F28, F44, F81, F83, F85; ART: 42, 87, 87X; Fairfax Connector: 306, 393, 394, 395, 396, 598, 599, 698, 834, 835
L'Enfant Plaza	F03	Washington D.C.	July 1, 1977		Green Line; Orange Line; Silver Line; Blue Line; Virginia Railway Express (at L'Enfant)	Metrobus: A40, C11, C55, D30, D40, D50, D60
Archives	F02	Washington D.C.	April 30, 1983		Green Line	Metrobus: D10, D1X, D24, D30, D40, D4X, D60
Gallery Place	F01	Washington D.C.	December 15, 1976		Red Line; Green Line	Metrobus: D20, D24, D2X, D30, D34, D35, D40, D4X, D80, D94
Mount Vernon Square	E01	Washington D.C.	May 11, 1991		Green Line	Metrobus: D40, D4X
Shaw–Howard University	E02	Washington D.C.	May 11, 1991		Green Line	Metrobus: D32, D40, D4X
U Street	E03	Washington D.C.	May 11, 1991		Green Line	Metrobus: C51, C53, C57, D44, D50, D5X
Columbia Heights	E04	Washington D.C.	September 18, 1999		Green Line	Metrobus: C61, D50, D5X, D60, D6X, D74
Georgia Avenue–Petworth	E05	Washington D.C.	September 18, 1999		Green Line	Metrobus: C63, C75, D40, D44, D4X, D74
Fort Totten	E06	Washington D.C.	December 11, 1993		Red Line; Green Line	Metrobus: C71, C77, C81, D30, D44, M60, M6X, P16, P16, P32, P35
West Hyattsville	E07	Prince George's County, MD	December 11, 1993		Green Line	Metrobus: C41, D34, P32, P33
Hyattsville Crossing (Note: Originally called Prince George’s Plaza; renamed in 2022)	E08	Prince George's County, MD	December 11, 1993		Green Line	Metrobus: M12, M44, P10, P30, P32, P35; GoPGC: P43
College Park–University of Maryland	E09	Prince George's County, MD	December 11, 1993		Green Line; MARC: Camden Line; Purple Line (under construction)	Metrobus: M42, P10, P14, P31; GoPGC: P37
Greenbelt	E10	Prince George's County, MD	December 11, 1993		Green Line; MARC: Camden Line	Metrobus: P12, P14, P20, P21, P32; GoPGC: P19, P22, P2X; RTA: 302

== Future ==
A July 2005 study proposed connecting the eastern mezzanine of Metro Center with the western mezzanine of Gallery Place, which are only one block apart, with a pedestrian tunnel. The proposed connection would reduce the number of passengers that use the Red Line to transfer between the Yellow Line and the Blue and Orange lines at Metro Center. As of 2011, the project remained unfunded.

In 2013 and 2014, the Virginia Department of Rail and Public Transportation conducted a study on future transit improvements from Huntington station to Woodbridge. The study, finalized in 2015, recommended a bus rapid transit (BRT) route along U.S. Route 1 in the short term with an eventual extension of the Yellow Line three miles south to Hybla Valley in the long term. Fairfax County's Board of Supervisors voted to widen Richmond Highway and construct the BRT line in 2018. Fairfax County states that the primary goal of the BRT route is to increase transit ridership in the area to support the future Yellow Line extension to Hybla Valley.

== See also ==
- List of Washington Metro stations
