= Eisenhower East and Carlyle =

Neighborhood of Alexandria, Virginia

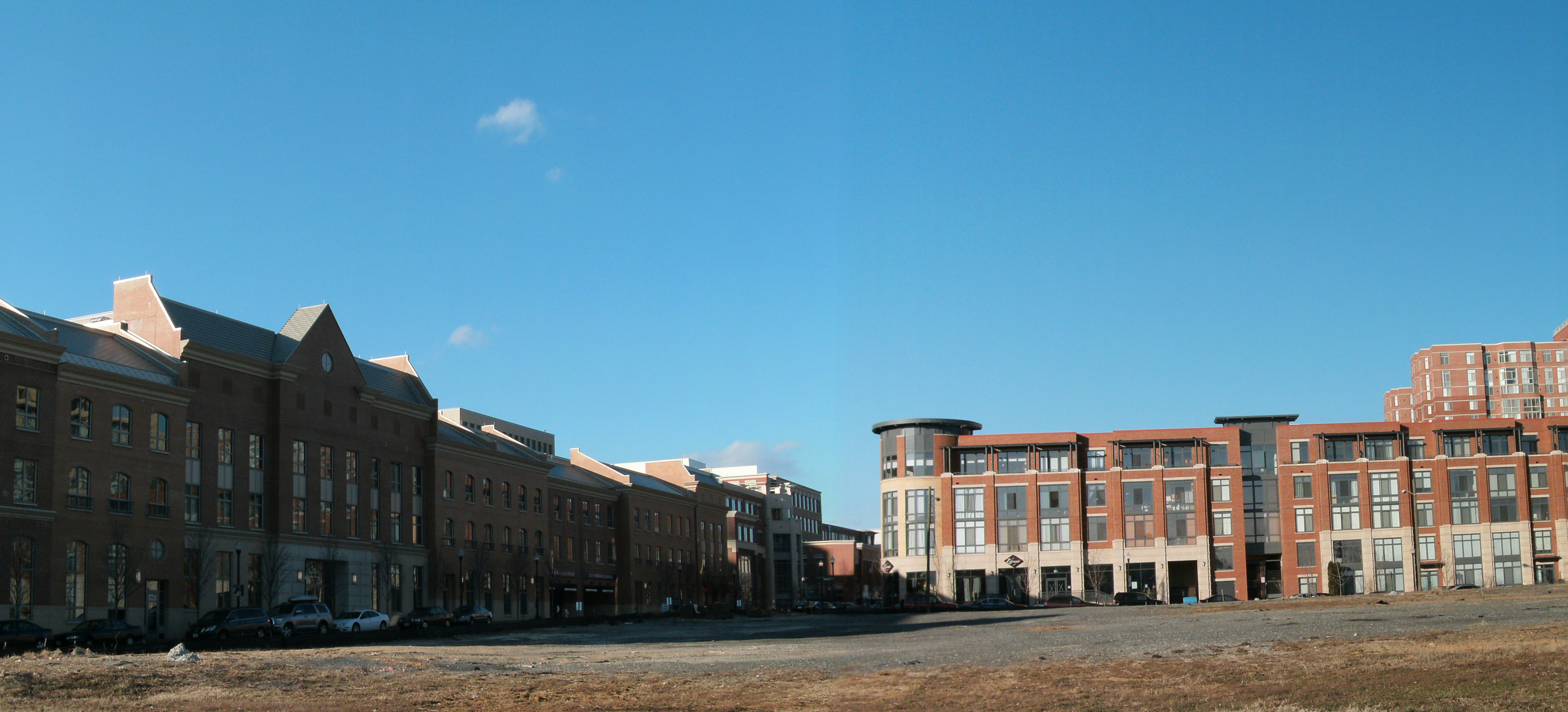
The Carlyle neighborhood seen under construction in 2009

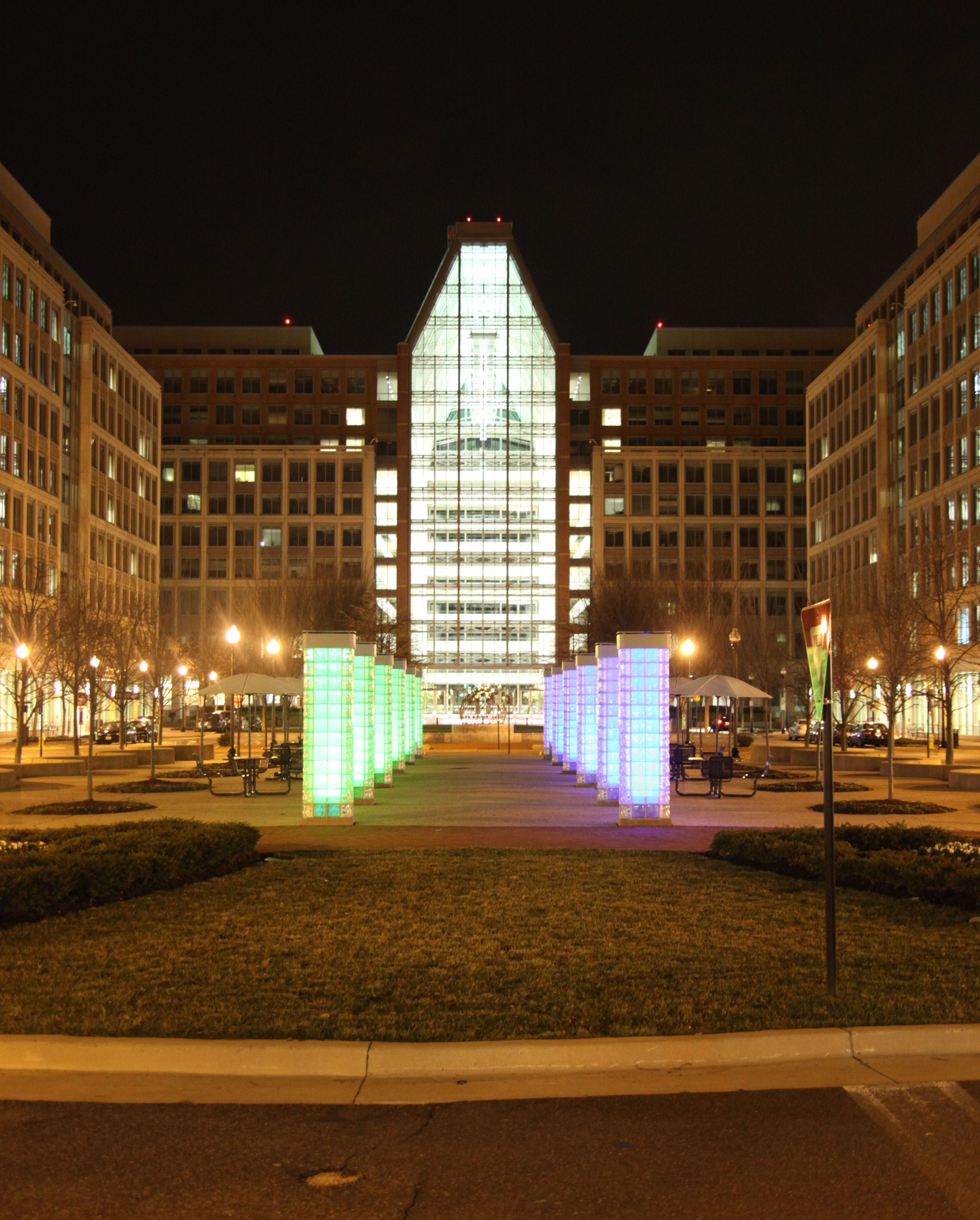
United States Patent and Trademark Office in Carlyle

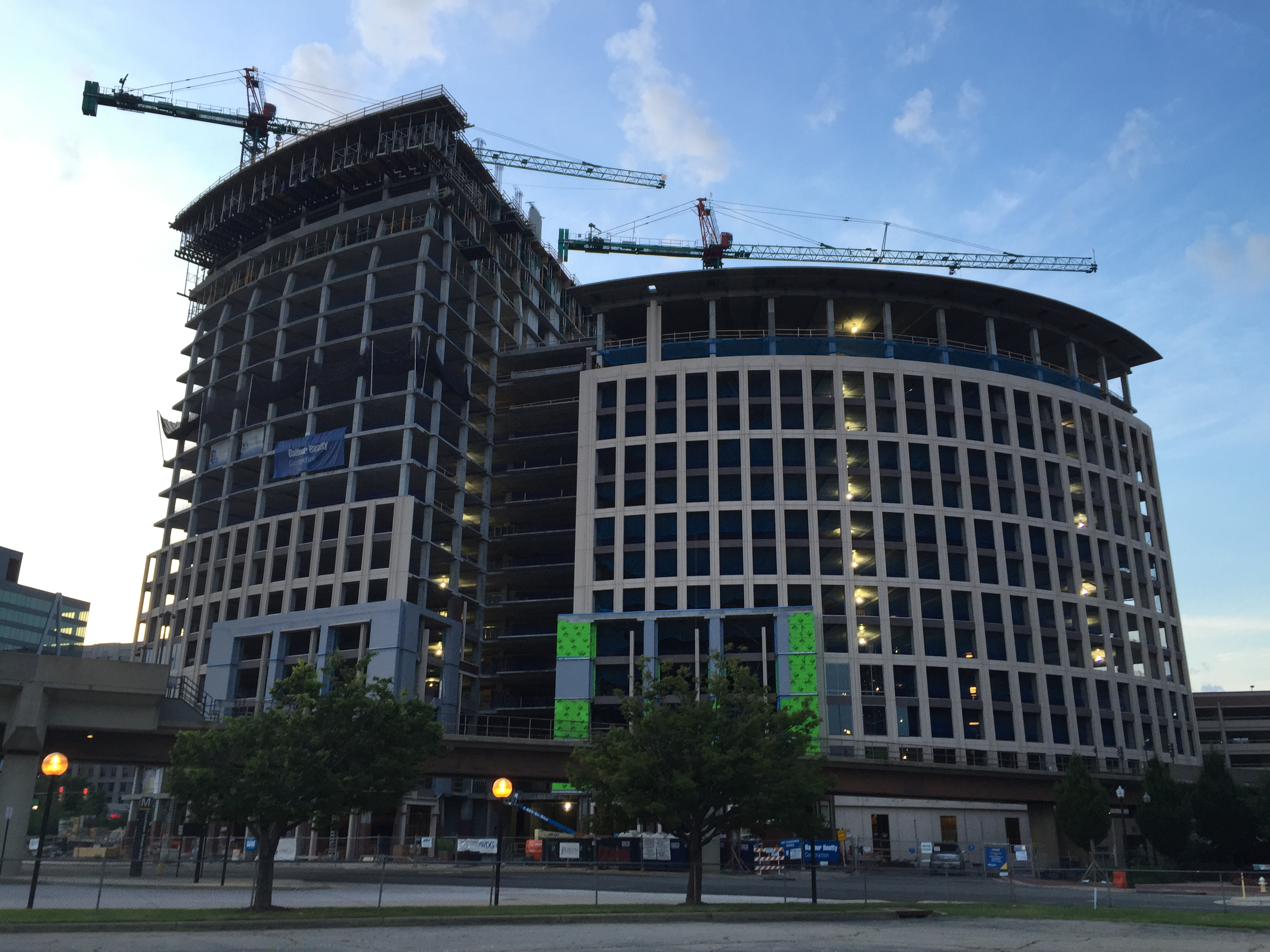
National Science Foundation building under construction in 2015

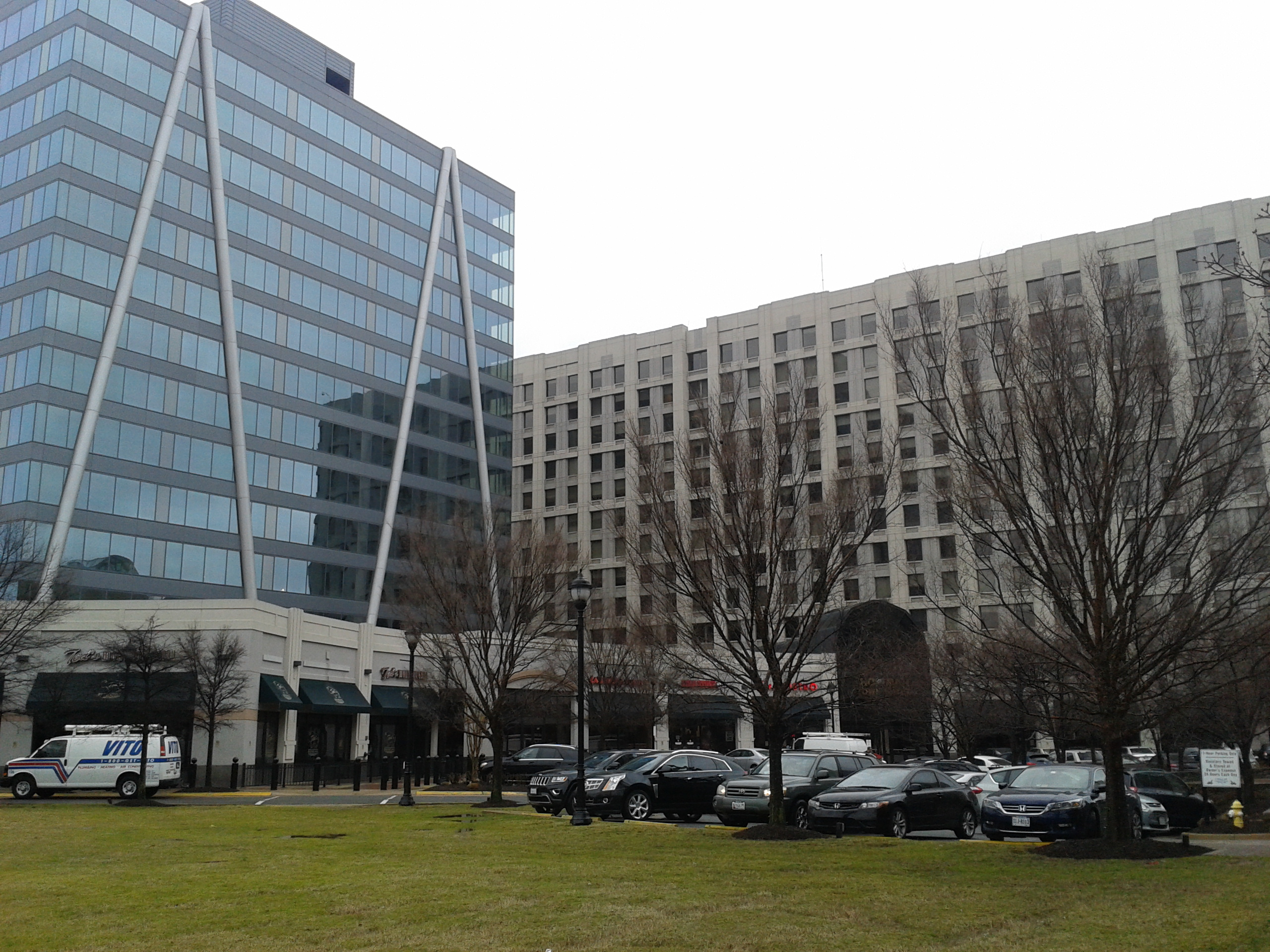
Hoffman Town Center in 2015. At left, the former Hoffman Center I, now the Carlyle Tower. At right, the former Hoffman Tower II, now the Foundry.

Eisenhower East and Carlyle together form one of the most important commercial and high-density residential neighborhoods of Alexandria, Virginia, the location of many mixed-use developments, office buildings, and hotels. Carlyle is contiguous with Eisenhower East, and is included in the same Eisenhower East Master Plan.

== Eisenhower East / Hoffman Center area ==
The Hoffman Center, with around 1,000,000 sq ft (93,000 m^{2}) of office space, was constructed between 1968 and 1972 Now a much larger complex known as the Hoffman Town Center, it includes:

- The new home of the U.S. National Science Foundation, opened in 2017, with about 2,100 employees
- The AMC Hoffman Town Center cinema multiplex. The northern edge of the AMC building was the location of the burial vault of one of the founding families of Alexandria, the West family.
- The Carlyle Tower, formerly named the Hoffman Tower I, 15 stories, built 2012–4, 348,000 sq ft (32,300 m^{2}) offices
- The Foundry, formerly renovated and now containing 520 residential units and 20,000 sq ft (1,900 m^{2}) of retail Formerly known as "Hoffman Tower II", a 606,575 sq ft (56,352.7 m^{2}) office tower owned by the U.S. General Services Administration and long occupied by the U.S. Department of Defense
  - The Shops at Carlyle Tower, with several restaurants including Ted's Montana Grill and other businesses which started opening in 2023
- A multi-story, 2,800-vehicle parking garage

Immediately to the north of Hoffman Town Center is Carlyle Crossing, including 210,000 sq ft (20,000 m^{2}) of retail anchored by an 81,000 sq ft (7,500 m^{2}) Wegmans supermarket.

Other developments in the area are:

- Washington Metropolitan Area Transit Authority (WMATA) Integrated Command and Communications Center (MICC), opened 2023, 14 stories, 1400 employees. The MICC is the system's technology hub, including the data center, cybersecurity operations, bus and rail video teams, communications, and administrative support.
- Holiday Inn hotel, SW corner, Eisenhower Avenue and Stovall Street
- Parc Meridian at Eisenhower Station apartment building (750 Port Street, 24 stories)
- Carlyle Place apartments (2251 Eisenhower Avenue, two towers, completed 2007, Collis and Kronstadt, architects)
- Meridian 2250 apartments (2250 Dock Lane, 26 stories, under construction as of April 2024)

There are plans under discussion as of June 2024 to continue development of the remaining blocks currently serving as surface parking lots.

Former plans that did not come to fruition include a tower at the southwest corner of Eisenhower and Port which would have become, when completed, the tallest inside the Capital Beltway.

== Carlyle ==
Carlyle is home to the United States Patent and Trademark Office with about 12,000 employees, the National Inventors Hall of Fame, and the Albert V. Bryan U.S. Courthouse,

=== Eisenhower Statue ===
At the east end of Carlyle at Eisenhower Avenue at Holland Drive, stood from 2004 to 2020 a statue of the former president in his army uniform by artist Michael Curtis, erected to mark the official starting point of the national expressway system championed by Eisenhower as president. It stood at the center of a traffic circle which has since been changed to a regular T-intersection.

== Parks ==
=== Alexandria African American Heritage Park ===
The Alexandria African American Heritage Park, donated to the city by Norfolk Southern in 1995, is located in the Eisenhower Valley, at the foot of the adjacent Wilkes Street Cemetery Complex. The 7.6-acre park is a satellite of the Alexandria Black History Museum, and was designed by landscape architectural firm EDAW. It contains sculptures by Jerome Meadows, a Washington, D.C.-based artist. The focal point of the park is a group of bronze trees titled Truths That Rise From the Roots Remembered, and other sculptures around the site further commemorate Alexandria's black history. Included in the park are the remains of the Black Baptist Cemetery, which had been established in 1885 but was later abandoned; 28 burials on the site are known, and six headstones have been reerected as memorials to those buried there. A wetland area provides a home for a variety of wildlife.

Hooff's Run, a tributary of Great Hunting Creek, runs through the park; a bridge constructed by the Orange and Alexandria Railroad in 1856 crosses the Run at the edge of the park, and is listed on the National Register of Historic Places.

== Transit ==
The area is served by the Eisenhower Avenue Washington Metro and the King Street station of the Washington Metro and the adjacent Alexandria station (officially called Alexandria Union Station) with Virginia Railway Express and Amtrak rail service and DASH (routes: OTC, 30, 31, 32, 33, 102) and WMATA Metrobus (routes: 28A, 29K, 29N, NH2, REX) service to the wider Washington metropolitan area.
