= Richmond Highway Express =

F1X
- Richmond Highway Express

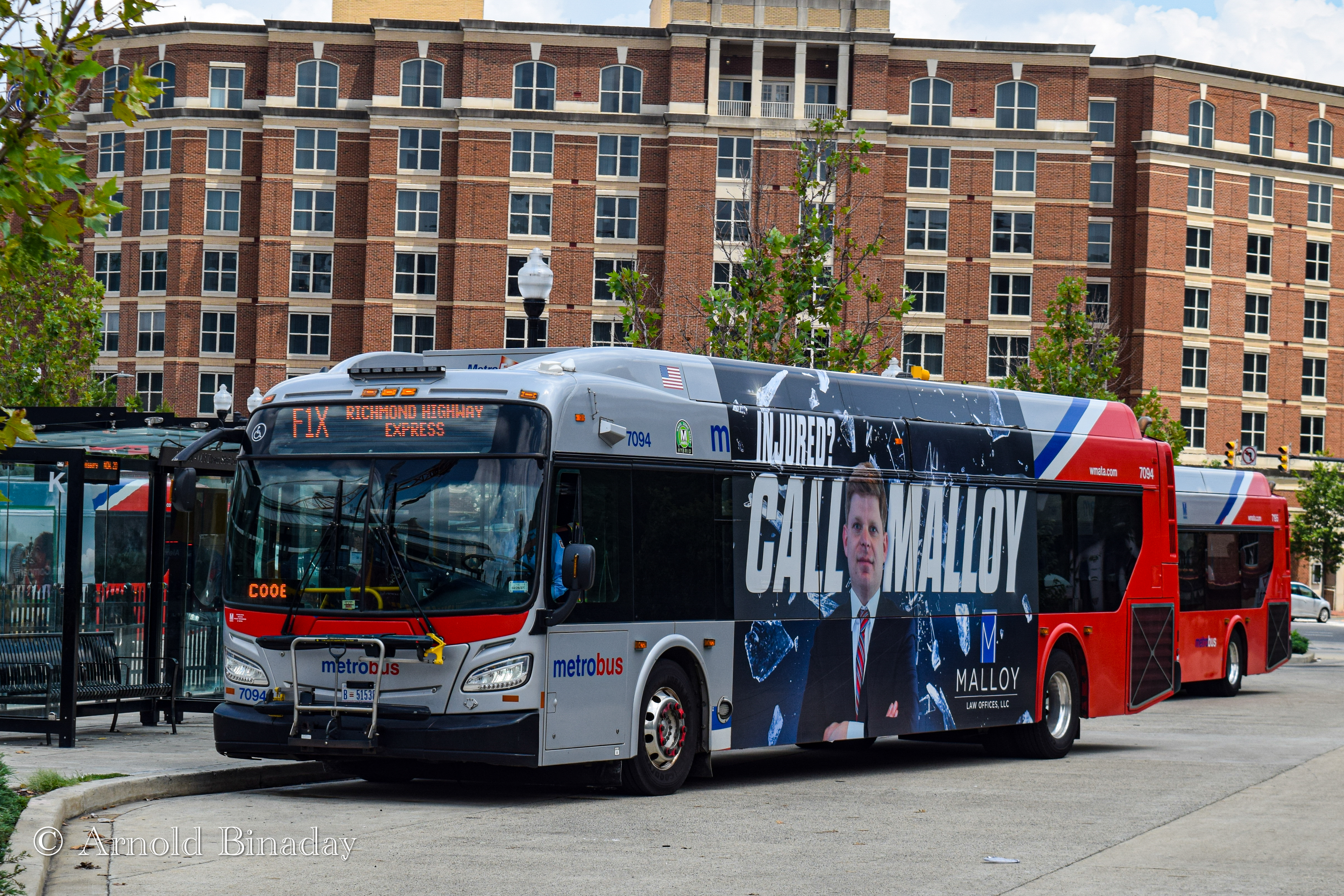
- Route F1X at King Street–Old Town station in 2026

Overview
- System: Metrobus
- Operator: Washington Metropolitan Area Transit Authority
- Garage: Cinder Bed
- Status: Active
- Began service: REX: September 26, 2004; F1X: June 29, 2025
- Ended service: REX: June 28, 2025
- Predecessors: Metrobus 9A, REX

Route
- Locale: City of Alexandria; Fairfax County
- Communities served: Old Town Alexandria, Huntington, Groveton, Hybla Valley, Mount Vernon, Woodlawn
- Landmarks served: King Street–Old Town station, Alexandria Union Station, Eisenhower Avenue station, Huntington station, Fort Belvoir
- Start: King Street–Old Town station
- Via: Richmond Highway
- End: Fort Belvoir
- Length: 15 miles (24.14 km)

Service
- Level: Daily
- Frequency: 15 minutes (Peak Hours); 20 minutes (Weekday Middays, Saturdays and Sundays); 30 minutes (After 9PM)
- Operates: 5:00 AM – 11:00 PM
- Ridership: 702,855 (FY 2025)
- Transfers: SmarTrip only
- Timetable: Richmond Highway Express

The Richmond Highway Express designated as Route F1X, previously known as REX is a daily limited-stop bus route operated by the Washington Metropolitan Area Transit Authority between King Street–Old Town station of the Blue and Yellow Lines of the Washington Metro and Fort Belvoir. This line runs through the Richmond Highway (U.S. Route 1) corridor in Fairfax County, Virginia. This line provides a cross-county service from the neighborhood of Old Town Alexandria in Alexandria, Virginia and the military base of Fort Belvoir in Fairfax County.

== Route ==
F1X runs from its northern end at King Street–Old Town station, south through Eisenhower Avenue station, Huntington station and Mount Vernon, Virginia before ending at Fort Belvoir Post Exchange and Commissary. The service runs limited stops along Richmond Highway in Alexandria between Huntington Station and Fort Belvoir. Local stops are provided by Fairfax Connector routes 151, 161, 162, 171, and 308. The F1X also provides service through Groveton, Virginia, and Hybla Valley, Virginia throughout the route.

=== Stops ===
REX bus stops were provided on the special blue-and-gold sign, instead of the traditional red Metrobus stop signs until the roll out of the better bus network began on June 29, 2025. The F1X now the same bus stop signs as all the other Metrobuses.

Bus stop	Direction	Connections
Alexandria, Virginia
King Street – Old Town station Bus Bay K	Southbound station, Northbound terminal	Amtrak and VRE (at Alexandria Union Station); DASH: 30, 31, 32, 33, 102, King Street Trolley; Metrobus: A71, F20, F23, F24, P90; Washington Metro:
Dulaney Street / Duke Street	Bidirectional	DASH: 32; Metrobus: P90
Mill Road / Eisenhower Avenue	Southbound	DASH: 32; Metrobus: P90
Eisenhower Avenue / Hoffman Street Eisenhower Avenue station	Bidirectional	DASH: 32; Metrobus: P90; Washington Metro:
Huntington, Virginia
Huntington Avenue / Metroview Parkway Huntington station	Bidirectional	Metrobus: A11; Fairfax Connector: 101, 109, 171, 301, 310; Washington Metro:
Richmond Highway / South Kings Highway	Bidirectional	Fairfax Connector: 151, 159, 162, 171
Beacon Hill, Virginia
Richmond Highway / Southgate Drive	Bidirectional	Fairfax Connector: 151, 159, 161, 162, 171
Groveton, Virginia
Richmond Highway / Lockheed Boulevard	Southbound	Fairfax Connector: 151, 159, 162, 171
Richmond Highway / Dart Drive	Northbound	Fairfax Connector: 151, 159, 161, 171
Richmond Highway / Arlington Drive	Bidirectional	Fairfax Connector: 151, 159, 161, 162, 171
Hybla Valley, Virginia
Richmond Highway / Belford Drive	Bidirectional	Fairfax Connector: 151, 159, 171
Richmond Highway / Ladson Lane	Bidirectional	Fairfax Connector: 151, 152, 159, 171, 308
Mount Vernon, Virginia
Richmond Highway / Mohawk Lane	Bidirectional	Fairfax Connector: 171, 308
Richmond Highway / Frye Road	Bidirectional	Fairfax Connector: 171, 308
Richmond Highway / Lukens Lane	Bidirectional	Fairfax Connector: 171, 308
Woodlawn, Virginia
Richmond Highway / Sacramento Drive	Southbound	Fairfax Connector: 151, 171, 308
Richmond Highway / Cooper Road	Northbound	Fairfax Connector: 171, 308
Richmond Highway / Jeff Todd Way	Southbound	Fairfax Connector: 171, 308
Richmond Highway / Mount Vernon Memorial Highway	Northbound	Fairfax Connector: 151, 171, 308
Fort Belvoir
Fort Belvoir Community Hospital	Southbound Terminal, Northbound Stop	
Fort Belvoir Post Exchange & Commissary	Southbound Terminal, Northbound Stop	
Notes: 1. The route loops around Fort Belvoir between Fort Belvoir Community Hospital and Fort Belvoir Post Exchange & Commissary. Northbound and Southbound stops are provided in both directions of the road 2. Passengers traveling toward Fort Belvoir must have a valid Federal or State issue photo I.D. before entering the military base for security procedures. Customers that does not carry an I.D. will have to exit the bus and wait for the Northbound bus route.; 3. Weeknight trips ends at Fort Belvoir Community Hospital, and does not serve Fort Belvoir Post Exchange & Commissary.

== Service ==
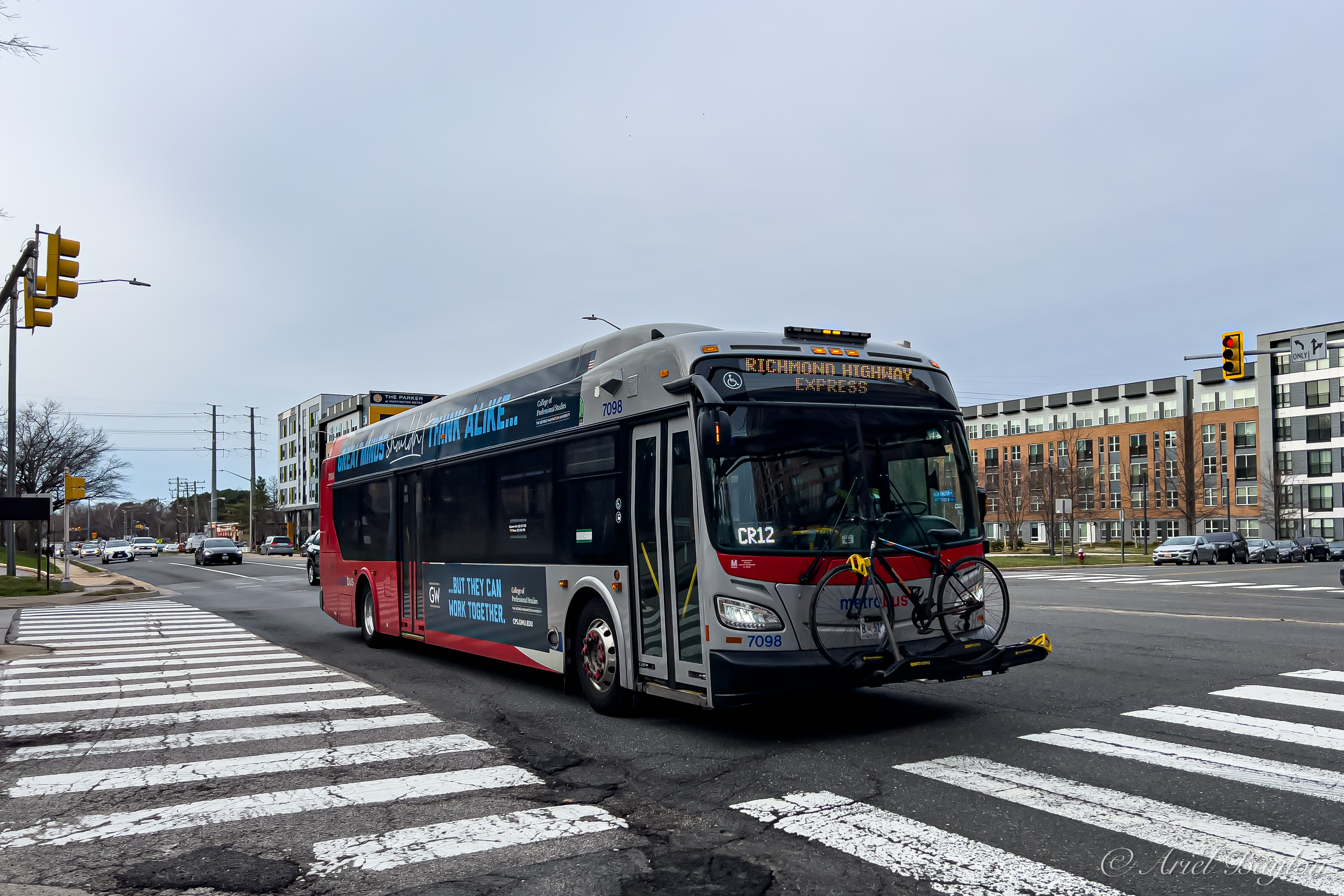
Bus 7098, a 2011 New Flyer XDE40 bus displaying the 'RICHMOND HIGHWAY EXPRESS' destination sign.

F1X operates seven days a week with frequent service during peak hours. All runs took place on board on any bus from Cinder Bed division. However, it was previously operated by using the 2008 New Flyer DE40LFA diesel-electric hybrid buses (6301–6312), and were painted in a blue-and-gold REX paint scheme. The original REX bus fleet consisted of 12 now-retired 2000 Orion VI buses (2073–2084). The 2000 Orion VI buses were wrapped in the REX scheme, instead of being painted. The second REX fleet consisted of 12 now-retired 2006 Orion VII CNG buses (2674–2685). The Orion VII CNGs were the first set which is painted in the REX scheme, until they were all repainted between June and August 2014. The third REX fleet consisted of 12 2010 New Flyer DE40LFA diesel-electric hybrid buses (6550–6561) before being repainted back into the red local scheme in 2018. The REX has previously operated out of Four Mile Run division (2004-2014) and Shepherd Parkway divisions (2014-2018). From December 26, 2021 onward, the F1X route is operated entirely with regular Metrobuses.

== History ==
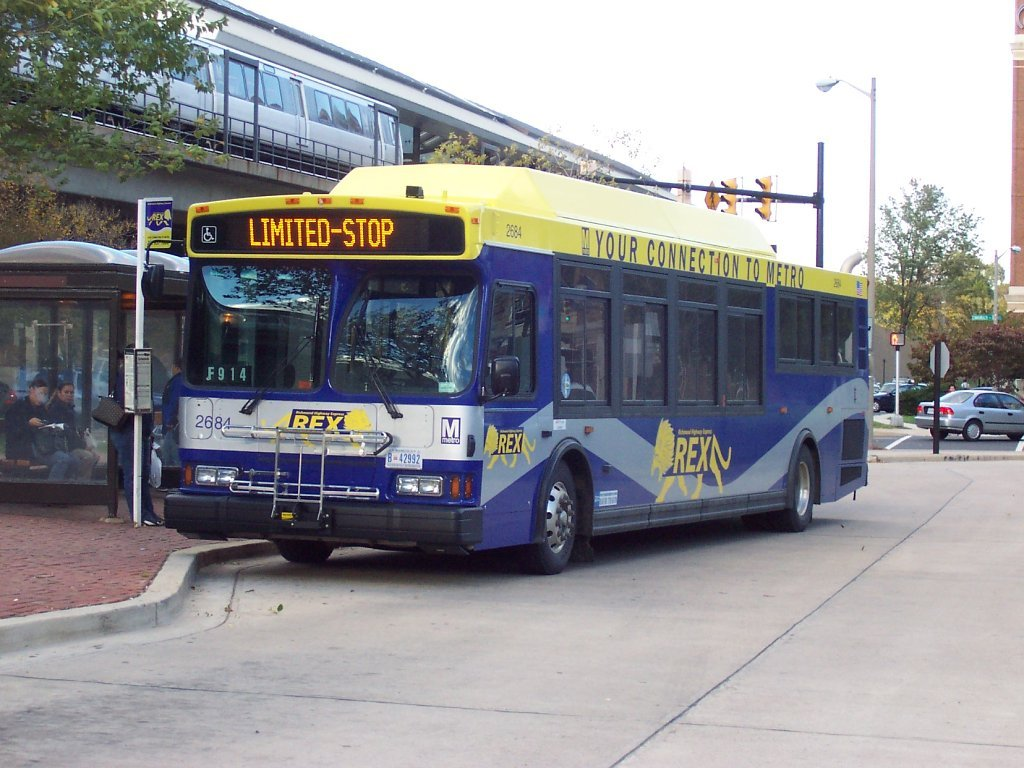
Bus 2684, one of the 12 2006 Orion VII CNG buses that were in the REX scheme until 2014.

REX began service on September 26, 2004. The REX takes over the southern portion of the 9A, which ran between Pentagon Station and Lorton VRE Station. The remaining portion of the 9A is provided by Fairfax Connector route 171, as the REX ends at Fort Belvoir. The fare of the initial REX route was $1.00, for a one-year demonstration period. The REX runs via the Jackson Loop at Fort Belvoir, although some trips alters via Pohick Road, when the Jackson Loop is closed. When the REX reaches Fort Belvoir, all customers that are on the REX follows the security procedure of Fort Belvoir, as the terminal is a military base. These procedures runs throughout all bus routes that serves Fort Belvoir. In 2008, the alternate terminal of the REX night trips was moved to Woodlawn at Old Mill Road. The night REX trips does not serve Fort Belvoir. In addition to these changes, the REX route adds a Saturday Supplemental trip, where it adds more trips on holiday, when REX runs on a Saturday schedule. The Saturday Supplemental trips operates up to Woodlawn, the same place where the night REX trips ends. Alongside with these changes, the special $1.00 fare was changed to the same fare as any regular Metrobus routes in January, 2009. In 2011, Fort Belvoir open doors to all REX trips, following the opening of Fort Belvoir Community Hospital. REX retained the full route until 2017, when the route was extended to the Fort Belvoir Post Exchange/Commissary. This extension is only effective during weekdays, as the REX does not operate at the Post Exchange/Commissary on the weekends.

== Service changes ==
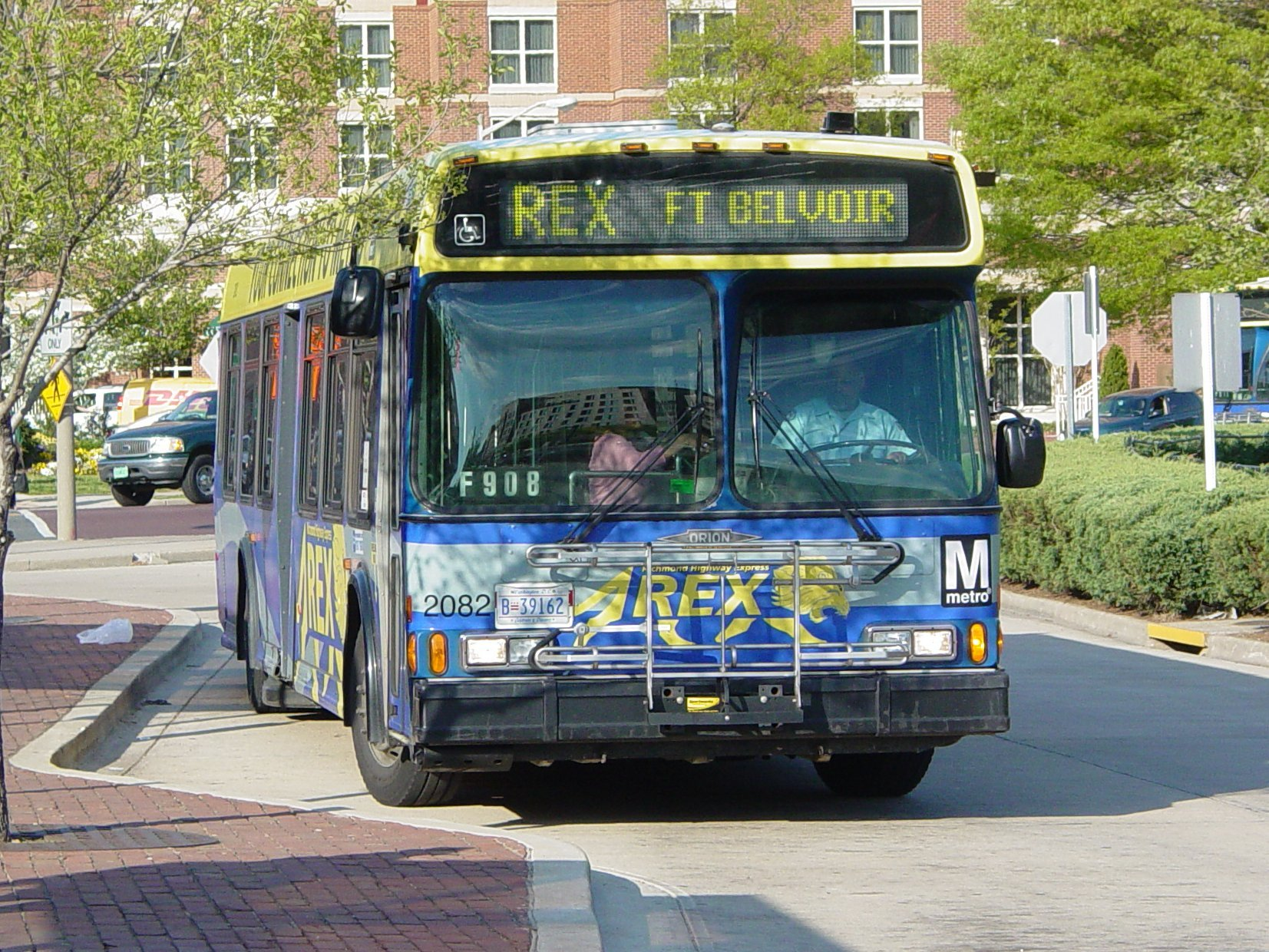
Bus 2082, one of the 12 2000 Orion VI buses that were originally in the REX scheme until 2006.

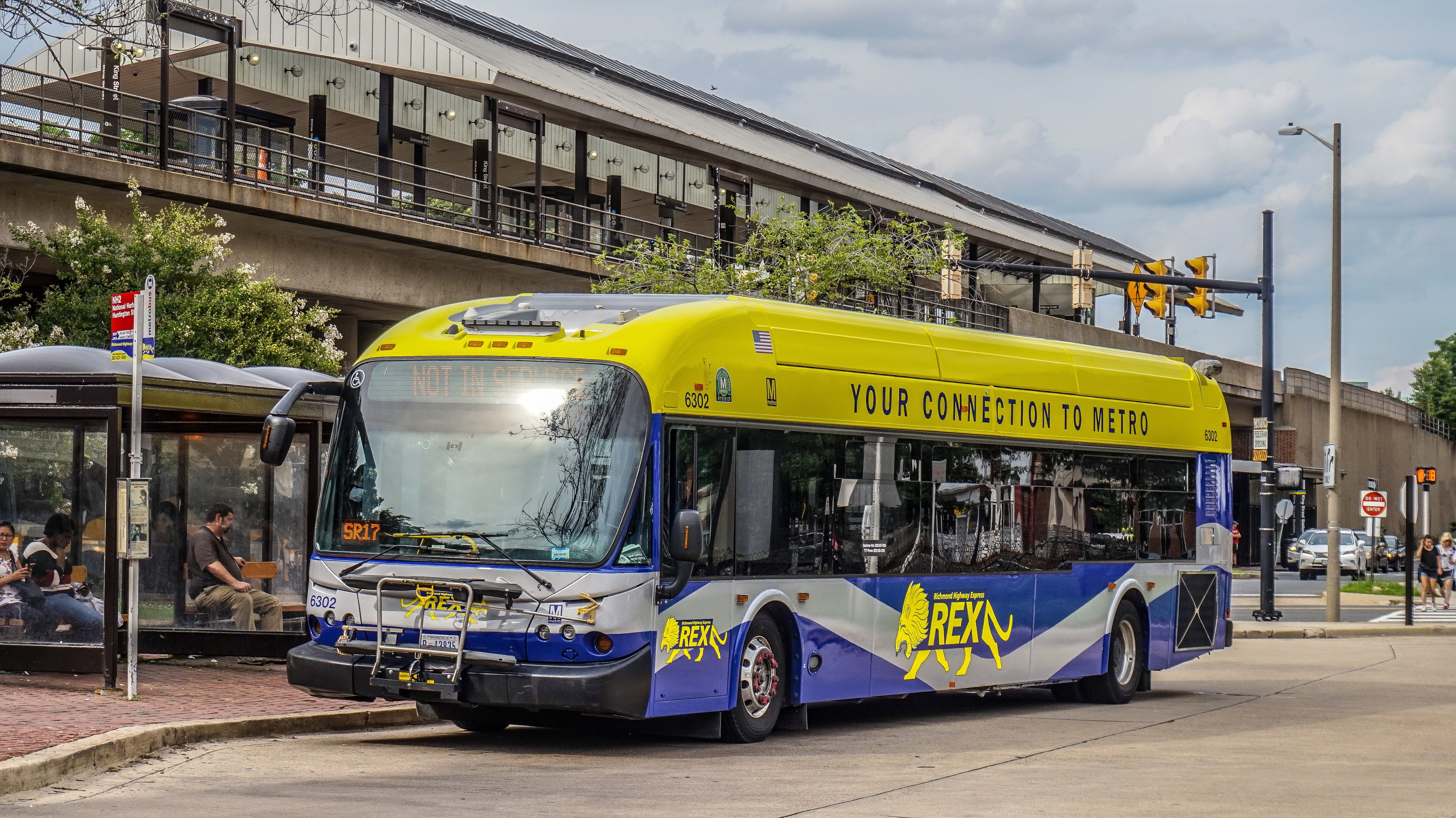
Bus 6302, one of 13 2008 New Flyer DE40LFA buses used on the REX between 2018 and 2021. These buses replaced 12 2010 New Flyer DE40LFA buses (6550-6561) used between 2014 and 2018.

The REX does not change its main route since its opening, although times and stops were changed throughout time. Since the first time changes in the mid-2000s, REX adds more trips when there is a high demand in the route.

On August 7, 2011, the Fort Belvoir Community Hospital opened, opening the gates for 24 hours. The Fort Belvoir gates hour changes leads the night REX trips to discontinue the alternate routing service, which ends at Woodlawn. Service towards the Dewitt Hospital at Fort Belvoir was discontinued.

On June 25, 2017, the REX weekday service was extended to the Fort Belvoir Post Exchange/Commissary via Gunston Road. REX service to Jackson Loop was discontinued. Nearby stops will be served along Gunston Road at 5th Street.

During the COVID-19 pandemic, the line began operating on its Saturday supplemental schedule beginning on March 16, 2020. It however began operating on its Sunday service on March 18, 2020. Weekend service was also reduced to operate every 30 minutes. Full service resumed on August 23, 2020.

On September 5, 2021, the line was increased to operate every 20 minutes daily.

As part of WMATA's Better Bus Redesign beginning on June 29, 2025, the REX was renamed into the F1X, discontinuing the REX branding. The route remained the same from the former REX counterpart.

== Future ==
In 2015, Fairfax County and WMATA plans to expand service through Richmond Highway. The major plans is to convert the REX route into a Bus rapid transit route, which the project is known as "Embark Richmond Highway." This project is to bring more service along Richmond Highway by extending service from Fort Belvoir up to Woodbridge. The idea of this project will add new stations, by widening Richmond Highway in order to make the dedicated stops for the new BRT route and the REX.
