= King Street (Alexandria, Virginia) =

Road in Alexandria, Virginia, United States

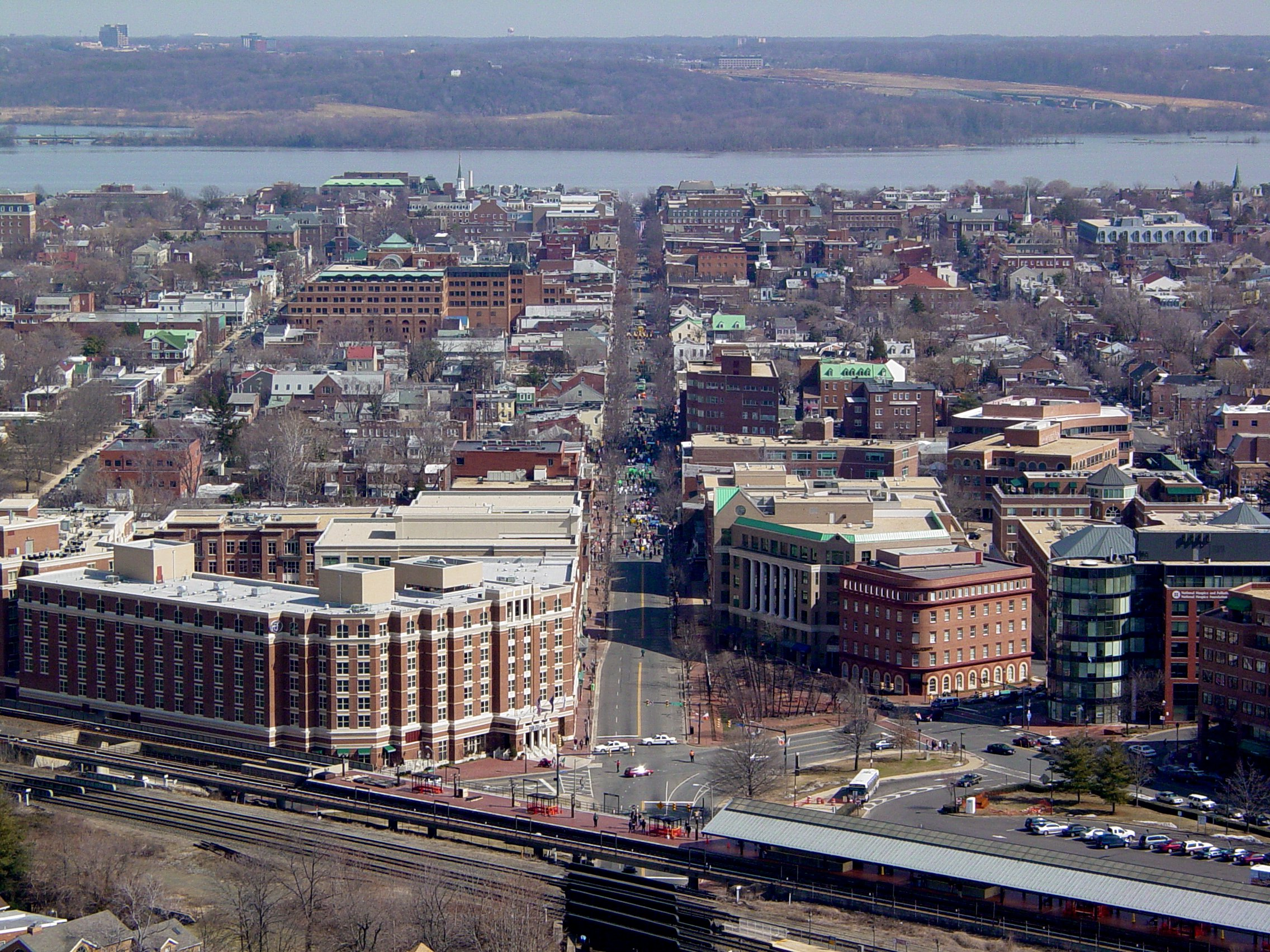
- King Street through Old Town Alexandria, as seen from the George Washington Masonic National Memorial.

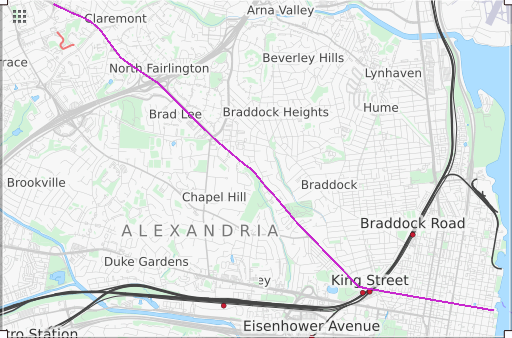
- Map showing King Street's path through the city
- Part of: City of Alexandria
- Length: 5.1 miles (8.2 km)
- East end: King Street Park at 0 King St Alexandria, VA 22314 38.804119°N 77.039282°W
- West end: S George Mason Drive 38.844921°N 77.114696°W

King Street is a major road in Alexandria, Virginia, United States and historic Old Town Alexandria. It extends westward from the Potomac River waterfront near the Torpedo Factory Art Center and nearby bustling tourist gift shops and restaurants, passing City Hall and the Alexandria General District Court.

== History ==
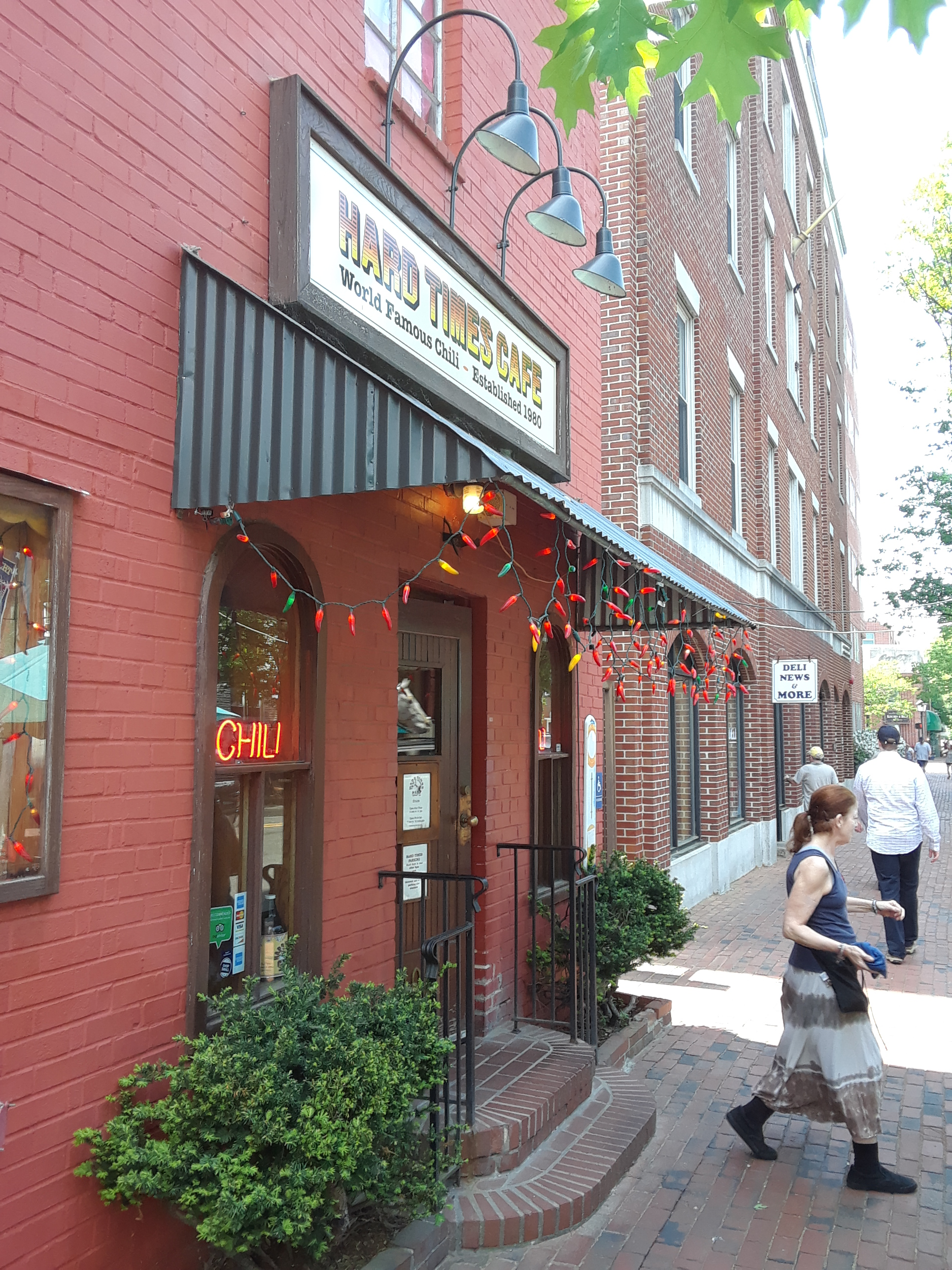
Cafe along King Street

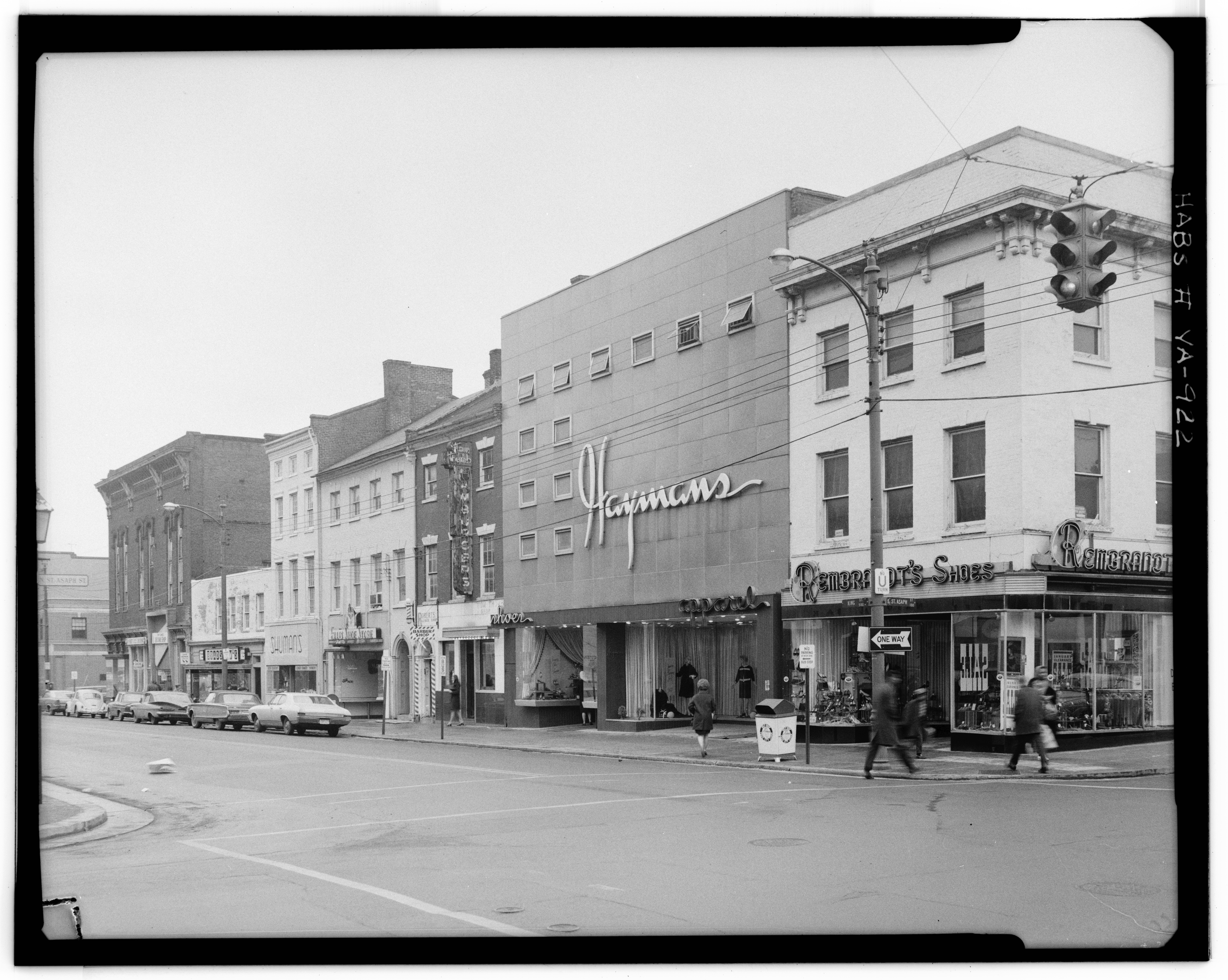
King Street in the mid-twentieth century

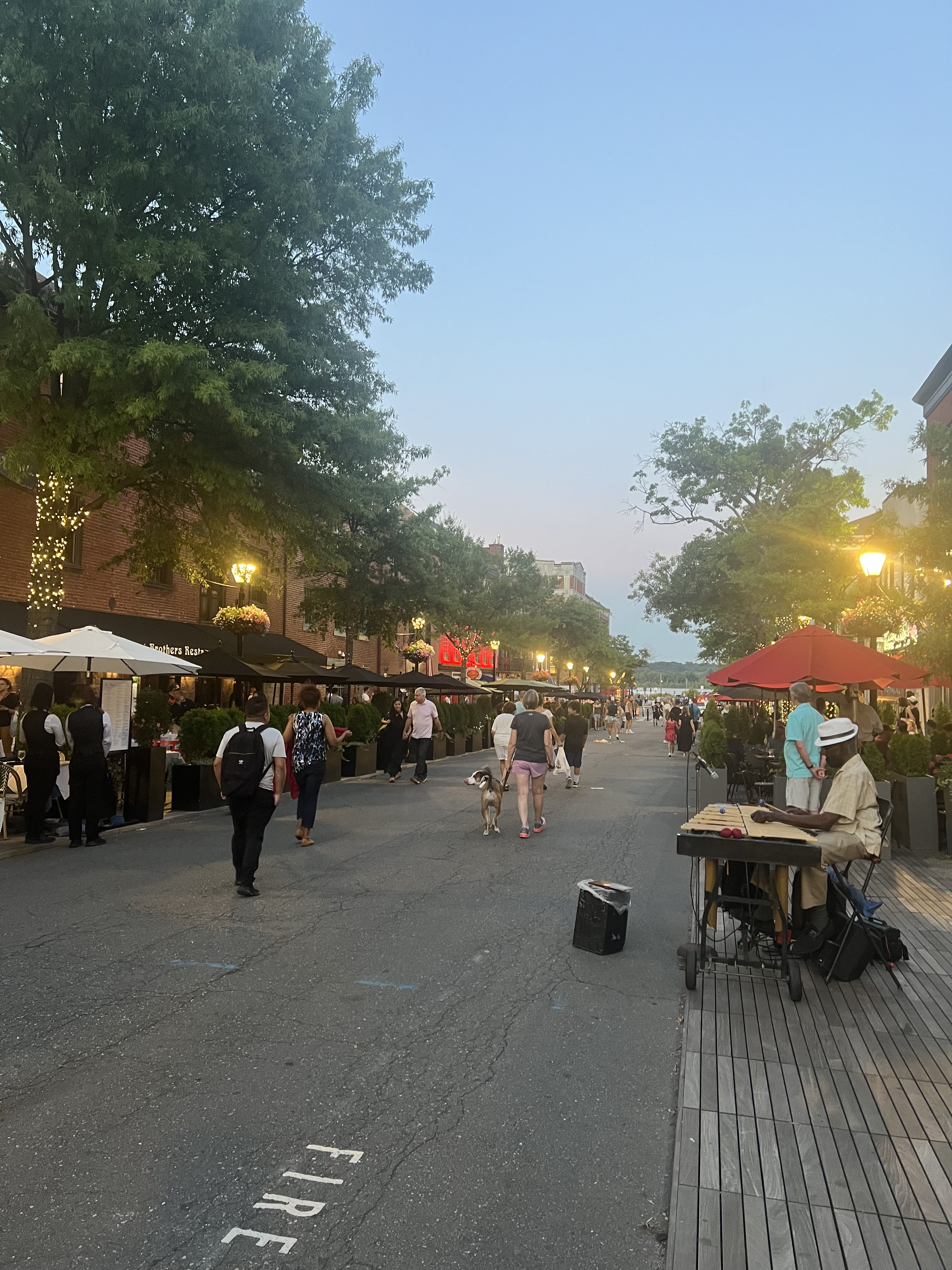
King Street pedestrian zone.

In 1964 Richard Muzzrole begins nine years of excavations along King Street. In 1965 artifacts from King Street homes, shops, and taverns are excavated by Malcolm Watkins of the Smithsonian Institution. During the 1960s urban renewal prompted the demolition of a six block area along King Street. In 1965 Bulldozers revealed creamware, glasswork, porcelain, and pottery. Bulldozers preparing for parking garage construction revealed brick lined wells. In 1977 Pamela Cressey begins excavations at the King Street courthouse. Deep wear marks on wine bottles found within King Street privies reveal the practice of refilling bottles at taverns.

In 2007 the American Planning Association listed King Street as a "2011 Great Place in America" within the "Great Streets" category.

King Street is currently seen as an active strip of commerce and tourism that successfully accommodates both Alexandria's local residents as well as its visitors. Historically the street was used as access to the seaport and later as a main center of trade. The balance between past and present is noticeable with the vitality of the street's noteworthy character. Architectural and demolition regulations have been employed to allow for the continued visual appeal of 18th and 19th century buildings. Zoning laws, particularly those established in 2005 and 2007, are responsible for ensuring mixed use on this street. Various businesses, outdoor dining and other activities can be found all along King Street. One amenity to this street is the Market Square found at Alexandria City Hall as it is one of the oldest U.S. farmers markets and is often used to provide venue space for concerts, festivals, and community events. Other features found on King Street include Alexandria City Hall, which is in the style of the period during the Second Empire, and clock tower that was designed by Benjamin Henry Latrobe. The Torpedo Factory Art Center is another hotspot for tourism and is currently used as studio housing for artists.

205 King Street, a spite house, dates to the late 18th century or early 19th. It is the oldest of Old Town's spite houses.

In 2021, the 100 block of King Street was pedestrianized. The pedestrian zone expanded to Waterfront Park in 2022 and the 200 block in 2024.

== Route ==
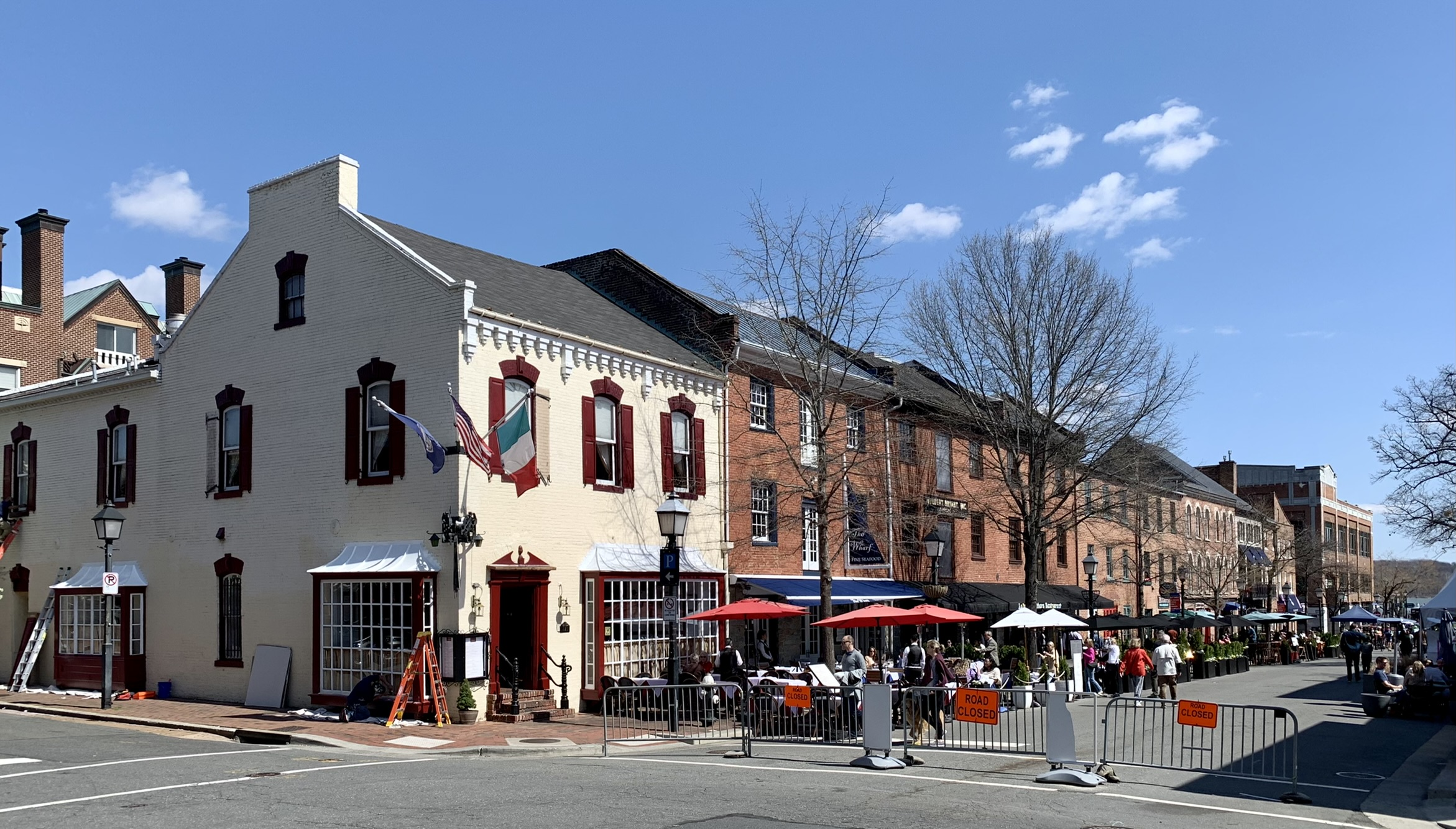
A number of popular restaurants and shops line King Street.

On reaching the Washington Metro and Amtrak stations and the George Washington National Masonic Memorial, King Street bends. Between Russell Road and Janney's Lane, green bike lanes exist. Wealthier residents fought against these. King Street passes Chinquapin Recreation Center, Alexandria City High School and several historic churches, becoming Leesburg Pike as it leaves Alexandria at Bailey's Crossroads. King Street becomes State Route 7 west of Washington Street (State Route 400). In Old Town, King Street is designated as the dividing line between north and south in the addressing system, while Duke Street (State Route 236) is designated as the dividing line in the West End area of Alexandria. King Street follows the original southwest border for the District of Columbia, becoming Leesburg Pike then Route 7 as it extends westward into Fairfax County.

== Transportation ==
The Washington Metro has a station at King Street, just west of Old Town, on the Blue and Yellow Lines. The King Street Trolley travels along King Street from the metro station to Alexandria City Hall every 15 minutes.
