= Huntington station (Washington Metro) =

Washington Metro station

Coordinates: 38.794065°N 77.075261°W

Huntington
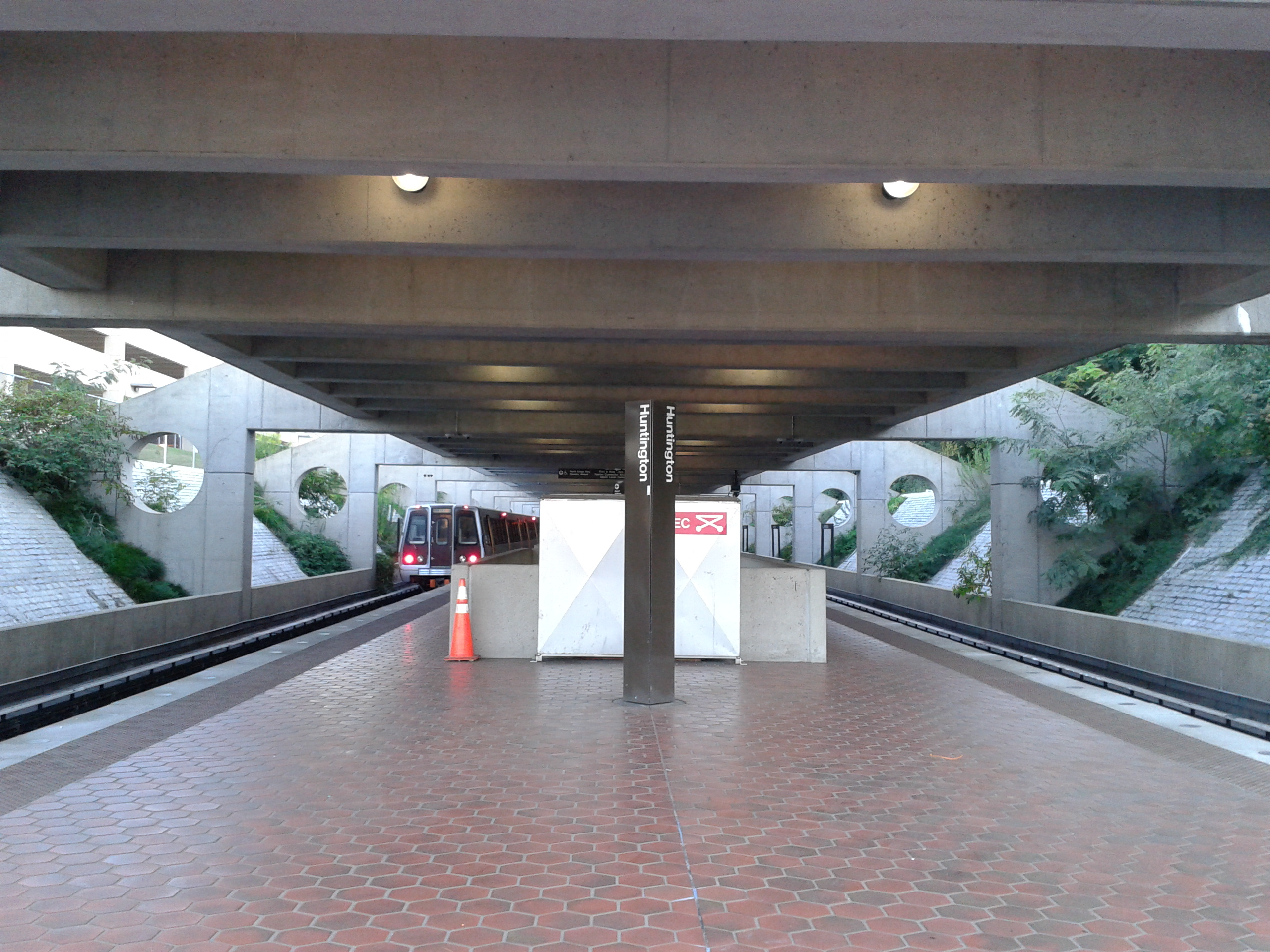
- Huntington station platform facing south in September 2014

General information
- Location: 2701 Huntington Avenue; Huntington, Virginia, U.S.
- Owner: Washington Metropolitan Area Transit Authority
- Platforms: 1 island platform
- Tracks: 2
- Connections: Metrobus: A11, F1X; Fairfax Connector: 101, 109, 151, 152, 159, 161, 162, 171, 301, 310

Construction
- Structure type: Open cut
- Parking: 3,617 spaces
- Cycle facilities: Capital Bikeshare, 34 racks, 12 lockers
- Accessible: Yes

Other information
- Station code: C15

History
- Opened: December 17, 1983; 42 years ago
- Rebuilt: 2019

Passengers
- 2025: 4,391 (average weekday)
- Rank: 41 of 98

Services
Preceding station	Washington Metro	Following station
Terminus	Yellow Line	Eisenhower Avenue toward Mount Vernon Square or Greenbelt
Former services
Preceding station	Washington Metro	Following station
Terminus	Blue Line	Eisenhower Avenue toward New Carrollton
Route map
Location

Huntington station is an island-platformed Washington Metro station in the Huntington area of Fairfax County, Virginia, United States (though its mailing address says Alexandria). The station was opened on December 17, 1983, and is operated by the Washington Metropolitan Area Transit Authority (WMATA). Serving as the southern terminus for the Yellow Line, the station is built into a hillside; the south mezzanine, along with escalator access, is accessible via an incline elevator.

The station serves the suburban area of Fairfax County and is a popular commuter station with over 3,000 parking spaces. It is located between North Kings Highway (State Route 241) and Huntington Avenue, with parking facilities and station entrances available off of both roads. Service began on December 17, 1983, making it the first station to open in Fairfax County, and the first to extend the system beyond the Capital Beltway. The station is located on the ruins of Fort Lyon, a Civil War-era fort.

== History ==
Originally scheduled to open in summer 1982, its opening was delayed due to both unavailability of new subway cars and the lack of a test track. Construction of the station was complete by summer 1982, and in September 1983 Metro announced the station would open that December as the new cars would be ready for service. The station opened on December 17, 1983, with Yellow Line service instead of the originally planned Blue Line service due to a railcar shortage at the time of opening. Its opening coincided with the completion of 4.2 miles (6.8 km) of rail between National Airport and Huntington and the opening of the Braddock Road, Eisenhower Avenue, and King Street–Old Town stations.

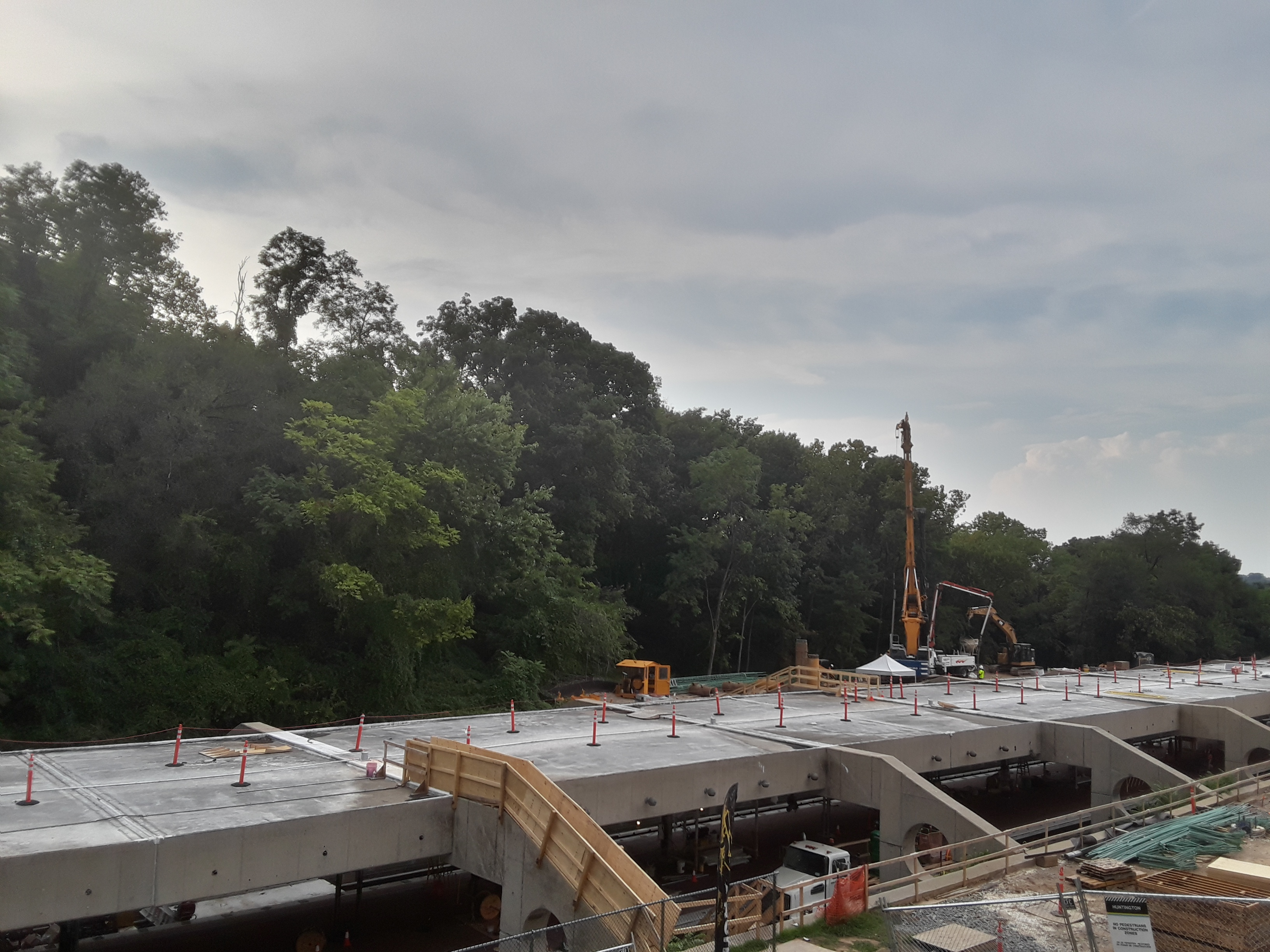
Huntington station undergoing platform renovations in August 2019

In May 2018, Metro announced an extensive renovation of platforms at twenty stations across the system. The Blue and Yellow Lines south of Ronald Reagan Washington National Airport station, including the Huntington station, would be closed from May to September 2019. This will allow for the eventual demolition of an abandoned parking structure at Huntington, as well as the rehabilitation of a track crossover. The platform at the Huntington station itself was rebuilt from January to May 2020.

Between September 10, 2022 and November 5, 2022, Huntington was closed due to the Potomac Yard station tie-in, closing all stations south of Ronald Reagan Washington National Airport station. Shuttle buses were provided throughout the shutdown. Additionally, beginning on November 6, 2022, Blue Line trains began serving Huntington due to the suspension of the Yellow Line from the 14th Street Bridge project. Trains operated between Huntington and New Carrollton stations until May 7, 2023, when service on the Yellow Line resumed but truncated from its northeastern terminus from Greenbelt to Mount Vernon Square.

In August 2025, Capital Bikeshare was installed by Fairfax County at the north entrance along with several stations along Huntington Ave.. Another Capital Bikeshare station was added by the south entrance in June 2026. Several others stations added at the same time, expanding the reach of Metro.

== Station layout ==
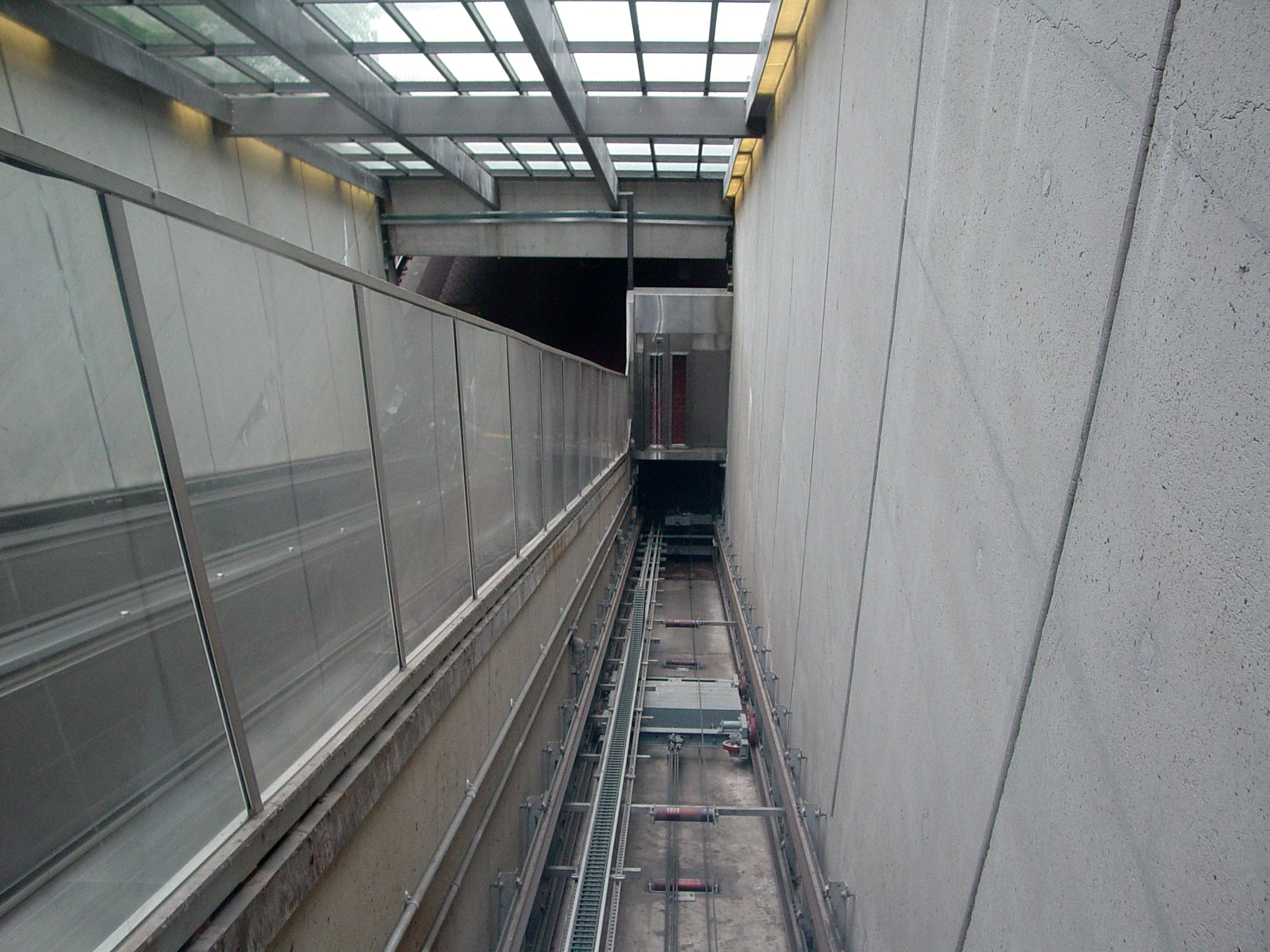
Inside Huntington Station's incline elevator.

Architecturally, Huntington station is different from the rest of the Metro network. It is partially elevated and built into the surrounding hillside. Riders enter the station from the north on a viaduct carrying the tracks from downtown Washington, D.C., but the south end of the island platform is below grade. The tracks continue into short tunnels in the hill, allowing for a future extension. The canopy is supported by buttresses that bridge the tracks into the sloped walls of the depression in which the station is built.

As a result of the unusual topography, there is an incline elevator at this station, the only one installed anywhere in the Metrorail system and one of only a handful of such elevators in the United States. As recently as 2014, WMATA itself was unable to explain why the station had been built with an inclined elevator rather than a more conventional arrangement.

A 2023 article in Greater Greater Washington offers a likely explanation, situating the inclinator within an earlier WMATA plan to use inclined elevators throughout the system. Following a December 1969 recommendation from the House Subcommittee on Public Buildings and Grounds—issued in response to disability advocates' demands for wheelchair access—WMATA pursued "inclinators" because they could share shafts with the stairs and escalators planned for each station. The agency applied for federal grants in late 1970 to develop a prototype, but the Urban Mass Transportation Administration declined funding in December 1971, reasoning that Metro's architecturally distinct stations would yield an inclinator design that could not be reused by other transit systems. The system-wide plan was dropped in favor of conventional vertical elevators. Farragut North originally opened with an inclined elevator as well, but it has since been removed, leaving Huntington's as the only one remaining in the Metrorail system.

Huntington is one of only two stations that is serviced exclusively by the Yellow Line, the other being Eisenhower Avenue.

S	Street level	Upper level exit/entrance, buses, parking
M	Mezzanine	Fare gates, ticket machines, station manager
T Platform level	Northbound	toward Greenbelt (Eisenhower Avenue) →
T Platform level	Island platform
T Platform level	Northbound	toward Greenbelt (Eisenhower Avenue) →
S	Street level	Lower level exit/entrance, buses, parking, fare gates, ticket machines, station manager

== Buses and parking ==
Bus routes from Huntington on Metrobus and Fairfax Connector serve much of southern Fairfax County, Virginia.

A new 1,424-space parking garage located on the station's east side opened on August 14, 2008. There are 3,617 parking spaces at the station. The former surface parking lot off North Kings Highway is the center of an ongoing residential and business redevelopment project. Parking at Huntington Station costs $4.85 all day on weekdays, but is free on weekends and federal holidays.
