= King Street–Old Town station =

Washington Metro station in Virginia, US

King Street – Old Town
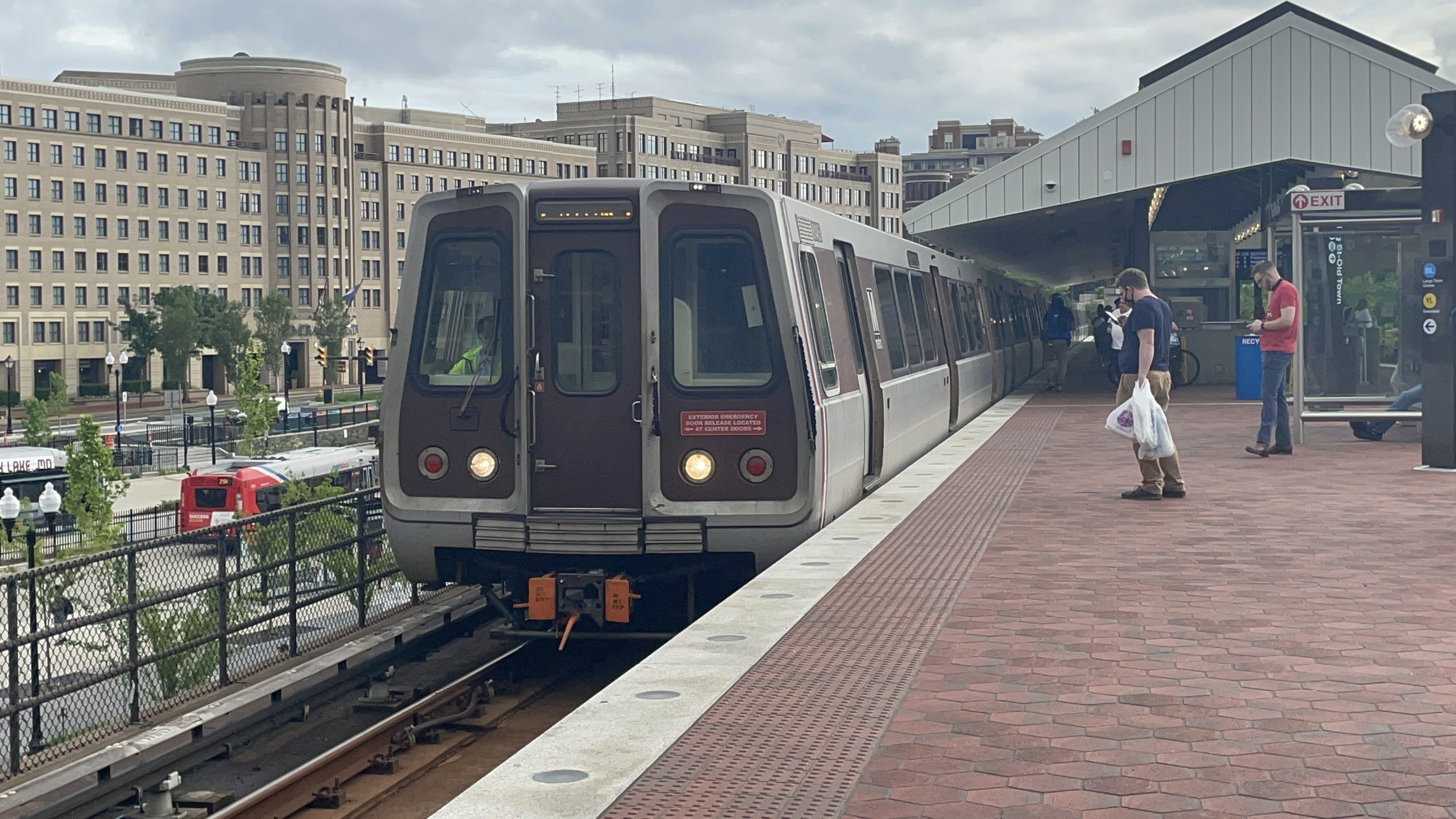
- Northbound Yellow Line train at King Street–Old Town in 2022

General information
- Location: 1900 King Street; Alexandria, Virginia
- Coordinates: 38°48′24″N 77°03′39″W
- Owner: Washington Metropolitan Area Transit Authority
- Platforms: 1 island platform
- Tracks: 2
- Connections: Amtrak at Alexandria Union Station; VRE at Alexandria Union Station; DASH: 30, 31, 32, 33, 102, King Street Trolley; Metrobus: A71, F1X, F20, F23, F24, P90

Construction
- Structure type: Embankment
- Cycle facilities: Capital Bikeshare, 34 racks
- Accessible: Yes

Other information
- Station code: C13

History
- Opened: December 17, 1983; 42 years ago
- Rebuilt: 2019
- Former names: King Street (1983–2011)

Passengers
- 2025: 4,557 (average weekday)
- Rank: 36 of 98

Services
Preceding station	Washington Metro	Following station
Eisenhower Avenue toward Huntington	Yellow Line	Braddock Road toward Mount Vernon Square or Greenbelt
Van Dorn Street toward Franconia-Springfield	Blue Line	Braddock Road toward Downtown Largo
Route map
Location

King Street–Old Town station (also known by its former name, King Street) is a Washington Metro station in Alexandria, Virginia, United States. The station opened on December 17, 1983, and is operated by the Washington Metropolitan Area Transit Authority (WMATA). Providing service for both the Blue and Yellow Lines, this is the southernmost transfer station for the two lines, as they diverge just south of the station. King Street was originally served only by the Yellow Line, until the Blue Line was extended from National Airport to Van Dorn Street in 1991.

The station is located at King Street and Commonwealth Avenue. Entrances to the station are located on King Street and on the Diagonal Road side of the station. The station has an elevated island platform over King Street west of Diagonal Road. Two fare control areas on either side of King Street provide escalator and elevator access to the platform.

== History ==
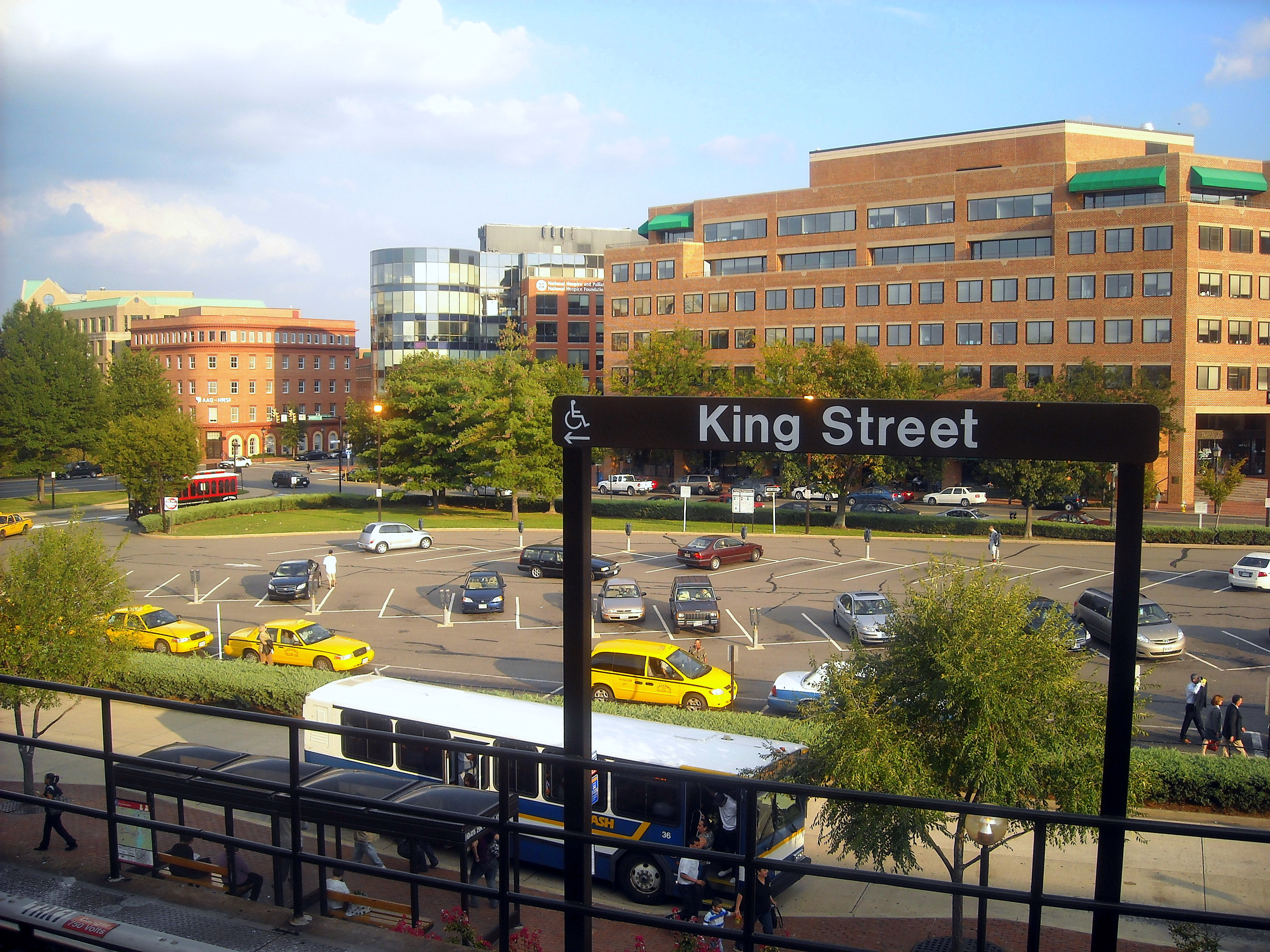
The station's parking lot and bus bay, which have since been remodeled, in 2008

On July 1, 1969, Alexandria agreed to allow the proposed Washington Metro to expand into the city. This original plan called for a station near Alexandria Union Station, where the route would then split between westbound and southbound lines. By 1971, the planned elevated line traveling along the RF&P Subdivision on the western fringe of Alexandria's downtown had fallen out of favor with Alexandria's City Council. On June 29 of that year, the City Council threatened to withdraw from Metro entirely unless the city's main Metro route was diverted underground closer to the center of the urban core. The Council stated that the original route would offer limited transit-oriented development, with the proposed King Street station being located close to the Rosemont neighborhood that the city sought to preserve. After studying the proposal for a year, the Washington Metropolitan Area Transit Authority (WMATA) and city officials agreed to continue with the original route in June 1972. The study delayed the scheduled beginning of Metro service in Alexandria from September 1975 to at least March 1977.

While WMATA had estimated that the station would cost $8,908,220, the construction contract was awarded to Alexandria-based A.A. Beiro Construction Co., which had submitted a bid of $8,159,137 by November 1977. By that time, the Alexandria Metro stations were slated to open in late 1980. Delayed again to summer 1982, its opening was further delayed due to the unavailability of new subway cars and the lack of a test track. Construction of the station was complete by summer 1982, and in September 1983 Metro announced the station would open that December as the new cars would be ready for service. The station opened on December 17, 1983. Its opening coincided with the completion of 4.2 miles (6.8 km) of rail between National Airport and Huntington and the opening of the Braddock Road, Eisenhower Avenue and Huntington stations.

By 2002, three projects were under construction or planned for King Street station. The first was a second entrance to the original station mezzanine, slated to open in July of that year at a cost of $1.1 million. The new entrance, located along King Street, was intended to provide more direct access for passengers coming from the west, including Union Station. The second project was a pedestrian tunnel underneath Duke Street that would connect the exterior of the station to the Eisenhower Valley neighborhood, where developer LCOR Inc. was building a new headquarters for the United States Patent and Trademark Office (USPTO). LCOR was required by the city of Alexandria to build the tunnel in order to encourage USPTO workers to use the Metro. The tunnel opened on July 1, 2004 at a cost of $3.5 million. The third project was a new mezzanine and an accompanying new entrance along Commonwealth Avenue, which would require an extension of the station's platform. The extended platform would feature a new canopy, visually identical to the original one. The two canopies would be kept separate in order to preserve the view of the George Washington Masonic National Memorial from King Street. Groundbreaking for the $16 million expansion occurred on September 20, 2004, and the mezzanine opened to the public in 2006.

As WMATA considered changing the names of some of its stations in 2011, a focus group proposed renaming King Street station to "Old Town" or "Old Town–King Street". In July of that year, a WMATA spokesperson dismissed calls to change the station's name, stating that the existing designation "is short. It fits within the guidelines that we’re hoping to define". In September, Alexandria's City Council expressed support for renaming the station "King Street–Old Town". WMATA approved the Council's preferred name on November 3, with the change set to take effect in June 2012. The change was projected to cost between $90,000 to $120,000, which the city would pay for via its annual Metro expenses fund that it received from the Northern Virginia Transportation Commission.

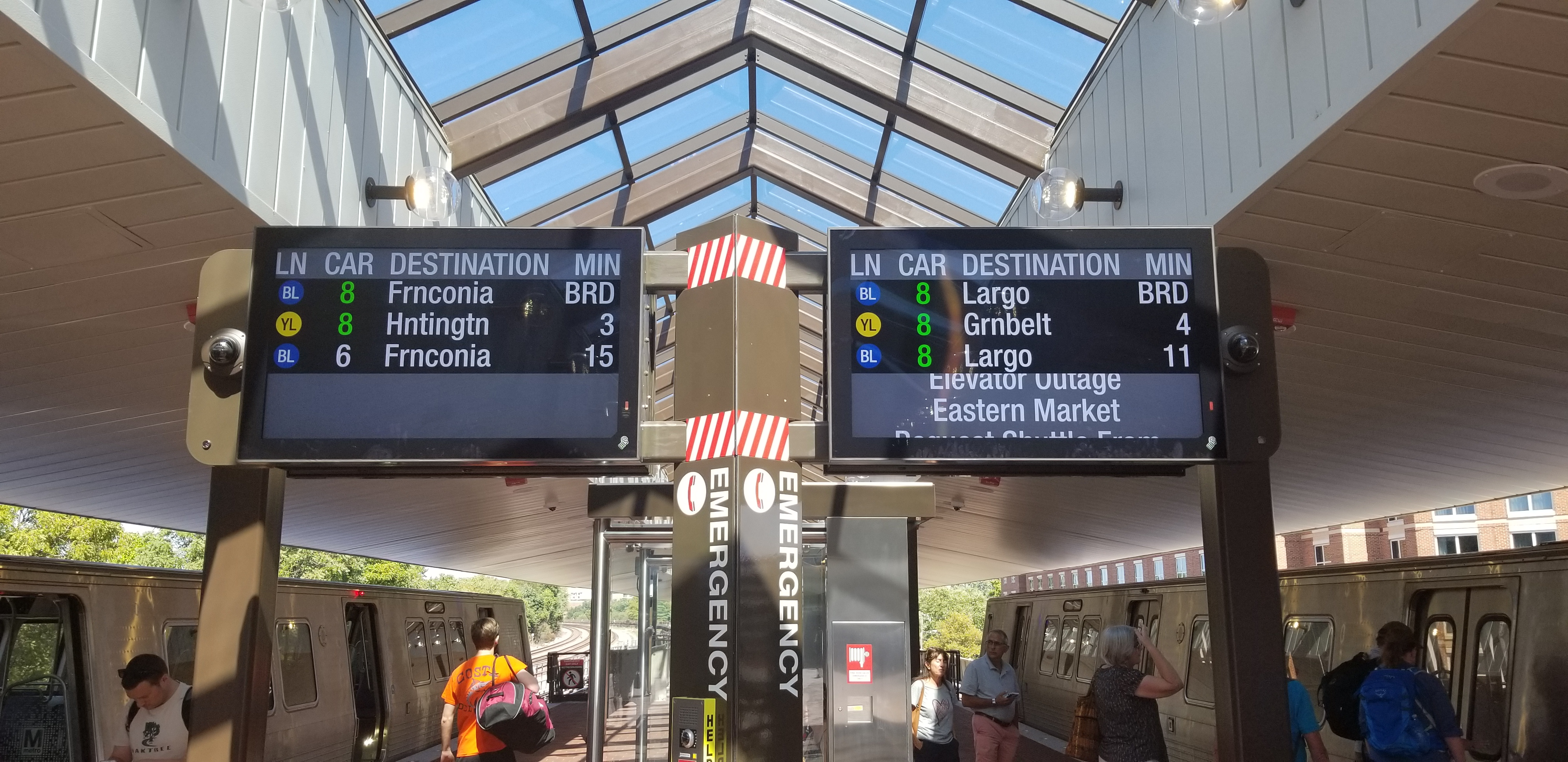
The station's renovated platform in September 2019

In May 2018, Metro announced an extensive renovation of platforms at twenty stations across the system. The Blue and Yellow Lines south of Ronald Reagan Washington National Airport station, including the King Street–Old Town station, were closed from May 25 to September 9, 2019, during which the platforms at this station were rebuilt, along with new platform tiles, new passenger information displays, and other improvements.

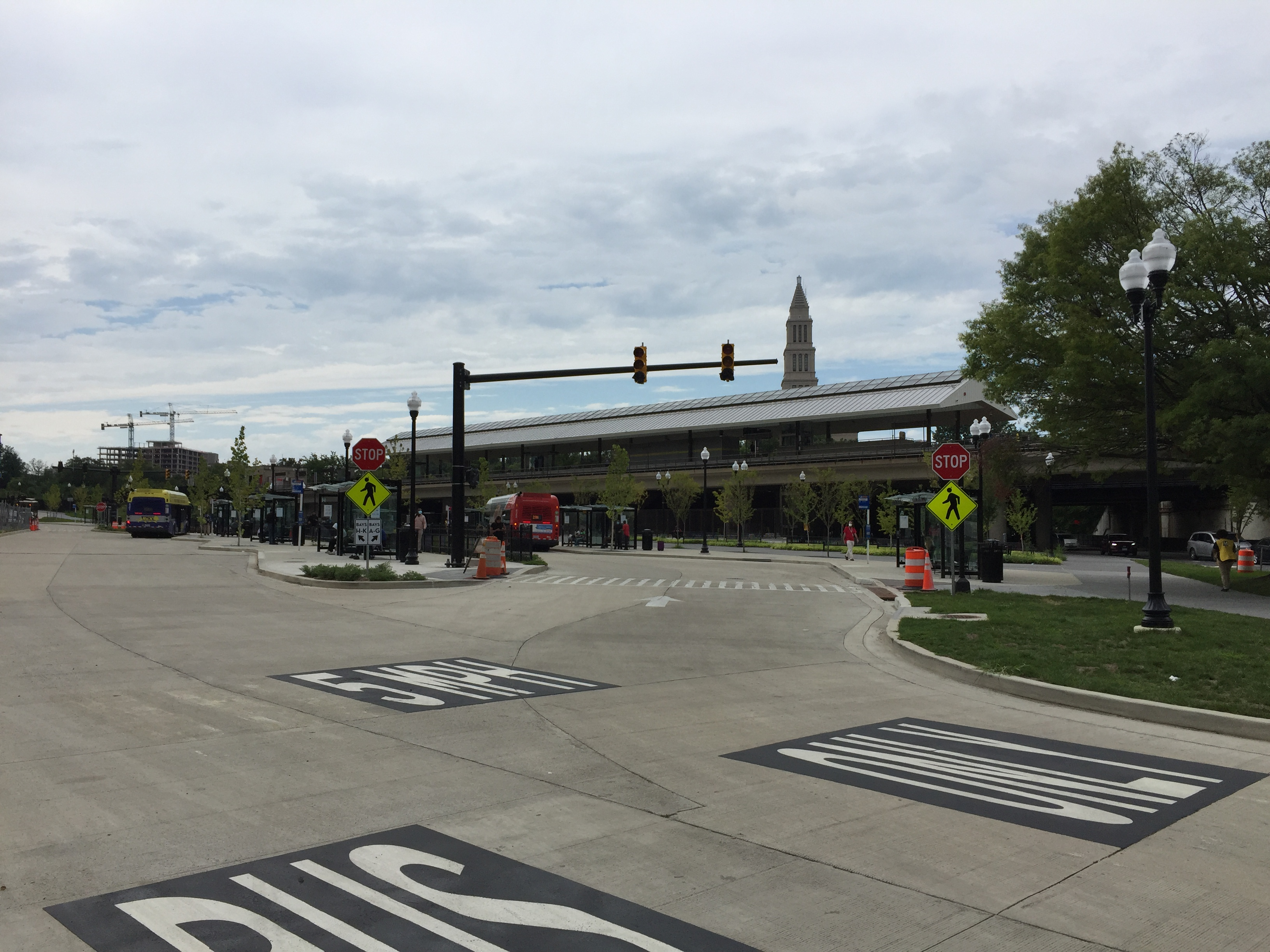
The redesigned exterior of the station in September 2021

In 2006, Alexandria began studying a project to remodel the bus, parking, and kiss and ride area of the station, which the city approved in 2012. Construction of temporary bus bays for the "King Street-Old Town Metro Access Improvement Project" began on August 6, 2018. Phase 1 of the project was initiated on November 18, 2018, when the original bus loop, kiss and ride, and taxi area was closed. Part of the new bus loop opened on June 6, 2021, when phase 2 of the project began. The entire bus loop opened on September 5, 2021. The project eliminated the station's metered parking while adding three additional bus bays, larger storm sewer pipes and improved stormwater treatment facilities, LED lighting, real-time transit service displays, and designated areas for bicycles, taxis, shuttles, and kiss and ride.

Between September 10 and November 5, 2022, King Street-Old Town was closed due to the Potomac Yard station tie-in, closing all stations south of Ronald Reagan Washington National Airport station. Shuttle buses were provided throughout the shutdown.

== Transit connections ==
The station is adjacent to Alexandria Union Station, together with which it serves Old Town Alexandria and as a transit hub for the city as a whole. Plans are in place to build a tunnel to allow a direct connection between the heavy rail station and the Metro station; presently transfers must be made by exiting either station and walking along a narrow sidewalk on King Street. Both Metrobus and DASH provide service to the station. A free daily trolley service provides direct access to Old Town and the Waterfront, making many stops along King Street. Car sharing is also available. The station is about 12 blocks (one mile or 1.6 kilometers) from the intersection of King and Washington Streets; it is about 17 blocks from the Waterfront.
