= Eisenhower Avenue station =

Washington Metro station

Coordinates: 38.800383°N 77.07109°W

Eisenhower Avenue
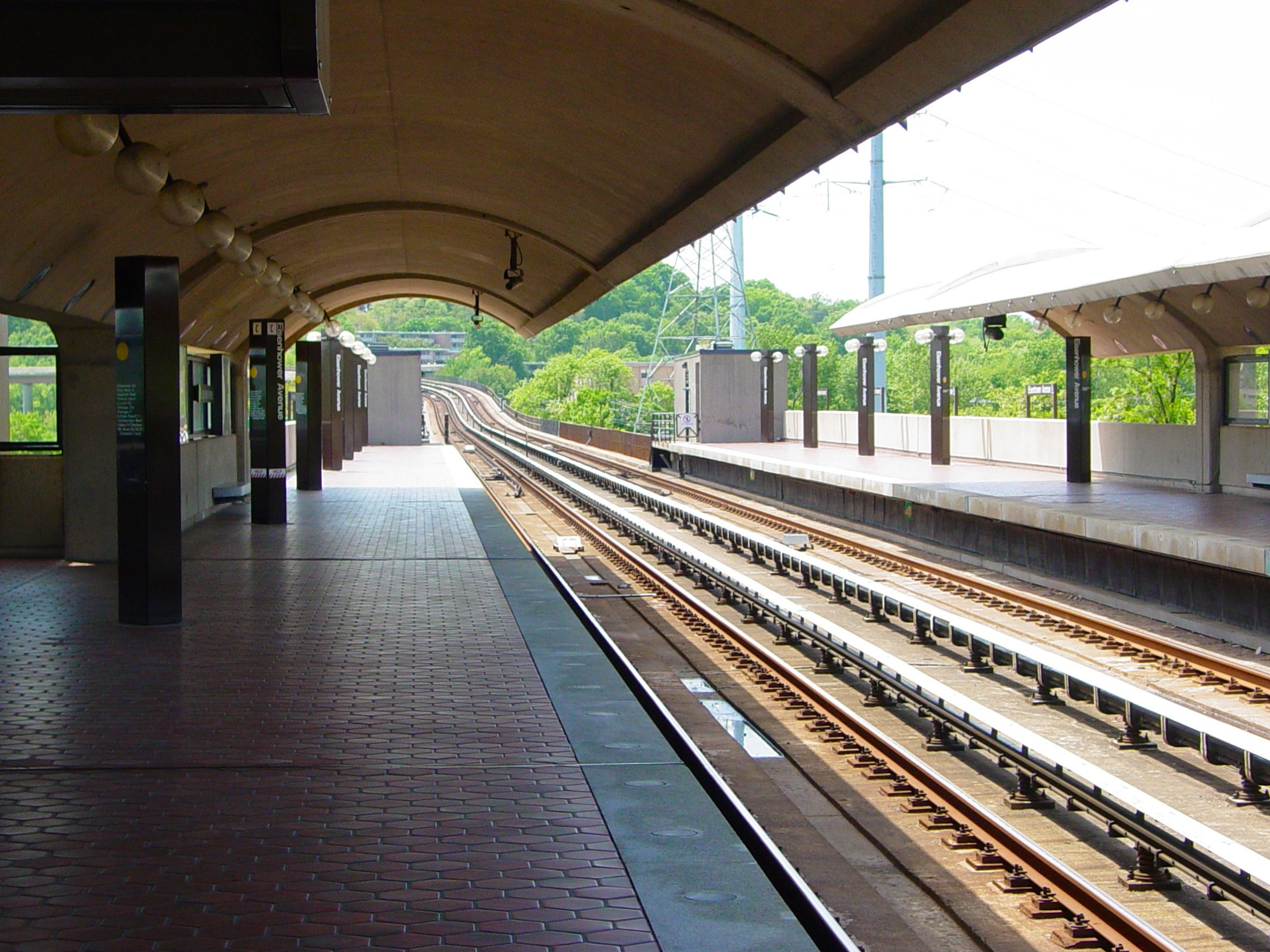
- View of Eisenhower Avenue station platform looking southbound in May 2004

General information
- Location: 2400 Eisenhower Avenue; Alexandria, Virginia
- Owner: Washington Metropolitan Area Transit Authority
- Platforms: 2 side platforms
- Tracks: 2
- Connections: Metrobus: F1X, P90; DASH: 32

Construction
- Structure type: Elevated
- Cycle facilities: 10 racks, 6 lockers
- Accessible: yes

Other information
- Station code: C14

History
- Opened: December 17, 1983; 42 years ago
- Rebuilt: 2019

Passengers
- 2025: 1,865 (average weekday)
- Rank: 81 of 98

Services
Preceding station	Washington Metro	Following station
Huntington Terminus	Yellow Line	King Street–Old Town toward Mount Vernon Square or Greenbelt
Former services
Preceding station	Washington Metro	Following station
Huntington Terminus	Blue Line	King Street–Old Town toward New Carrollton
Route map
Location

Eisenhower Avenue station is a rapid transit station on the Yellow Line of the Washington Metro in Alexandria, Virginia. It opened on December 17, 1983.

== Location ==
The station is located at Eisenhower Avenue near Stovall Street, next to the Capital Beltway and the Hoffman Town Center entertainment complex. The station provides connections to Metro's Richmond Highway Express (F1X) bus service and the DASH bus service operated by the city of Alexandria.

=== Notable places nearby ===
- Albert V. Bryan US Courthouse
- American Trucking Association
- Capital Beltway
- National Science Foundation
- Strayer University (Alexandria Campus)
- United States Patent and Trademark Office

== History ==
Originally scheduled to open in summer 1982, its opening was delayed due to both unavailability of new subway cars and the lack of a test track. Construction of the station was complete by summer 1982, and in September 1983 Metro announced the station would open that December as the new cars would be ready for service. The station opened on December 17, 1983. Its opening coincided with the completion of 4.2 miles (6.8 km) of rail between the National Airport and Huntington stations and the opening of the Braddock Road, Huntington, and King Street–Old Town stations.

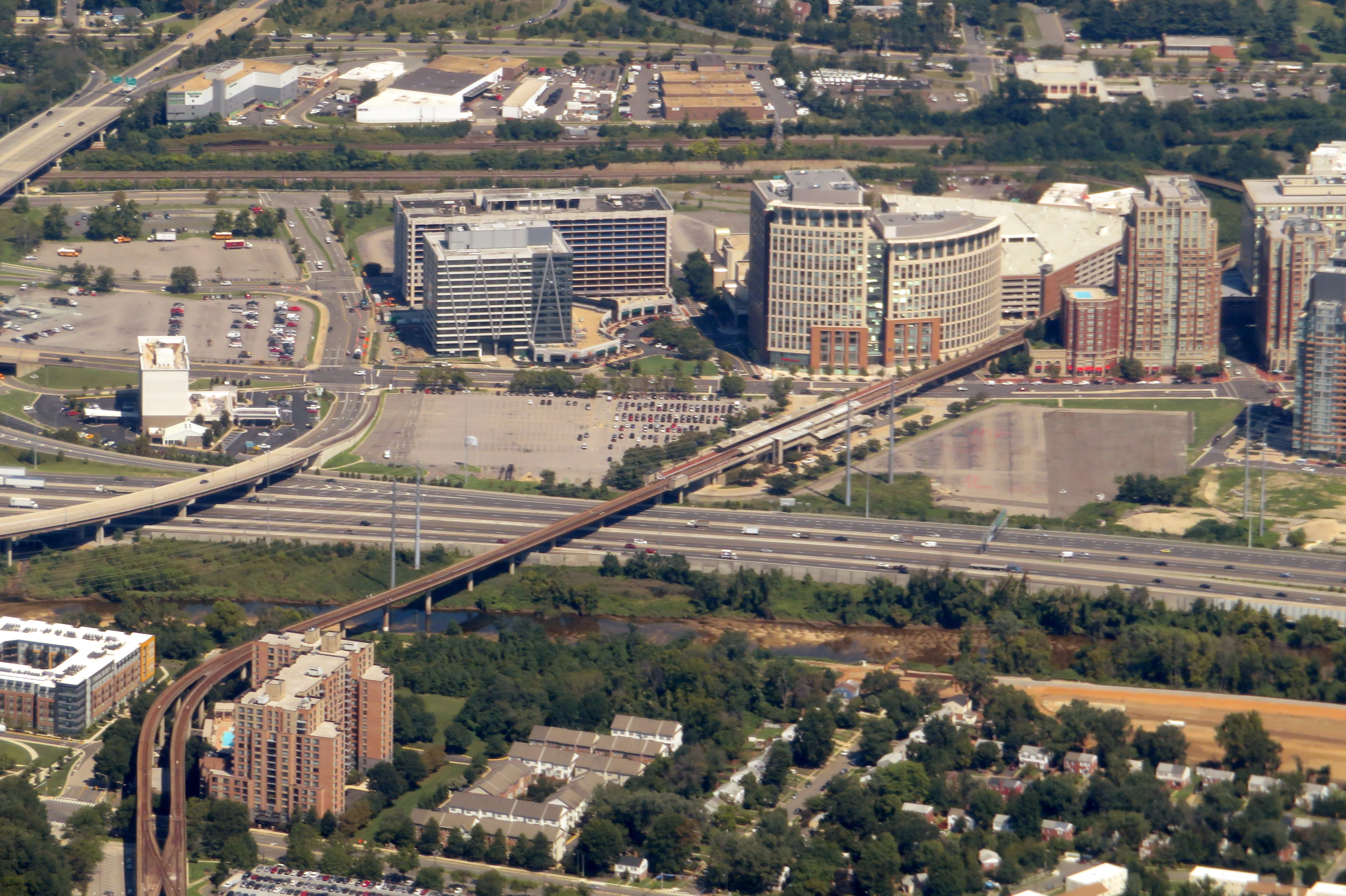
Aerial View of the station in September 2018

In May 2018, Metro announced an extensive renovation of platforms at twenty stations across the system. The Blue and Yellow Lines south of Ronald Reagan Washington National Airport station, including the Eisenhower Avenue station, would be closed from May to September 2019, during which the platforms at this station would be rebuilt.

From March 26, 2020 until June 28, 2020, this station was closed due to the 2020 coronavirus pandemic.

Between September 10, 2022, and November 5, 2022, Eisenhower Avenue was closed due to the Potomac Yard station tie-in, closing all stations south of Ronald Reagan Washington National Airport station. Shuttle buses were provided throughout the shutdown. Additionally, beginning on November 6, 2022, Blue Line trains began serving Eisenhower Avenue due to the suspension of the Yellow Line from the 14th Street Bridge project. Trains operated between Huntington and New Carrollton stations until May 7, 2023, when service on the Yellow Line resumed but truncated from its northeastern terminus from Greenbelt to Mount Vernon Square.

== Station layout ==
Eisenhower Avenue station is one of only two elevated side-platformed stations in the Metro system (the other being West Hyattsville). Access to each platform is provided by a pair of escalators and an elevator. It is also one of only two stations that are serviced exclusively by the Yellow Line, the other being Huntington.

T Platform level	Side platform
T Platform level	Northbound	← toward Greenbelt (King Street–Old Town)
T Platform level	Southbound	→ toward Huntington (Terminus)
T Platform level	Side platform
S	Street level	Exit/entrance, buses, fare gates, ticket machines, station manager
