= Blue Line (Washington Metro) =

Washington Metro rapid transit line

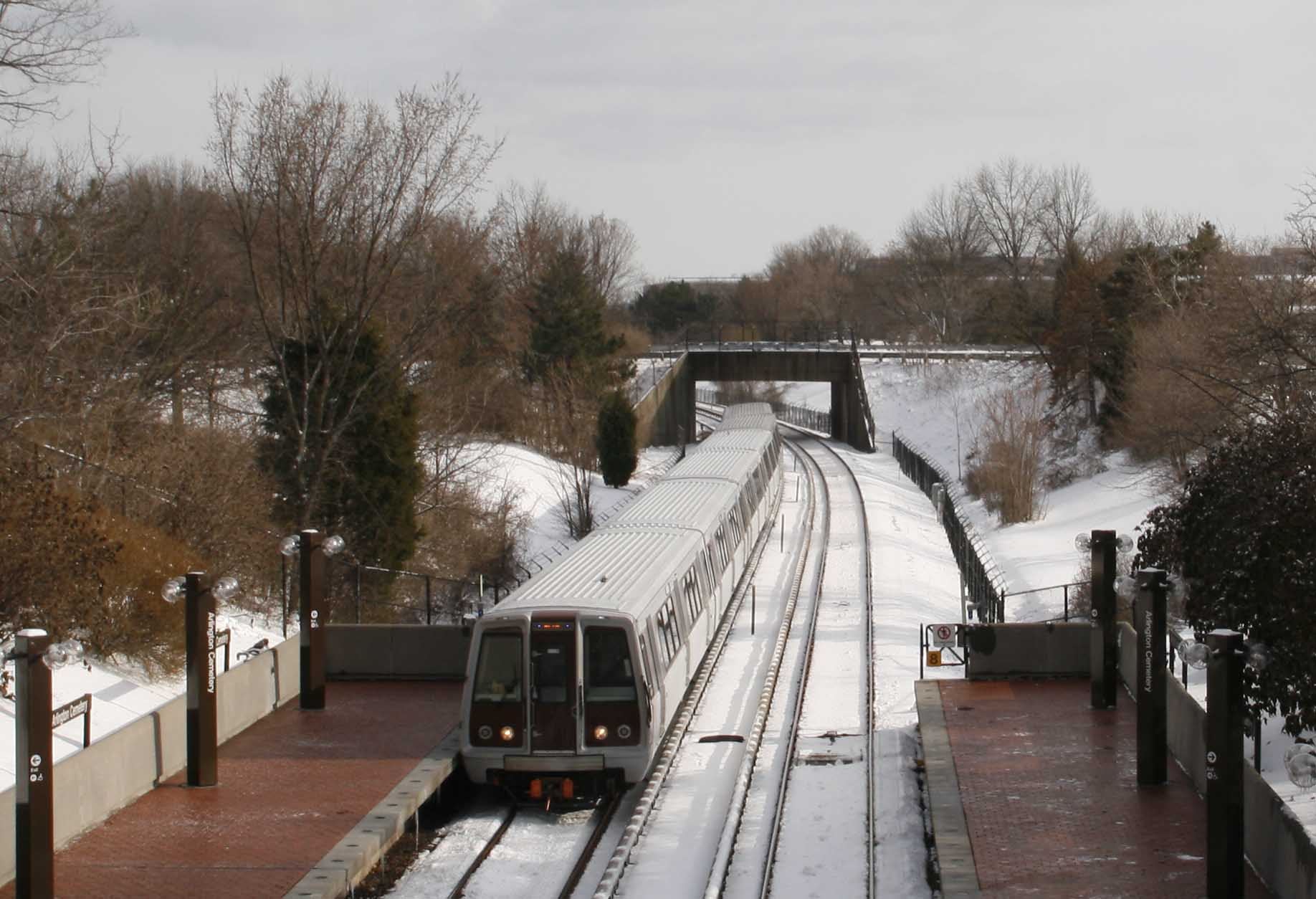
- Blue Line train at Arlington Cemetery in 2009

Overview
- Status: Operating
- Locale: Fairfax County, VA; Alexandria, VA; Arlington, VA; Washington, D.C. Prince George's County, MD, U.S.
- Termini: Franconia-Springfield; Downtown Largo
- Stations: 28

Service
- Type: Rapid transit
- System: Washington Metro
- Operator: Washington Metropolitan Area Transit Authority
- Rolling stock: 3000-series, 6000-series, 7000-series

History
- Opened: July 1, 1977

Technical
- Line length: 30.3 mi (48.8 km)
- Number of tracks: 2
- Character: At-grade, elevated, and underground
- Track gauge: 4 ft 8 1/4 in (1,429 mm)
- Electrification: Third rail, 750 V DC
Route map
Blue Line highlighted in blue

Washington Metro system map

The Blue Line is a rapid transit line of the Washington Metro system, consisting of 28 stations in Fairfax County, Alexandria and Arlington, Virginia; Washington, D.C.; and Prince George's County, Maryland, United States. The Blue Line runs from Franconia–Springfield to Downtown Largo. The line shares track with the Orange Line for 13 stations, the Silver Line for 18, and the Yellow Line for six on the same segment and seven altogether. Only three stations (Franconia–Springfield, Van Dorn Street, and Arlington Cemetery) are exclusive to the Blue Line.

Trains run every 10 minutes during weekday rush hours, every 12 minutes during weekday off-peak hours and weekends, and every 15 minutes daily after 9:30pm.

== History ==
Planning for Metro began with the Mass Transportation Survey in 1955, which attempted to forecast both freeway and mass transit systems sufficient to meet the needs of 1980. In 1959, the study's final report included two rapid transit lines that anticipated downtown Washington subways. Because the plan called for extensive freeway construction in Washington, D.C., alarmed residents lobbied for federal legislation creating a moratorium on freeway construction through July 1, 1962. The National Capital Transportation Agency's 1962 Transportation in the National Capital Region report anticipated much of the present Blue Line route in Virginia with the route following the railroad right-of-way inside Arlington and Alexandria to Springfield. It did not include a route in Prince George's County. The route continued in rapid transit plans until the formation of WMATA.

With the formation of WMATA in October 1966, planning of the system shifted from federal hands to a regional body with representatives of Washington, D.C., Maryland, and Virginia. Congressional route approval was no longer a key consideration. Instead, routes had to serve each local suburban jurisdiction to assure that they would approve bond referendums to finance the system.

The Virginia portion of the Blue Line took much of its present form along the Richmond, Fredericksburg and Potomac Railroad right-of-way to Colchester, as construction along existing right-of-way is the least expensive way to build into the suburbs. A surface-level section of the Blue Line that parallels Virginia State Route 110 where passing Arlington National Cemetery and traveling between The Pentagon and Rosslyn replaced a section of the closed Rosslyn Connecting Railroad, a subsidiary of the Pennsylvania Railroad. The railroad's predecessor, the Washington Southern Railway, constructed the section in 1896 within the grade of the old disused Alexandria Canal.

In March 1968, the WMATA board approved its 98-mile (158 km) Adopted Regional System (ARS), which included the Blue Line from Huntington to Addison Road, with a possible extension to Largo. The ARS contained a Blue Line/Orange Line station at Oklahoma Avenue between Stadium/Armory and the Anacostia River Bridge. Residents objected to a proposed 1,000-car commuter parking lot at that station and the traffic it would generate in the neighborhood. In reaction to their lobbying, the DC government insisted that the station be removed, and the tunnel for the line be extended through the neighborhood. This then made the line the only one to have a station canceled due to neighborhood opposition. To be constructed as an above ground station in the parking lot north of RFK Stadium near Oklahoma Avenue, the station was canceled saving Metro $12 million and the alignment of the line was shifted slightly to the east to address neighbor concerns. To better accommodate tourists, a Smithsonian station exit was added to the Mall, and the federal government requested in 1972 that the Arlington Cemetery station be added to the Blue Line. The federal government paid the cost of both design changes.

Service on the Blue Line began on July 1, 1977, on 18 stations between National Airport in Crystal City and Stadium–Armory in Washington, the first link of the Metro to Virginia. The line was extended by three stations to Addison Road on November 22, 1980. Service south of National Airport began on June 15, 1991, when Van Dorn Street opened. The original plan for the line was completed when this link was extended to Franconia–Springfield on June 29, 1997. Two new stations in Maryland – Morgan Boulevard and Largo Town Center (now Downtown Largo) – opened on December 18, 2004.

From its opening on November 20, 1978, until December 11, 1979, the Orange Line was co-aligned with the Blue Line from National Airport to Stadium-Armory, with the Orange Line continuing east from Stadium-Armory to New Carrollton. Beginning December 1, 1979, the Orange Line diverged westward from Rosslyn to Ballston–MU when that extension opened. The Blue and Orange Lines remain co-aligned from Rosslyn to Stadium-Armory and the Silver Line is co-signed along the same route as well.

The Blue Line was originally planned to follow a slightly different route. The plan would have sent Blue Line trains to Huntington, with Yellow Line trains serving Franconia–Springfield. This was changed due to a shortage of rail cars at the time of the completion of the line to Huntington. Because fewer rail cars were required to operate the Yellow Line service than would be required to run the Blue Line service out to Huntington, the line designations were switched due to the Yellow Line's shorter route. From 1999 to 2008, the Blue Line operated to Huntington on July 4, as part of Metro's special Independence Day service pattern.

The ARS had the Blue Line end at Addison Road. However, sports fans continually argued for a three-mile (4.8 km) extension to the Capital Centre sports arena in Largo, Maryland. On February 27, 1997, the WMATA board approved the construction of the extension. By the time the extension opened in 2004, professional basketball and hockey had relocated to a new arena atop the Gallery Place station, and the Capital Centre was replaced with a shopping mall. However, the extension still drew considerable sports spectator traffic because it is within walking distance of the FedExField football stadium. The extension cost $456 million.

In 1998, Congress changed the name of the Washington National Airport station to Ronald Reagan Washington National Airport, with the law specifying that no money be spent to implement the name change. As a result, WMATA did not change the name of the National Airport station (which never included the full name of the airport). In response to repeated inquiries from Republican congressmen that the station be renamed, WMATA stated that stations are renamed only at the request of the local jurisdiction. Because both Arlington County and the District of Columbia were controlled by Democrats, the name change was blocked. Not until 2001 did Congress make changing the station's name a condition of further federal funding.

In May 2018, Metro announced an extensive renovation of platforms at twenty stations across the system. Blue and Yellow Lines south of Ronald Reagan Washington National Airport would be closed from May to September 2019, the most extended line closure in Metro's history to accommodate these platform reconstructions. All trains terminated at Ronald Reagan Airport as a result.

From March 26, 2020 until June 28, 2020, trains were bypassing Van Dorn Street, Arlington Cemetery, Federal Triangle, Smithsonian, Federal Center SW, and Morgan Boulevard stations due to the 2020 coronavirus pandemic. All stations (except Arlington Cemetery) reopened beginning on June 28, 2020. Arlington Cemetery station was later reopened on August 23, 2020.

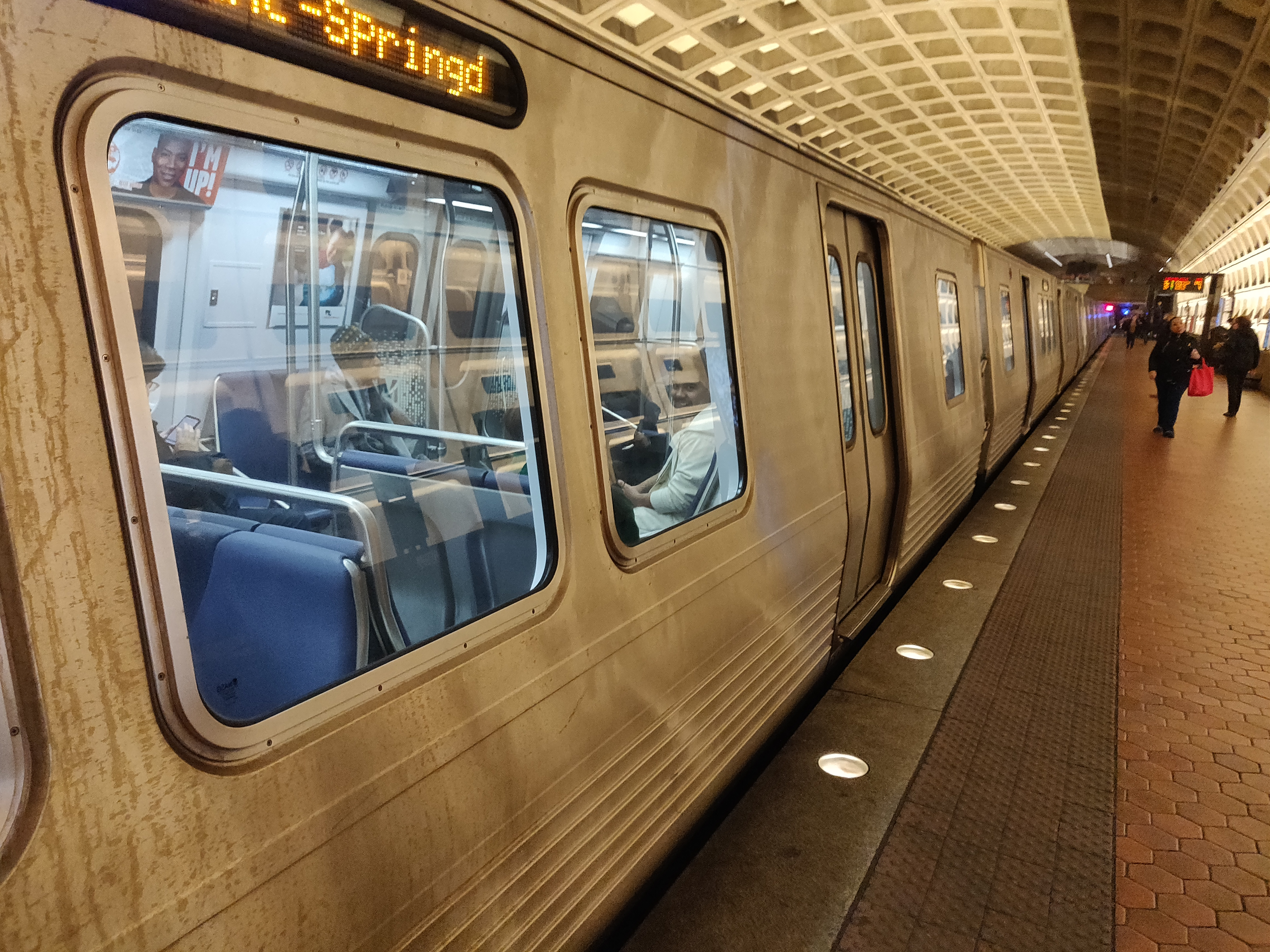
Franconia-bound Blue Line train serving Farragut West in December 2019

Beginning on November 27, 2020, until March 14, 2021, Blue Line trains began serving Huntington and Eisenhower Avenue stations during most weekends due to Metro modernizing the signal system at Alexandria Rail Yard causing both Franconia–Springfield and Van Dorn Street stations to be closed. Additionally, trains operated to Huntington between December 20, 2020, and January 3, 2021, due to a complete closure at Alexandria Rail Yard. Metro chose to do a total shutdown instead of single tracking because completing the same work with weekend single tracking could more than double the time for completion while providing severely limited rail service with waits of up to 36 minutes between trains. However work was completed three weeks earlier.

On December 14, 2020, WMATA announced that Blue Line service will be suspended between February 13 to May 23, 2021, to rebuild the platforms at both Arlington Cemetery and Addison Road. Additional Yellow Line trains will operate between Franconia–Springfield and Mount Vernon Square while Silver Line trains will serve in part of the Blue Line.

On June 15, 2022, WMATA announced that an additional Blue Line service called the Blue Plus will operate between Huntington and New Carrollton stations beginning on September 10, 2022, due to the 14th Street Bridge shutdown that suspended all Yellow Line service until May 7, 2023. The Yellow Line resumed service on this date, but with its northeastern terminus truncated from Greenbelt to Mount Vernon Square.

On November 16, 1995, WMATA and the developer of the Potomac Yard area of Alexandria, Virginia, signed an agreement to construct a new station between Braddock Road and National Airport that the developer will finance. The Federal Transit Administration, in cooperation with WMATA, the National Park Service and The City of Alexandria government, completed an environmental impact statement for the project in June 2016. The station opened on May 19, 2023. Automatic train operation on the Blue and Orange lines, which had ceased following the 2009 Red Line train collision, was allowed to resume in June 2025.

== Route ==
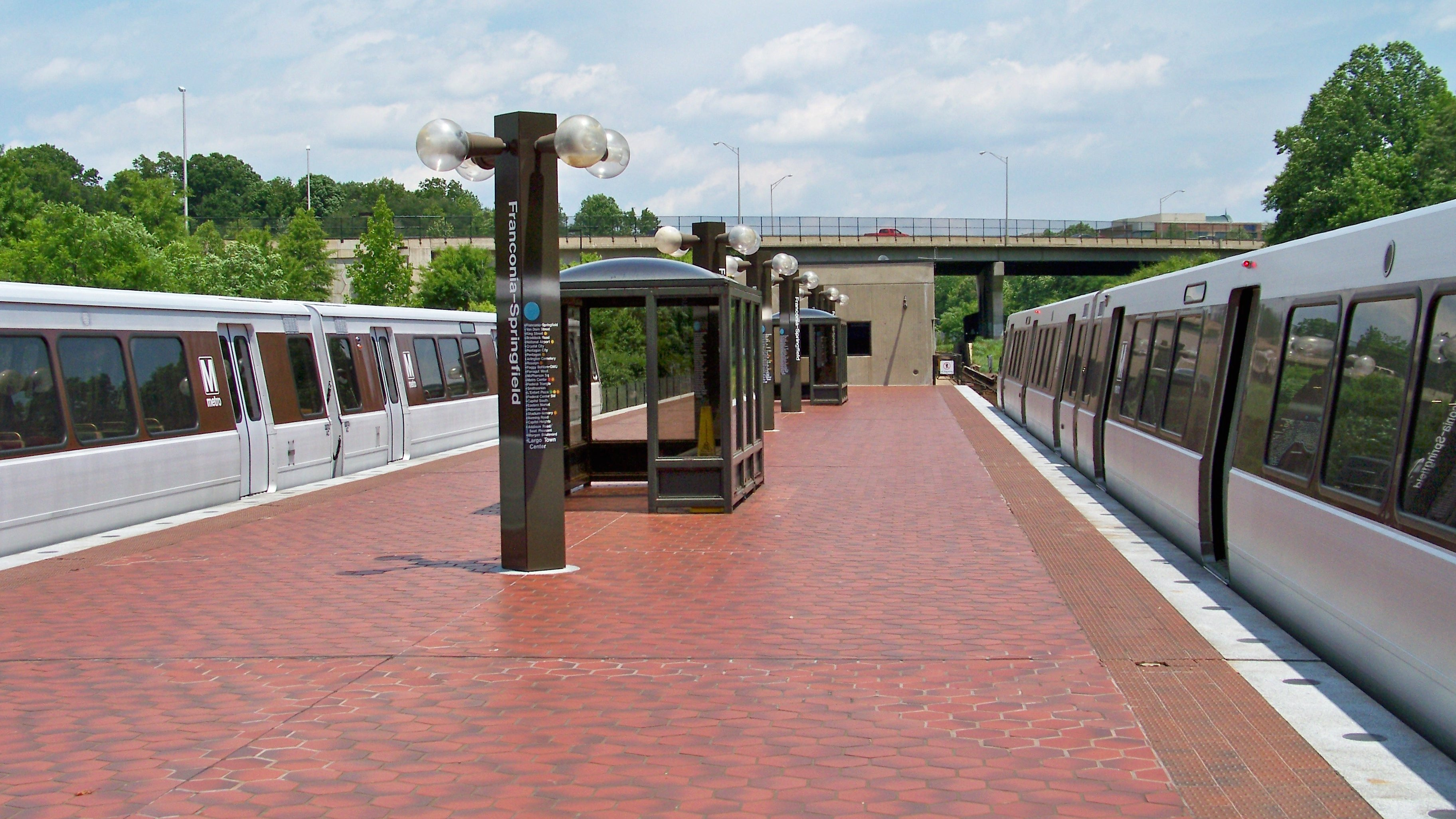
Franconia–Springfield, the southwestern terminal of the line

The southwestern terminal of the Blue Line is the Franconia–Springfield located at the intersection of Frontier Drive and the Franconia-Springfield Parkway (Virginia Route 289). The line travels above ground along the CSX right of way, where it joins the Yellow Line just south of King Street in Old Town Alexandria. The joint line continues north along the CSX Railroad until it curves to the east on an elevated bridge adjacent to the National Airport terminal. The Blue Line (along with the Yellow Line) then enters a subway tunnel under 15th Street South in Crystal City and bends north under Hayes Street and then The Pentagon parking lots. The Blue Line separates from the Yellow Line in this tunnel and emerges on surface tracks that parallel Virginia Route 110 and serve Arlington Cemetery before entering a tunnel south of Rosslyn, where it merges with the Orange Line and Silver Line. The tunnel travels under North Lynn Street and then the Potomac River, where it bends east and travels under I Street NW. There is a non-revenue branch track on the westbound track that connects to the Northwest bound track before Farragut North on the Red Line between the Farragut West and McPherson Square stations. The tunnel bends south under 12th Street NW and crosses underneath the Red Line at the Metro Center station. The tunnel then turns east under D Street SW, passing under the Green and Yellow Lines at the L'Enfant Plaza station. The tunnel continues east under Pennsylvania Avenue SE, G Street SE, and Potomac Avenue SE. The Blue Line (along with the Orange and Silver lines) bends north under 19th Street SE and transitions to an elevated line in the Robert F. Kennedy Memorial Stadium parking lot near Oklahoma Avenue NE. The Blue Line (along with the Orange and Silver Lines) crosses the Anacostia River on a bridge adjacent to Benning Road NE near RFK Stadium. At this point, the Blue and Silver Lines stay together but both would proceed to part ways with the Orange Line and enters a tunnel under Benning Road and East Capitol Street. The Blue Line (along with the Silver Line) become a surface or elevated route with short tunnels parallel to Central Avenue from Addison Road to the Eastern terminal at Largo, where it ends adjacent to the parking lots of "The Blvd" shopping center.

In terms of WMATA's internal route designations, the Blue Line service travels along the entirety of the J Route (from the terminus at Franconia-Springfield to the C & J junction just south of King Street), part of the C Route (from the C & J junction just south of King Street to Metro Center), part of the D Route (from Metro Center to the D & G Junction just east of Stadium-Armory) and the entire G Route (from the D & G junction past Stadium-Armory to the terminus at Largo Town Center). The Blue Line needs 23 six-car trains (138 rail cars) to run at peak capacity.

== Rush Plus ==
On June 18, 2012, Metro initiated its "Rush+" service plan, which had been under consideration for some time. This plan was intended to clear congestion at Rosslyn, where the Blue and Orange lines meet and ultimately prepare the tracks to accommodate the Silver Line. Under the plan, Blue Line trains continued on the usual route but some Yellow Line trains originated at Franconia–Springfield and were routed over the Fenwick Bridge to Greenbelt. During rush hour, there were fewer Blue Line trains on the tracks which could mean potentially increased wait times for regular Blue Line customers. Furthermore, some Orange Line trains were routed to Largo Town Center until the Silver Line opened in July 2014.

== Future ==
A second improvement project involves building a pedestrian tunnel to interconnect the Gallery Place station with Metro Center. A July 2005 study proposed connecting the eastern mezzanine of Metro Center with the western mezzanine of Gallery Place that are only one block apart. The proposed connection would reduce the number of passengers that use the Red Line to transfer between the Yellow Line and the Blue and Orange lines at Metro Center. As of 2011, the project remained unfunded.

In addition, a transportation planning group has proposed an extension of the Blue Line that would reach Potomac Mills in Prince William County.

== Stations ==
The following stations are along the line, from southwest to east:

Station	Code	Opened	Image	Bus Connections	Connections
Franconia–Springfield	J03	June 29, 1997		Fairfax Connector: 231, 232, 301, 305, 308, 310, 321, 322, 334, 335, 340, 341, 350, 351, 352, 353, 371, 401/402, 494, 670; PRTC OmniRide: Prince William Metro Express	Virginia Railway Express: ■ Fredericksburg Line
Van Dorn Street	J02	June 15, 1991		MetroBus: A27, A29; DASH: 30, 32, 35; Fairfax Connector: 109, 231, 232, 321, 322	
King Street–Old Town	C13	December 17, 1983		MetroBus: A71, F1X, F20, F23, F24, P90; DASH: 30, 31, 32, 33, 102, King Street Trolley	Yellow Line; Amtrak (at Alexandria Union Station); Virginia Railway Express (at Alexandria Union Station)
Braddock Road	C12	December 17, 1983		MetroBus: A11, A12, A1X; DASH: 30, 31, 34, 103, 104	Yellow Line
Potomac Yard	C11	May 19, 2023		MetroBus: A1X, A70; DASH: 33, 34, 36A/B	Yellow Line
National Airport	C10	July 1, 1977		No Bus Connections	Yellow Line
Crystal City	C09	July 1, 1977		MetroBus: A11, A1X, A40; ART: 43; Fairfax Connector: 598, 599	Yellow Line; Virginia Railway Express (at Crystal City)
Pentagon City	C08	July 1, 1977		MetroBus: A11, A1X, A27, A40, A66, F44; ART: 42, 74, 84, 87; Fairfax Connector: 598, 599	Yellow Line
Pentagon	C07	July 1, 1977		Metrobus: A11, A25, A27, A28, A66, A90, F28, F44, F81, F83, F85; ART: 42, 87, 87X; Fairfax Connector: 306, 393, 394, 395, 396, 598, 599, 698, 834, 835	Yellow Line
Arlington Cemetery	C06	July 1, 1977		No Bus Connections	
Rosslyn	C05	July 1, 1977		MetroBus: A58, A76, F62; ART: 45, 55, 56	Orange Line; Silver Line
Foggy Bottom–GWU	C04	July 1, 1977		MetroBus: A58, C85, D10, D20, D74, D80, D82	Orange Line; Silver Line
Farragut West	C03	July 1, 1977		MetroBus: A49, A58, D10, D20, D70, D72, D80, D82, D94, F19	Orange Line; Silver Line; Red Line (at Farragut North)
McPherson Square	C02	July 1, 1977		MetroBus: A29, A49, D10, D20, D24, D36, D50, D5X, D60, D6X, D72, D80, D94	Orange Line; Silver Line
Metro Center	C01	July 1, 1977		MetroBus: A29, A49, D10, D20, D24, D30, D32, D34, D36, D44, D5X, D60, D6X, D94	Red Line; Orange Line; Silver Line
Federal Triangle	D01	July 1, 1977		MetroBus: D10, D1X, D30, D32, D44, D60, D6X	Orange Line; Silver Line
Smithsonian	D02	July 1, 1977		MetroBus: D50	Orange Line; Silver Line
L'Enfant Plaza	D03	July 1, 1977		MetroBus: A40, C11, C55, D30, D40, D50, D60	Yellow Line; Green Line; Orange Line; Silver Line; Virginia Railway Express (at L'Enfant)
Federal Center SW	D04	July 1, 1977		MetroBus: D10, D1X	Orange Line; Silver Line
Capitol South	D05	July 1, 1977		MetroBus: D10, D1X	Orange Line; Silver Line
Eastern Market	D06	July 1, 1977		MetroBus: C53, C55, D10, D1X	Orange Line; Silver Line
Potomac Avenue	D07	July 1, 1977		MetroBus: C15, C37, C41, C51, D10, D1X	Orange Line; Silver Line
Stadium–Armory	D08	July 1, 1977		MetroBus: C41, C51	Orange Line; Silver Line
Benning Road	G01	November 22, 1980		MetroBus: C21, C23, C37, C57, D24, D2X	Silver Line
Capitol Heights	G02	November 22, 1980		MetroBus: C31, C57, D2X, P63; GoPGC: P65	Silver Line
Addison Road	G03	November 22, 1980		MetroBus: P60, P62, P63; GoPGC: P43, P54, P56, P76	Silver Line
Morgan Boulevard	G04	December 18, 2004		MetroBus: P61, P63; GoPGC: P56	Silver Line
Downtown Largo (Note: Originally opened as Largo Town Center. Changed in 2022)	G05	December 18, 2004		MetroBus: P41, P63, P72, P73; GoPGC: P44, P52, P56, P57, P5X, P64	Silver Line

== Bibliography ==
- Schrag, Zachary (2006). The Great Society Subway: A History of the Washington Metro. Baltimore, MD: Johns Hopkins University Press. ISBN 0-8018-8246-X.
