= Virginia State Route 400 =

State highway in Alexandria, Virginia, US

State Route 400
- Washington Street

Route information
- Maintained by VDOT
- Length: 1.79 mi (2.88 km)
- Existed: early 1980s–present

Major junctions
- South end: George Washington Parkway in Alexandria
- SR 236 in Alexandria; SR 7 in Alexandria
- North end: George Washington Parkway in Alexandria

Location
- Country: United States
- State: Virginia
- Counties: City of Alexandria

Highway system
- Virginia Routes; Interstate; US; Primary; Secondary; Byways; History; HOT lanes
← SR 399	→ SR 401

State Route 400 (SR 400) is a primary state highway in the U.S. state of Virginia. Locally known as Washington Street, the state highway runs 1.79 miles (2.88 km) from the south city limit of the independent city of Alexandria, Virginia north to 1st Street, still within Alexandria. SR 400 is a city street connection through Old Town Alexandria between the two segments of George Washington Memorial Parkway, one heading south toward Mount Vernon and one heading north toward District of Columbia. The Virginia Department of Transportation assigned the unsigned SR 90005 designation to run concurrently along the entire length of the parkway and of SR 400.

== Route description ==
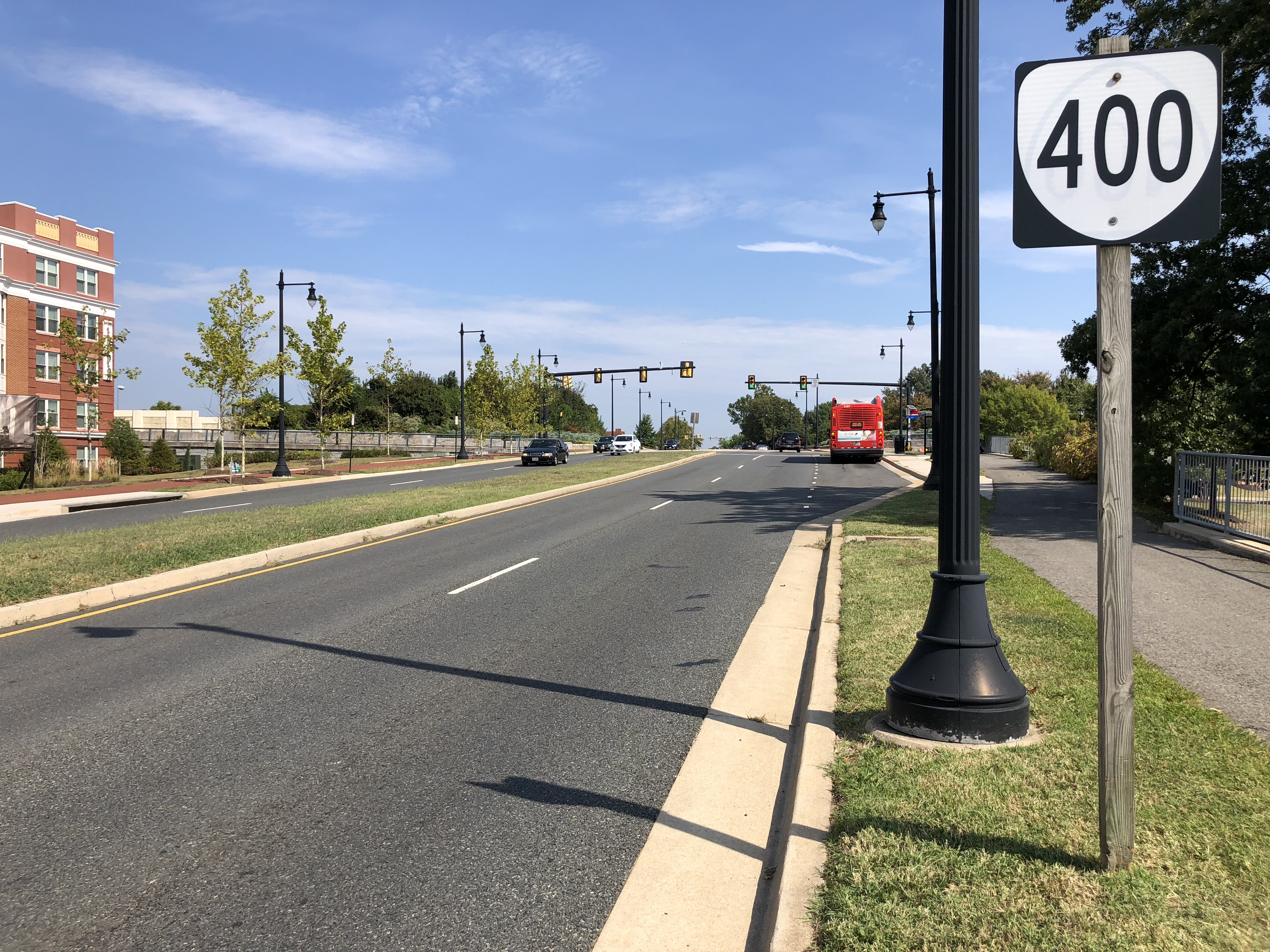
View north near the south end of SR 400 at the George Washington Memorial Parkway at the south city limit of Alexandria

SR 400 begins at the south city limit of Alexandria at Hunting Creek. The highway continues south into Fairfax County and Belle Haven as the George Washington Memorial Parkway toward Mount Vernon. SR 400 is a four-lane divided highway through the Jones Point neighborhood before becoming undivided and crossing over the Capital Beltway (I-95 and I-495) on a freeway cap, a very wide overpass that shields the freeway from view of the crossing highway, between the Woodrow Wilson Bridge over the Potomac River and the Capital Beltway's interchange with U.S. Route 1 (US 1). The first intersection north of the bridge is with Church Street, which receives a ramp from the westbound Capital Beltway. SR 400 continues through Old Town Alexandria with six lanes and passes the Davis Chapel. The state highway meets the eastern ends of SR 236 (Duke Street) and SR 7 (King Street) in the Alexandria Historic District, where the Lyceum and Beulah Baptist Church line the southbound side of the street and the statue Appomattox lies in the middle of the street at its intersection with Prince Street. SR 400 continues north past the Christ Church, the Lloyd House, and the Lee-Fendall House to its northern terminus at First Street. George Washington Memorial Parkway resumes at this intersection and continues toward Arlington and Washington.

== History ==
Most of SR 400, from Franklin Street to Powhatan Street, was once part of US 1, and the present alignment (roughly) of US 1 was then US 1 Truck.

== Major intersections ==
The entire route is in Alexandria.

mi	km	Destinations	Notes
0.00	0.00	George Washington Parkway south – Mount Vernon	Continuation south
0.91	1.46	SR 236 west (Duke Street)	Eastern terminus of SR 236
1.07	1.72	SR 7 west (King Street)	Eastern terminus of SR 7
1.79	2.88	George Washington Parkway north – Washington	Continuation north
1.000 mi = 1.609 km; 1.000 km = 0.621 mi
