= Route 7 BRT =

Proposed bus route in Virginia, United States

Overview
- Status: proposed

Route
- Route type: Bus rapid transit
- Locale: Alexandria, Falls Church, and Fairfax County, Virginia
- Communities served: Tysons, Falls Church, Seven Corners, Bailey's Crossroads, Skyline City
- Landmarks served: Spring Hill station, Tysons station, West Falls Church station, East Falls Church station, Seven Corners transit center, Bailey's Crossroads, Mark Center
- Start: Spring Hill
- End: Mark Center
- Length: 11 mi (18 km)
- Stations: 21

Service
- Level: Daily
- Daily ridership: 9,500 (projected)

Route 7 BRT is a proposed 11 miles (18 km) bus rapid transit line between the Spring Hill Washington Metro station and Mark Center. It would serve the cities of Alexandria and Falls Church, as well as Fairfax County, Virginia.

== Route ==
The bus route is being proposed by the Northern Virginia Transportation Commission to alleviate congestion along the corridor. It would primarily run along Route 7 in Alexandria, Falls Church, and Tysons Corner. The proposed alignment would also connect to the East Falls Church station. The 11 mile route is projected to have a daily ridership of 9,500 passengers. Most of the bus route would be along a bus-only lane, but it would travel in mixed traffic in certain sections of route 7. Fairfax County will study widening part of Route 7 to accommodate dedicated bus lanes. Phase three of the project, which will identify eminent domain issues, started in June 2018.

The bus would also use the proposed West End Transitway in parts of Alexandria
