= Beulah Baptist Church =

Historic church in Virginia, United States

- Beulah Baptist Church (Alexandria, Virginia)
- U.S. National Register of Historic Places
- Virginia Landmarks Register
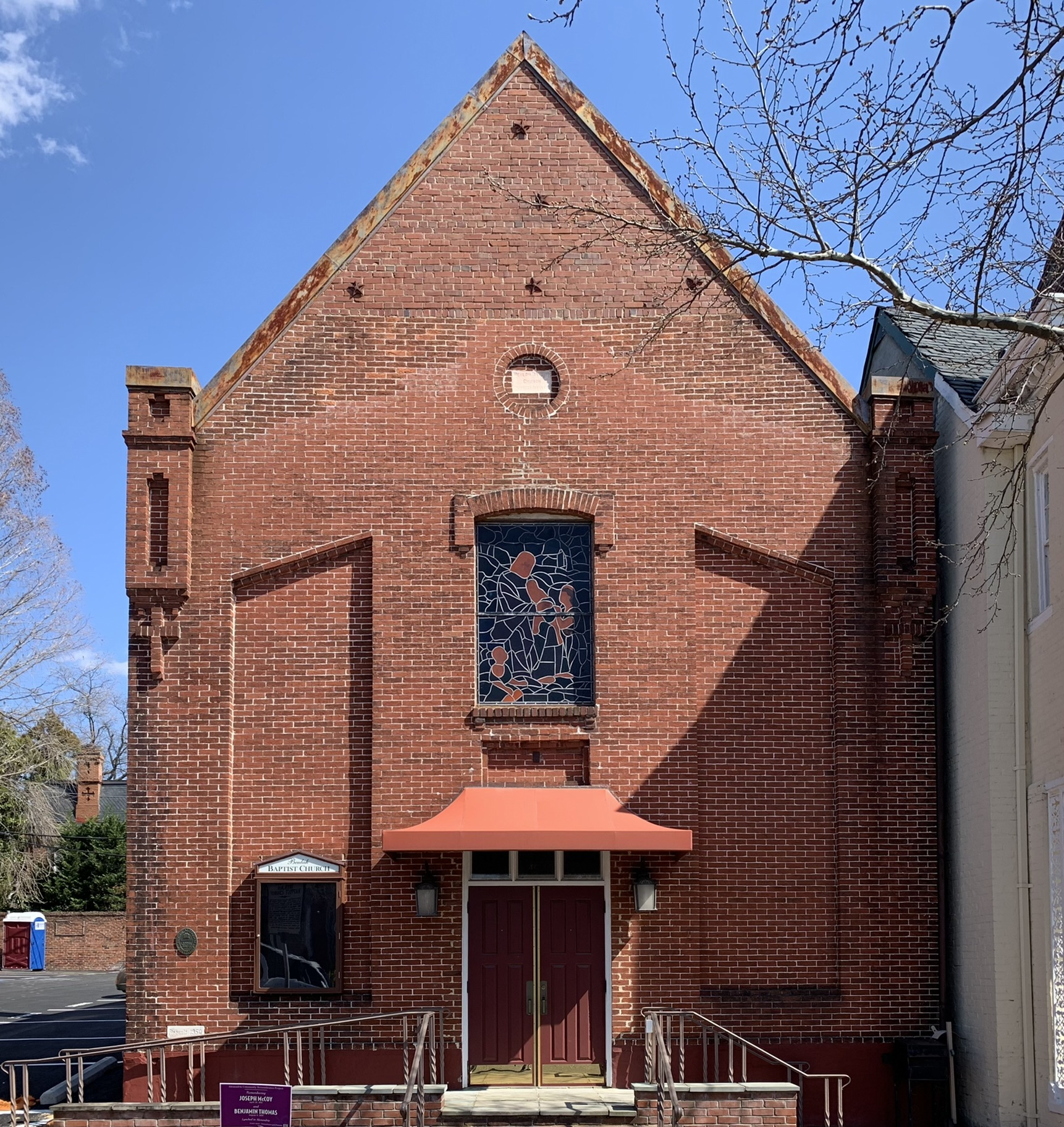
- Façade of Beulah Baptist Church in 2022

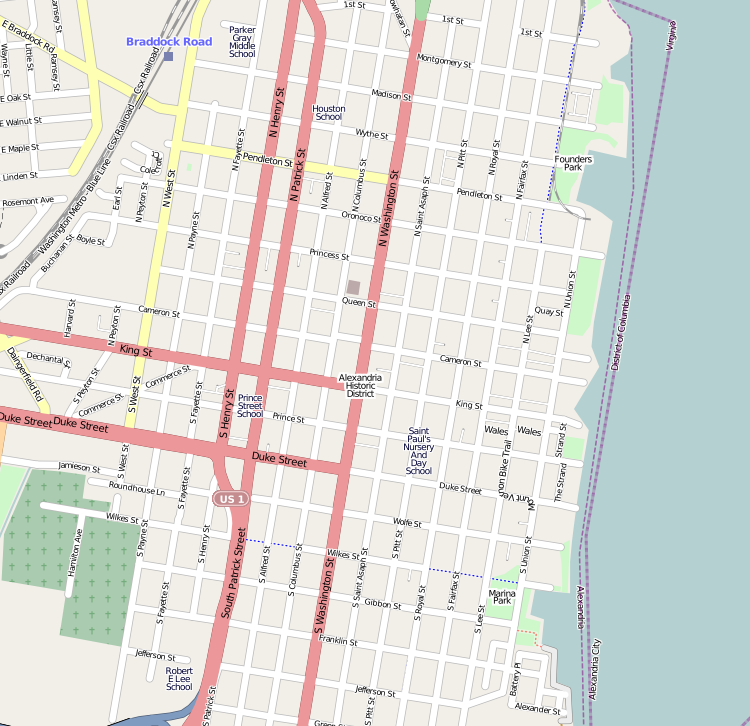
- Location within Alexandria Historical District Location within Virginia Location within the United States
- Location: 320 S. Washington Street, Alexandria, Virginia
- Coordinates: 38°48′14″N 77°2′51″W
- Built: 1863
- Architectural style: mid-19th Century Revival
- MPS: African American Historic Resources of Alexandria, Virginia MPS
- NRHP reference No.: 03001424
- VLR No.: 100-5015-0002

Significant dates
- Added to NRHP: January 16, 2004
- Designated VLR: September 10, 2003

Beulah Baptist Church is a predominantly Black Baptist Church at 320 S. Washington Street in Old Town Alexandria, Virginia. The historic building is a two-story brick structure with a gable roof and large stained glass window. Built in 1863, it was sandwiched between the two Black neighborhoods of 'the Hill' and 'the Bottoms'. (Note: .For more on the historic Black neighborhoods of Alexandria, see Courageous Journey, page 16ff.) The church was added to the National Register of Historic Places in 2004.

Beulah was the first of ten Black churches established in Alexandria following the town's occupation by Union troops in 1861. (Note: The Black churches founded during and after the Civil War include Beulah Baptist, 1863; Zion Baptist, 1864; Shiloh Baptist, around 1863; Third Baptist Church, 1865; Meade Memorial, 1869; Ebenezer Baptist, 1881; Good Shepard Episcopal Chapel, 1883; Mt. Jezreel, 1890; Oakland Baptist, 1891; and St. Joseph Catholic, 1916. See Alexandria African American Resources. Two other Black churches had been founded in Alexandria before the Civil War. Alfred Street Baptist Church dates from 1806. Roberts Memorial United Methodist Church dates from 1834.) The church's first pastor, Rev. Clem Robinson, had established "The First Select Colored School" in 1861 for Contraband refugees arriving in Alexandria. The following year Robinson, together with Dye Carter, selected a parcel on South Washington Street to build their new church, and Carter oversaw construction of the building. The contraband school soon moved to that location and continued operating after the war.

== History ==
Rev. Clem Robinson had been born in Brunswick County, Virginia, but moved to Pennsylvania where he received both a collegiate and religious education at Ashmun Institute (now Lincoln University) and began a teaching career. It had been against the law in Virginia since the 1830's to educate Black Americans, both enslaved and free. It was also forbidden for educated African Americans to come into the state. It was not until Alexandria's occupation by Federal troops at the start of the Civil War in May 1861, that Robinson felt it was safe to return to Virginia. At that time Alexandria was being overwhelmed with contraband refugees fleeing slavery in the Confederacy.

With support from the American Baptist Free Mission Society of New York and the (Northern) American Baptist Home Mission Society, Rev. Robinson and his wife came to Alexandria and worked with Rev. George Washington Parker and Miss Amanda Borden to found several schools for contraband refugees. One of these, "The First Select Colored School," served over 700 students in its first year. Other schools which they founded included a night school for adults and a "Normal and Theological Institute" for those with some education. These schools preceded the federal schools, set up by the Freedman's Bureau, by many months.

In the early days, Rev. Robinson taught upper-level students at the "Beulah Normal and Theological Institute" with the aim of educating future teachers and preachers for the Black community. Classes met at the church and had over 80 students in the first few years, both men and women. The school placed over 30 missionaries and educators into the field. (Note: This pioneering effort preceded other Black Normal and Theological Institutes during the Reconstruction period, including Wayland Seminary (later Virginia Union, 1865), Fisk University (1866) Howard University (1867), and the Hampton Institute (1868).) Robinson and Parker also assisted the efforts of other pioneers for Black education in Alexandria, including Harriet Jacobs and Julia Wilbur. Robinson's school remained in place until 1870, when Alexandria opened its public school system.

In addition to its role in educating recently freed African Americans, Beulah Baptist provided a supportive environment as the contraband refugees adjusted to their new life in freedom with shelter, work, and clothing.

As the Civil War continued, the church building was used as a hospital to care for the wounded in this city on the front lines of the war. And when the federal government confiscated all lands within the Confederate states (including Virginia), Beulah Baptist saw both its property and its new church building seized and returned to the previous owner. In 1877 Rev. Robinson and the officers were able to repurchase the property for their congregation.

Reverend Clem Robinson served for twelve years, his pastorate was ended in 1875. From 1875 to 2017, twelve other men would take the helm as pastor of the Beulah Baptist Church. The longest-tenured pastor of the church has been Rev. Dr. Columbus Watson who ushered the church into the 21st century and served at Beulah Baptist for 58 years (56 years as Pastor) until his retirement on September 30, 2017. Beulah Baptist is currently pastored by Rev. Quardricos Bernard Driskell.

== Building ==
Built in 1863, Beulah Baptist Church is a front gable-roofed, freestanding brick structure located on South Washington Street, a main thoroughfare in the city. It is one of several significant historic churches on adjacent blocks. The two-story structure's most distinctive features include a large stained-glass window centered on the front facade, large flanking recessed brick panels, and two small decorative brick pinnacles at each corner of the facade.

According to church history, the addition to the rear of the church was built between 1920 and 1923. Further improvements were undertaken in the following decades. The back of the church was rebuilt and the first electric lighting system was installed. A Hook and Hastings pipe organ, which had been given to Beulah by Christ Church Episcopal just up the street, was installed. This organ is still at the church today.

In 1949 the wall on the north side of the church was damaged, however while in the midst of repairing it the south wall fell. Having to move out for repairs, worship services were initially held at the Elk's Home and later at the Seventh Day Adventist Church. Other church programs were held at the First Baptist Church and Third Baptist Church until the basement of the church was reopened in September 1950. The sanctuary was completed in November 1950 and a "Rebuilding Stone" was laid. These repairs are still clearly visible in the different brick colors on the exterior side walls of the church.

== See also ==
- Beulah Baptist Church
- Baptist Church One Hundred Thirtieth Anniversary (October 22, 1993).
- National Register of Historic Places listings in Alexandria, Virginia
