= List of Kennedy Center cancellations during the second Trump administration =

Many performers, artists, and shows cancelled performances, ended working agreements, or otherwise disassociated themselves from the John F. Kennedy Center for the Performing Arts, the national cultural center of the United States, after President Donald Trump in 2025 replaced the center's leaders and its board of trustees, had himself appointed chairman, and began making changes to the center's programming. The Trump administration also forced the cancellation of several shows in 2025.

On February 1, 2026, Trump announced plans to close the Kennedy Center for two years of renovations, beginning on July 4, 2026. The following day, CNN reported that the center's new leaders had been unable to sign enough acts to mount a 2026-27 season.

== Cancellations and withdrawals by artists ==
| Name | Action | Date | Ref. |
|---|---|---|---|
| Issa Rae | Canceled performance | February 13, 2025 | |
| Renée Fleming | Resigned as advisor | February 13, 2025 | |
| Shonda Rhimes | Resigned as trustee | February 13, 2025 | |
| Ben Folds | Resigned as advisor | February 13, 2025 | |
| Low Cut Connie | Canceled performance | February 13, 2025 | |
| Rhiannon Giddens | Canceled performance | February 26, 2025 | |
| Peter Wolf | Canceled performance | March 5, 2025 | |
| Saturday Night Live writer Sylvia Traymore Morrison | Canceled performance | March 5, 2025 | |
| Balún (band) | Canceled performance | March 5, 2025 | |
| Louise Penney | Canceled performance | March 5, 2025 | |
| Amanda Rheaume | Canceled performance | March 5, 2025 | |
| "RIOT! Funny Women Stand Up" annual series | Canceled performances | March 5, 2025 | |
| Alfred Street Baptist Church Choir | Canceled performance | March 5, 2025 | |
| Eureka Day | Canceled performances | March 5, 2025 | |
| Hamilton | Canceled performances | March 6, 2025 | |
| Melissa Errico | Canceled performances | March 6, 2025 | |
| Washington Performing Arts | Moved season of performances | May 22, 2025 | |
| Members of the Les Misérables cast | Withdrew from performances | June 2025 | |
| Stephen Schwartz | Canceled fundraiser | December 2025 | |
| Doug Varone and Dancers | Canceled performance | December 2025 | |
| Kristy Lee | Canceled performance | December 19, 2025 | |
| American College Theatre Festival | Suspended partnership | December 22, 2025 | |
| Chuck Redd | Canceled performance | December 24, 2025 | |
| The Cookers (feat. Billy Harper) | Canceled performance | December 29, 2025 | |
| Washington National Opera | Withdrew residence | January 9, 2026 | |
| Béla Fleck | Canceled performance | January 7, 2026 | |
| Philip Glass | Canceled performance | January 2026 | |
| Martha Graham Dance Company | Canceled performances | January 2026 | |
| Wayne Tucker | Canceled performances | January 28, 2026 | |
| Brentano Quartet with Hsin-Yun Huang | Canceled performance | January 28, 2026 | |
| Vocal Arts DC | Canceled performances | January 28, 2026 | |
| Sonia De Los Santos | Canceled performances | January 28, 2026 | |
| Magpie | Canceled performance | January 28, 2026 | |
| Maria João Pires with Marc-André Hamelin | Canceled performance | January 28, 2026 | |
| Asian AF | Canceled performances | January 28, 2026 | |
| Seattle Children's Theatre | Canceled performances | January 27, 2026 | |
| Choral Arts Society of Washington | Moved performance | January 31, 2026 | |
| Alvin Ailey American Dance Theater | Moved performances | January 31, 2026 | |
| "Let Freedom Ring!", annual concert organized by Georgetown University | Moved performance | January 31, 2026 | |
| San Francisco Ballet | Canceled performances | February 28, 2026 | |
| New York City Ballet | Canceled performances | March 27, 2026 | |

== Performances cancelled by the Trump administration ==
The Trump administration cancelled several planned performances, including:

| Name | Action | Date | Ref. |
|---|---|---|---|
| Finn | Cancelled performances | February 13, 2025 | |
| Gay Men's Chorus of Washington | Cancelled performance | March 5, 2025 | |
| U.S. Marine Band | Withdrew from performance | February 2025 | |

As of February 2, 2026, no plans had been announced for the performances that had been planned after July 4, when Trump said the center would close for two years of renovations.
