= West End Transitway =

Planned bus transit line in Virginia

Overview
- System: DASH
- Status: proposed
- Began service: 2028 (projected)

Route
- Route type: Bus rapid transit
- Locale: City of Alexandria and Arlington County, Virginia
- Start: Van Dorn Street station
- End: Pentagon station
- Length: 5.3 mi (8.5 km)
- Stations: 15 planned

Service
- Level: Daily
- Timetable: www.alexandriava.gov/WestEndTransitway

The West End Transitway is a proposed 5.3 miles (8.5 km) bus rapid transit (BRT) line between Van Dorn and Pentagon Washington Metro stations. It would serve the City of Alexandria, Virginia, as well as Arlington County, Virginia. The transit is part of a larger project in Alexandria that the city has requested the Northern Virginia Transportation Authority $36 million dollars to fund.

== Route ==
The bus line would primarily run through the West End neighborhood of Alexandria, before making connections both in the urban village of Shirlington, as well as at the Pentagon. The preferred alignment would also connect to Northern Virginia Community College.

The proposed bus line would have both mixed use and dedicated lanes. It would have high-quality bus stations with rider amenities.

== Planning ==
In the Fall of 2016, Alternatives Analysis was done and Environmental Documentation was generated for the project.

The project received $57.2 million in state funding in July 2019. This will allow for street upgrades like sidewalks and bicycle facilities. It will also be put towards the purchase of buses.
