= Alfred Street (disambiguation) =

Alfred Street is a street in Oxford, England.

Alfred Street may also refer to:

- Alfred Street (cricket umpire) (1869–1951), English cricketer and umpire
- Alfred Street Baptist Church, Alexandria, Virginia, US
- Alfred Street, Sydney, Australia
- Alfred Billings Street (1811–1881), American poet
