= Virginia State Route 420 =

State highway in Alexandria, Virginia, US

State Route 420

Route information
- Maintained by VDOT
- Length: 2.75 mi (4.43 km)
- Existed: mid-1980s–present

Major junctions
- West end: I-395 in Alexandria
- SR 402 in Alexandria
- East end: SR 7 in Alexandria

Location
- Country: United States
- State: Virginia
- Counties: City of Alexandria

Highway system
- Virginia Routes; Interstate; US; Primary; Secondary; Byways; History; HOT lanes
← SR 419	→ US 421

State Route 420 (VA 420) is an unsigned primary state highway in the U.S. state of Virginia. The state highway is known as Seminary Road and Janney's Lane on its 2.75-mile (4.43 km) course from Interstate 395 (I-395) east to VA 7 within the independent city of Alexandria.

== Route description ==
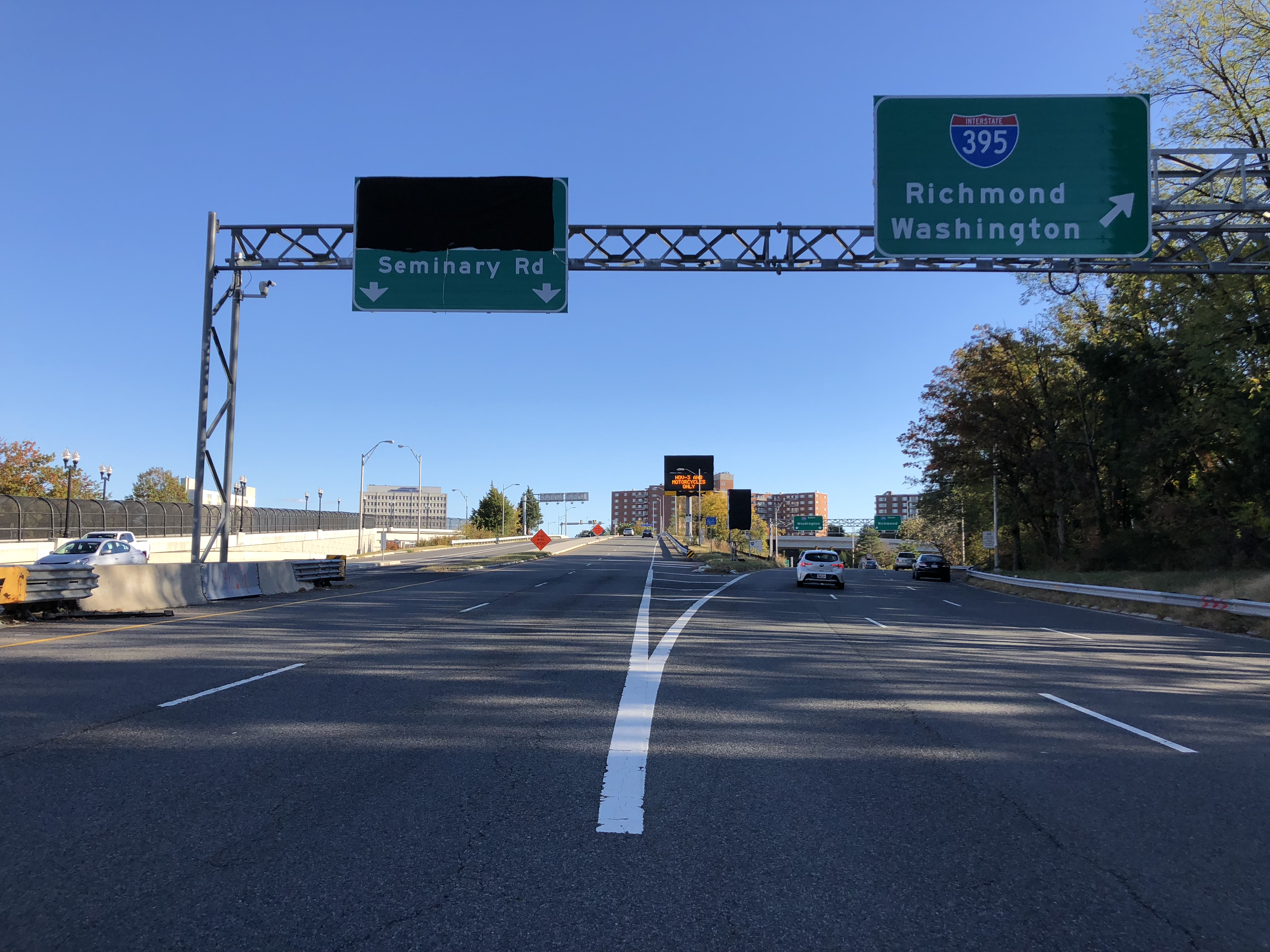
View south at the north end of SR 420 at I-395

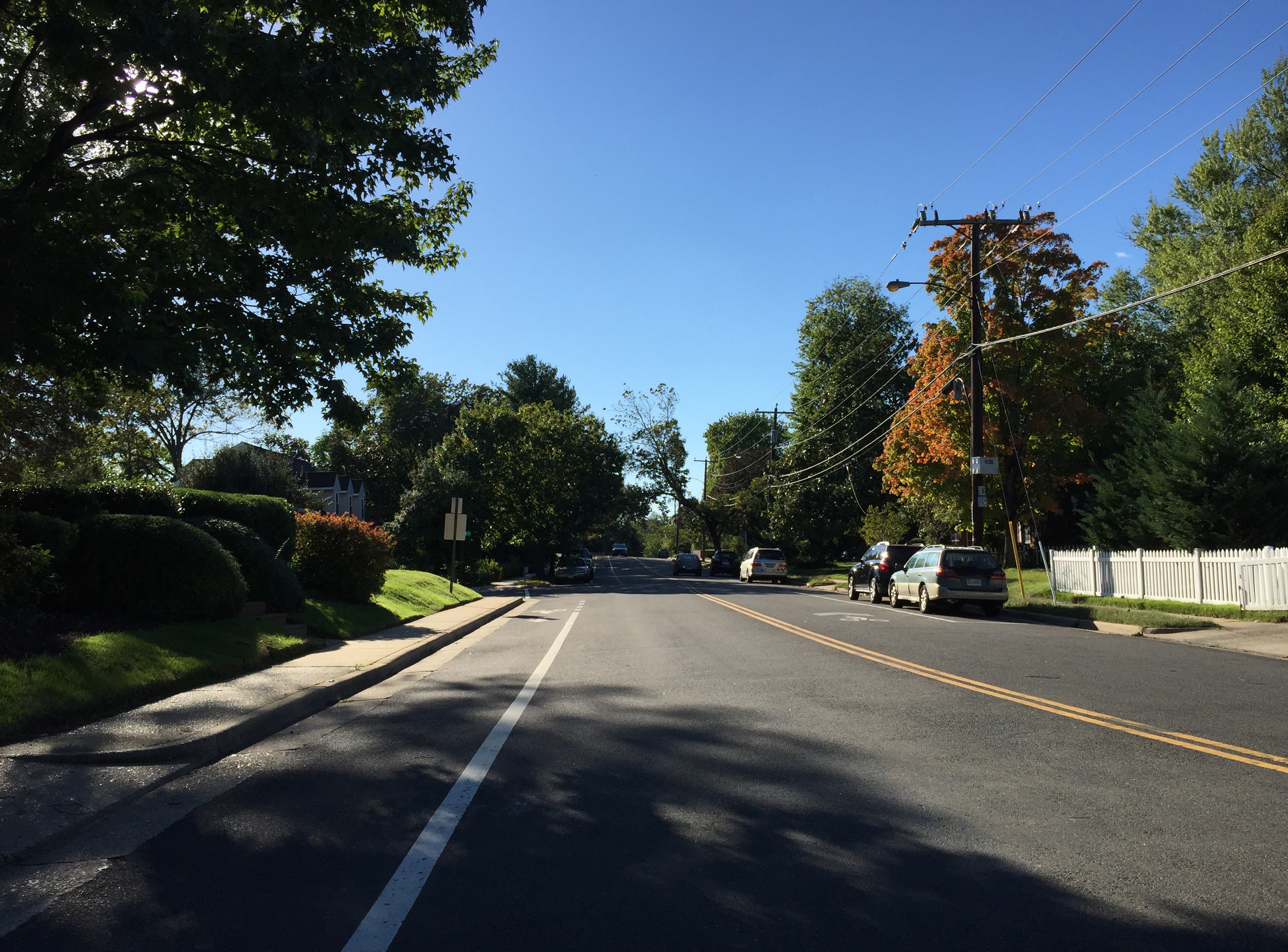
View west at the east end of SR 420 at SR 7 in Alexandria

SR 420 begins at a three-level diamond interchange with I-395 (Henry G. Shirley Memorial Highway). The roadway continues west as an unnumbered segment of Seminary Road that passes by the Mark Center Building, a massive office building for the United States Department of Defense, on its way to Bailey's Crossroads. SR 420, which begins as a four-lane divided highway, crosses over the northern terminus of SR 401 (Van Dorn Street) immediately to the east of the I-395 interchange. Access to SR 401 is provided via a pair of right-in/right-out intersections with Kenmore Avenue. SR 420 reduces to a four-lane undivided street that passes by Inova Alexandria Hospital, after which it again narrows to a two-lane road with a center left-turn lane. The state highway passes its namesake, the Virginia Theological Seminary, just west of its intersection with Quaker Lane, which heads north as SR 402. SR 420 continues east as Janneys Lane, a two-lane undivided street that passes to the north of the Gerald R. Ford Jr. House on its way to its eastern terminus at SR 7 (King Street).

== History ==
SR 420 was assigned to its present location, previously unnumbered, in the mid-1980s. However, as it was once part of Fairfax County, the Seminary Road portion of SR 420 was numbered SR 716 until it was annexed by Alexandria in the 1950s.

== Major intersections ==
The entire route is in Alexandria.

mi	km	Destinations	Notes
0.00	0.00	I-395 (Henry G. Shirley Memorial Highway) / Seminary Road west – Washington, Richmond	Exit 4 (I-395); western terminus
		Kenmore Avenue to SR 401 (Van Dorn Street)	Right-in/right-out intersections with Kenmore Avenue
1.72	2.77	SR 402 north (Quaker Lane) / Quaker Lane south	
2.75	4.43	SR 7 (King Street)	Eastern terminus
1.000 mi = 1.609 km; 1.000 km = 0.621 mi
