= Virginia State Route 402 =

State highway in Alexandria, Virginia, US

State Route 402
- Quaker Lane

Route information
- Maintained by VDOT
- Length: 1.65 mi (2.66 km)
- Existed: early 1980s–present

Major junctions
- South end: SR 420 in Alexandria
- SR 7 in Alexandria
- North end: I-395 in Alexandria

Location
- Country: United States
- State: Virginia
- Counties: City of Alexandria

Highway system
- Virginia Routes; Interstate; US; Primary; Secondary; Byways; History; HOT lanes
| ← SR 401 | → SR 403 |

State Route 402 (SR 402) is a primary state highway in the U.S. state of Virginia. Known as Quaker Lane, the state highway runs 1.65 miles (2.66 km) from SR 420 north to Interstate 395 at Shirlington Circle within the independent city of Alexandria.

== Route description ==
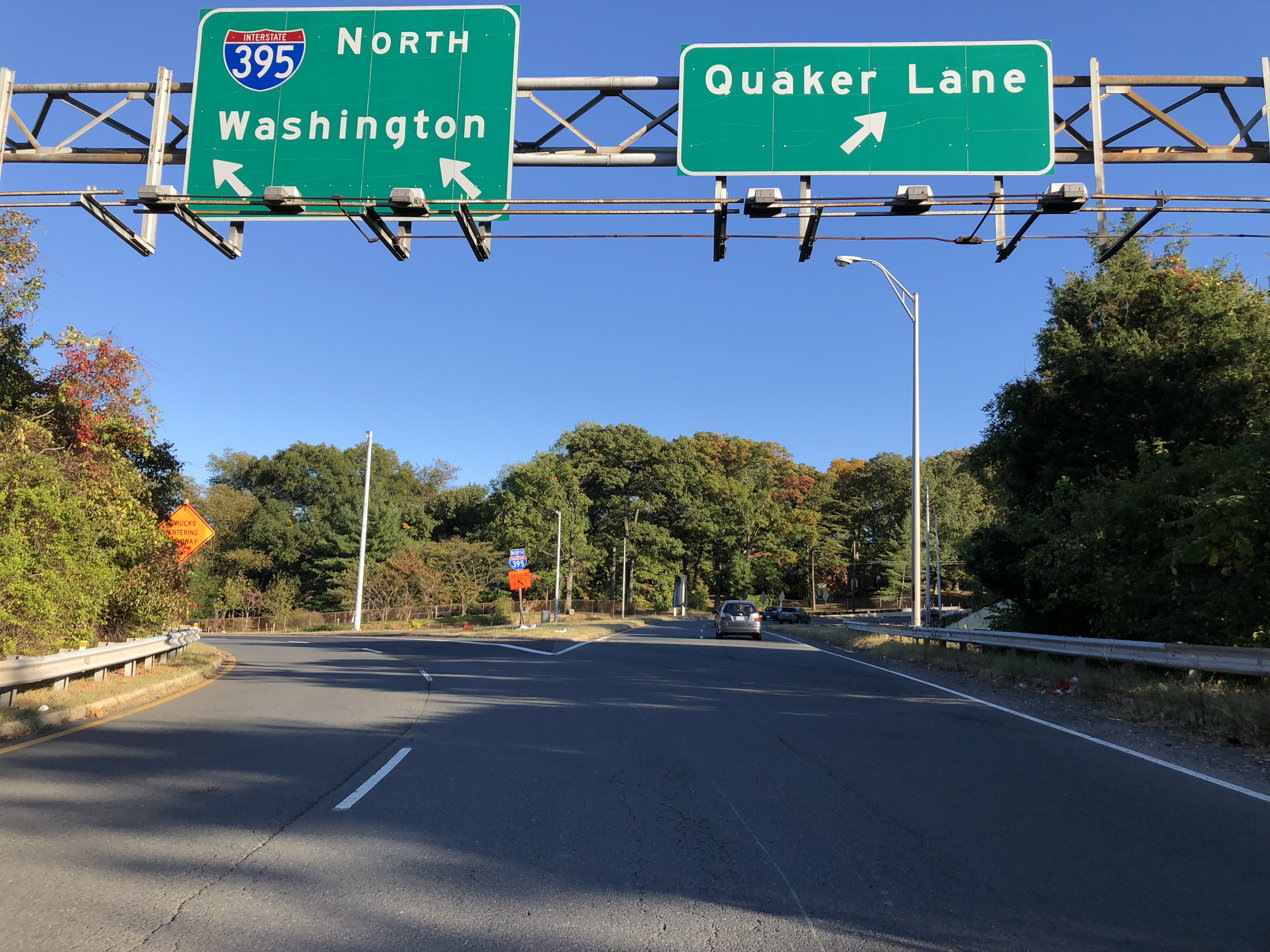
View south at the north end of SR 402 at I-395 on the border of Arlington and Alexandria

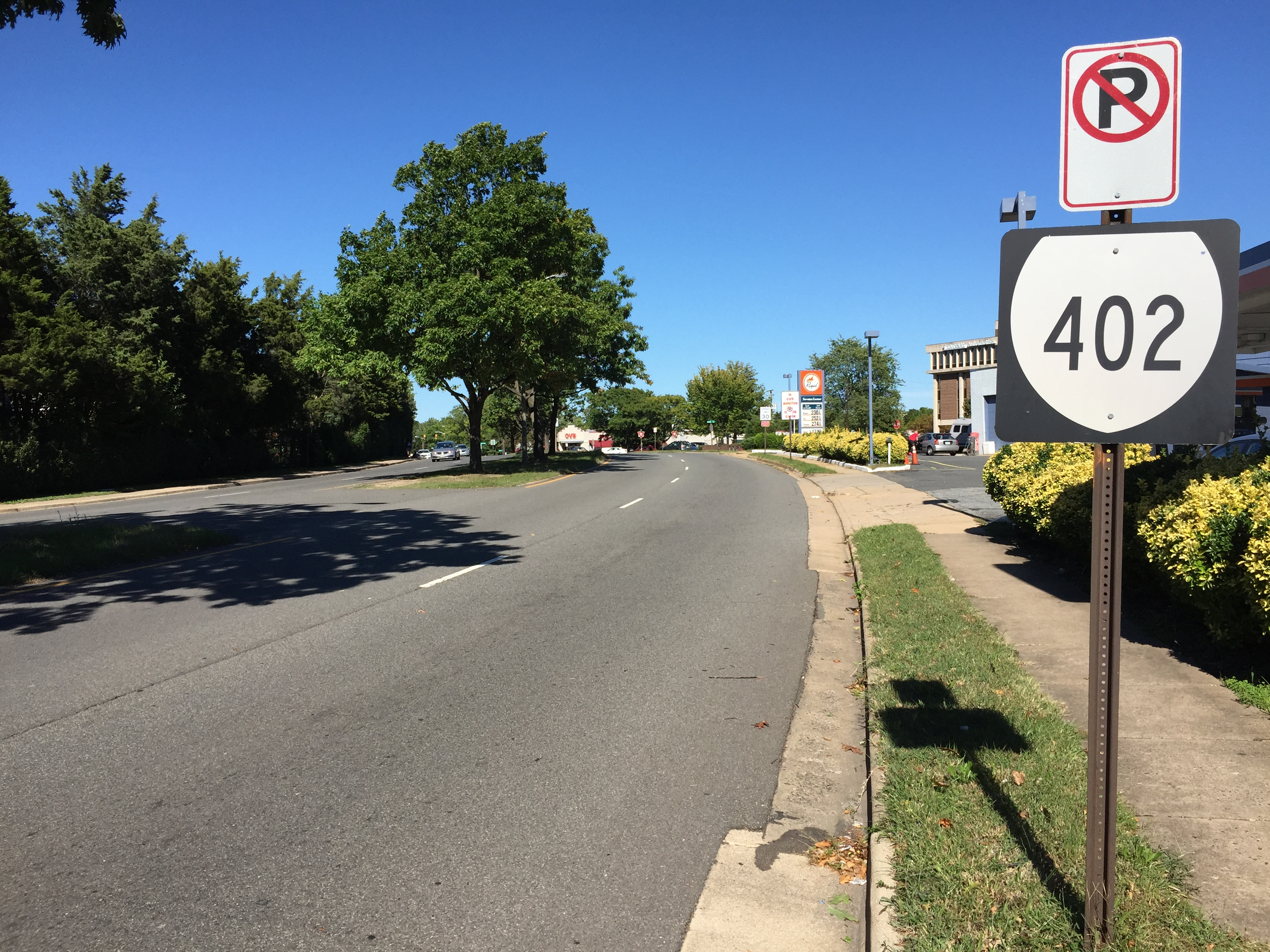
View north along SR 402 just north of SR 7 in Alexandria

SR 402 begins at an intersection with SR 420, which heads west as Seminary Road and east as Janneys Lane. Quaker Lane continues south as an unnumbered street past the Clarens mansion to SR 236 (Duke Street). SR 402 heads north as a four-lane undivided highway that passes to the east of the Virginia Theological Seminary and Episcopal High School. The state highway intersects northwest–southeast SR 7 (King Street) and east–west Braddock Road at a triangular six-way intersection; each street intersects the two other streets for a total of three intersections. North of SR 7, SR 402 becomes a divided highway and passes between the Parkfairfax and Fairlington neighborhoods. The state highway's northern terminus is at Shirlington Circle, a roundabout interchange with I-395 (Henry G. Shirley Memorial Highway) on the boundary between the city of Alexandria and Arlington County. The roundabout also includes right-in/right-out intersections with Gunston Road in Alexandria and Campbell Avenue in Arlington, which provides access to The Village at Shirlington commercial area, which includes the Signature Theatre. North of the roundabout interchange, the highway continues north as Shirlington Road through the Shirlington neighborhood of Arlington.

== History ==
The section of Quaker Lane north of SR 7 (King Street) was originally known as Seminary Road. SR 402 was assigned to its present location, previously unnumbered, in the early 1980s.

== Major intersections ==
The entire route is in Alexandria.

| mi | km | Destinations | Notes |
|---|---|---|---|
| 0.00 | 0.00 | SR 420 (Seminary Road/Janneys Lane) / Quaker Lane south | Southern terminus |
| 0.69 | 1.11 | SR 7 (King Street) / Braddock Road | |
| 1.65 | 2.66 | I-395 (Henry G. Shirley Memorial Highway) / Shirlington Road – Washington, Richmond | Shirlington Circle; Exit 6 (I-395); northern terminus |
1.000 mi = 1.609 km; 1.000 km = 0.621 mi

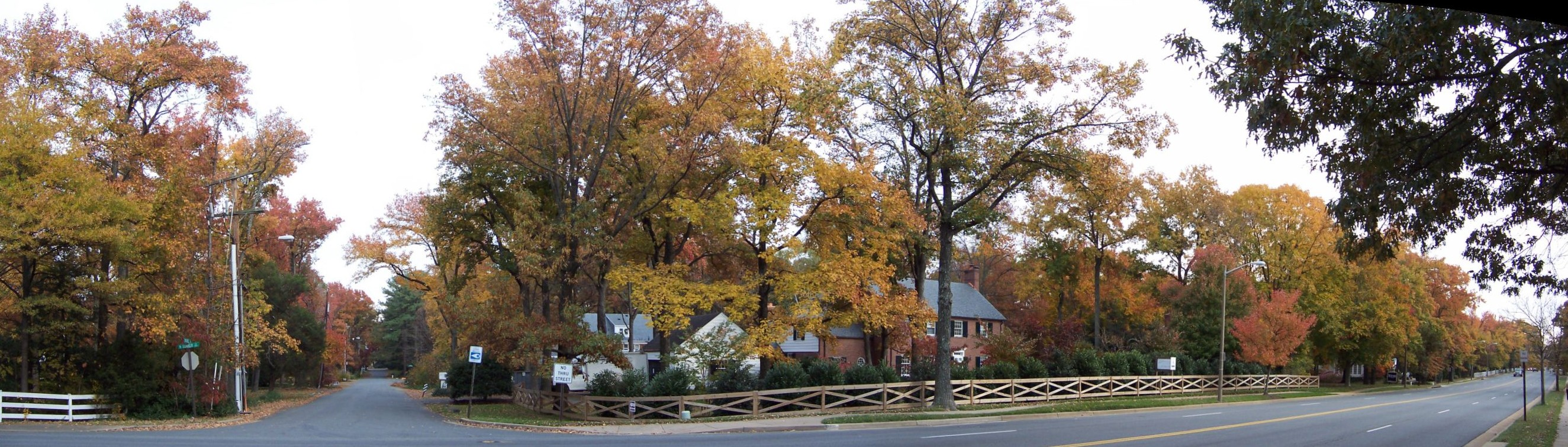
Quaker Lane south of King Street
