= Virginia State Route 401 =

State highway in Alexandria, Virginia, US

State Route 401
- Van Dorn Street

Route information
- Maintained by VDOT
- Length: 2.61 mi (4.20 km)
- Existed: early 1980s–present

Major junctions
- South end: SR 613 at south city limit of Alexandria
- SR 236 in Alexandria
- North end: SR 420 in Alexandria

Location
- Country: United States
- State: Virginia
- Counties: City of Alexandria

Highway system
- Virginia Routes; Interstate; US; Primary; Secondary; Byways; History; HOT lanes
← SR 400	→ SR 402

State Route 401 (SR 401) is a primary state highway in the U.S. state of Virginia. Known as Van Dorn Street (Lincolnia Road until 1953), the state highway runs 2.61 miles (4.20 km) from SR 613 at the south city limit of the independent city of Alexandria north to SR 420 within Alexandria.

== Route description ==
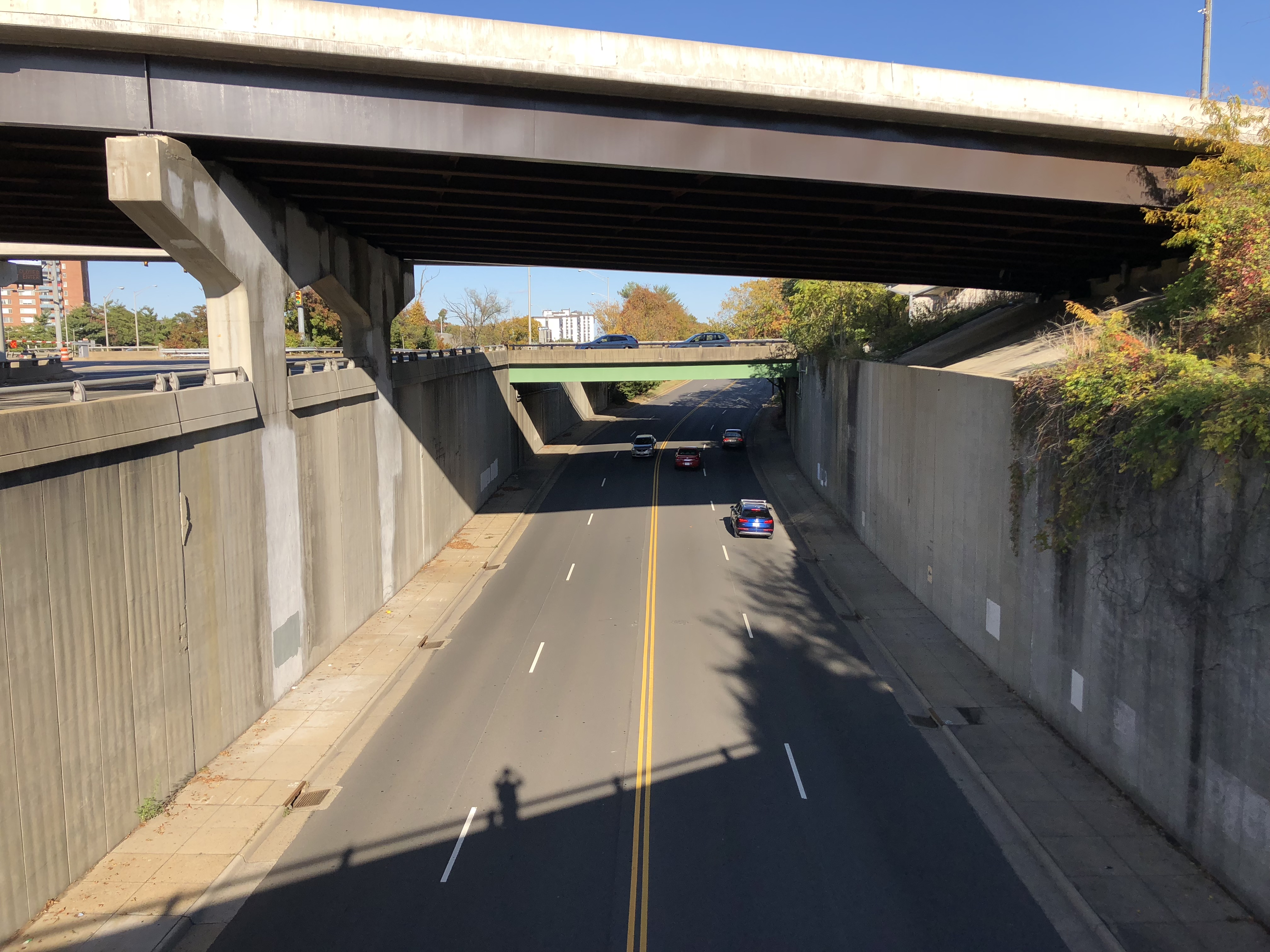
View north along SR 401 as it passes under SR 420 in Alexandria

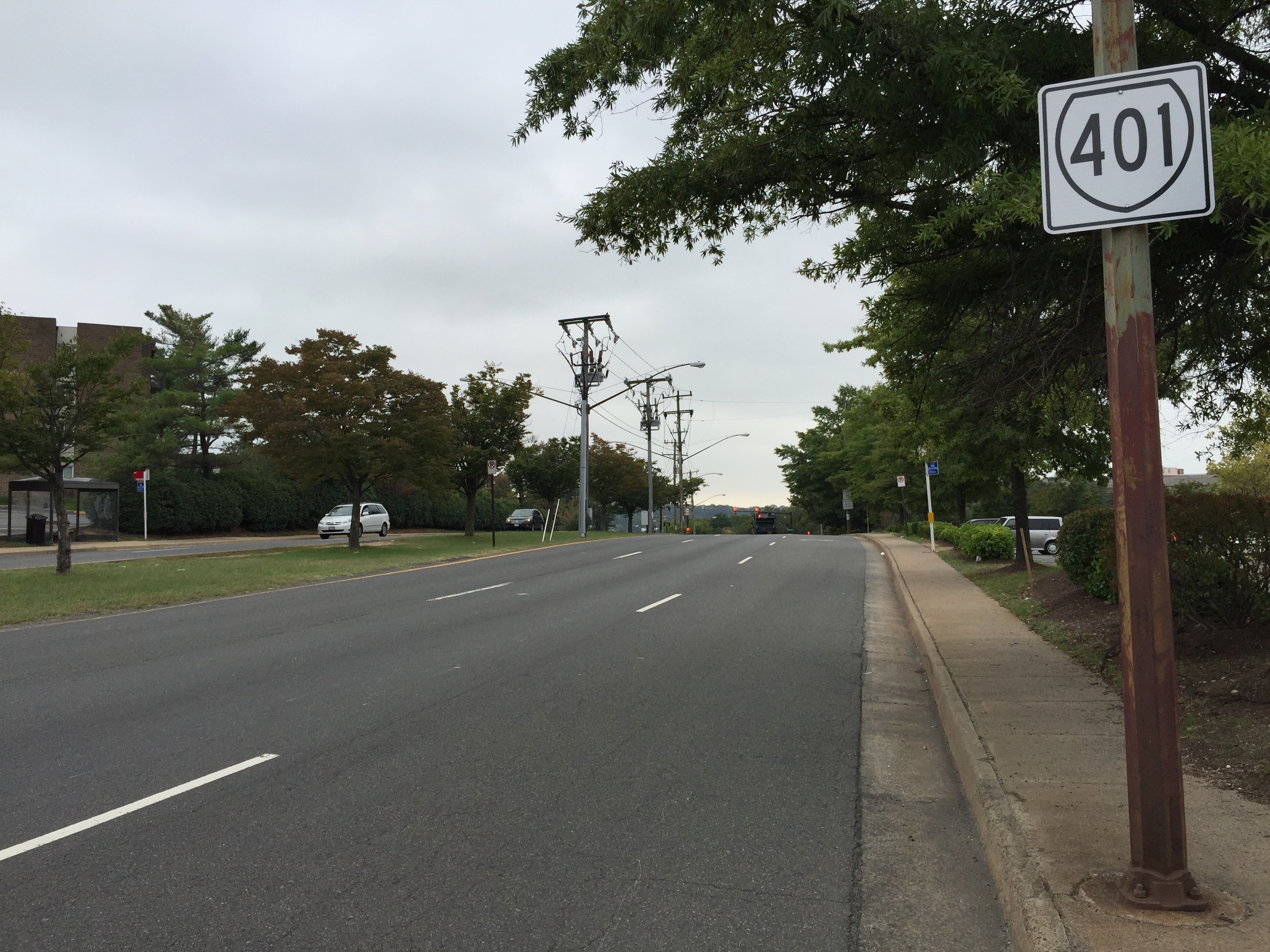
View south along SR 401 just south of SR 236 in Alexandria

SR 401 begins at the south city limit of Alexandria, which is located on the north side of the underpass of CSX's RF&P Subdivision. Van Dorn Street continues south as SR 613 into Fairfax County toward its interchange with Interstate 95 (I-95)/I-495 (Capital Beltway) and Franconia. SR 401, which heads north as a four-lane divided highway, has an intersection with Eisenhower Avenue, an east–west arterial through the industrial southern edge of Alexandria, and has a trumpet interchange with a connector to Eisenhower Avenue and the Van Dorn Street station on the Washington Metro's Blue Line. There is no ramp from the connector to northbound SR 401. The state highway crosses over Norfolk Southern Railway's Washington District and Backlick Run and intersects Edsall Road.

SR 401 continues through a partial cloverleaf interchange with SR 236 (Duke Street) adjacent to now-demolished Landmark Mall. North of SR 236, the state highway becomes an undivided highway, crosses Holmes Run, and begins to closely parallel I-395 (Henry G. Shirley Memorial Highway). SR 401 continues northeast to a point within SR 420's (Seminary Road) overpass of the highway and the latter highway's three-level diamond interchange with I-395. Van Dorn Street continues northeast as an unnumbered street to its end at SR 7 on the boundary between Alexandria and Arlington. Access from Van Dorn Street to SR 420 is provided by a pair of intersections with Kenmore Avenue that lead to a pair of right-in/right-out intersections with the overpassing highway.

== History ==
It was renamed from Lincolnia Road in 1953 due to a city ordinance passed by the Alexandria city council that required all north–south streets to be named for Confederate leaders. It was included on an inventory of Confederate street names in Alexandria, and the city plans to rename all street names on that list at a rate of three per year.

SR 401 was assigned to its present location, previously unnumbered, in the early 1980s, but it only ran as far north as SR 236. In the mid-1980s, it was extended to its current terminus at SR 420. Its current route was once part of Fairfax County, and the portion of SR 401 from immediately south of Edsall Road to its southern terminus was part of SR 613 until it was annexed by Alexandria in the 1950s.

== Major intersections ==
The entire route is in Alexandria.

mi	km	Destinations	Notes
0.00	0.00	SR 613 south (Van Dorn Street) to I-95 / I-495 (Capital Beltway) – Franconia	South city limit of Alexandria; southern terminus
		To Eisenhower Avenue – Van Dorn Street Metro Station	Trumpet interchange; no ramp from crossroad to northbound SR 401
1.05	1.69	SR 236 (Duke Street) to I-395	Partial cloverleaf interchange
2.61	4.20	Van Dorn Street north / Kenmore Avenue to SR 420 (Seminary Road) / I-395	Northern terminus
1.000 mi = 1.609 km; 1.000 km = 0.621 mi
