= Beulah Normal and Theological Institute =

Coordinates: 38°48′14″N 77°2′51″W

Beulah Normal and Theological Institute was the first Black school for educating teachers and preachers during the American Civil War and Reconstruction. It was founded in 1862 in Alexandria, Virginia by an African American preacher, Rev. Clem Robinson, as an upper division of "The First Select Colored School," in that city. This effort preceded any other Black theological or Normal school in the Reconstruction period.

Robinson founded several schools for contraband and freed slaves in Alexandria, Virginia in 1862. He was a native of Virginia, a graduate of Ashmun Institute (now Lincoln University) in Pennsylvania, and an ordained Baptist preacher serving in Philadelphia when he heard the call to head South to educate and preach to former slaves. He left for Alexandria as soon as it was open to educators who could serve the hundreds of contraband or freed ex-slaves in the city. He opened the "First Select Colored School" for elementary and high school students, with help from Black colleagues Mrs. Robinson, Miss Amanda Borden, and Rev. George Washington Parker. Their efforts were supported by the Baptist Free Mission Society of New York, Philadelphia donors, and in time the American Baptist Home Missionary Society. The primary school quickly grew to over 700 students, a night school served working adults, and an upper school served those with some education. Rev's Robinson and Parker assisted the efforts of other pioneers for Black education in Alexandria, like the white New England missionaries Harriet Jacobs and Julia Wilbur.

After founding the Beulah Baptist Church in 1863, Robinson renamed the upper school "The Beulah Normal and Theological Institute," and this grew to 87 students by 1867. Numerous Baptist educators, pastors, and missionaries graduated from his institute. By early 1869, Beulah Normal and Theological reported more ministerial students (30) than any other Baptist school in the South. The school declined over the next few years, however, as northern missionary societies and donors shifted their money to white-run normal and theological schools, like Wayland-VUU, Howard, and Hampton. Robinson's school closed by 1870, due to lack of northern mission boards support, and the rise of free public schools, but he continued to work for African American education through the "First Free School Society of Alexandria" with noted Black politician George Lewis Seaton. He left Beulah Baptist Church in 1875, but continued to work and live in the D.C. region for the rest of the century.
