= DASH (Virginia) =

Transit system in Alexandria, Virginia

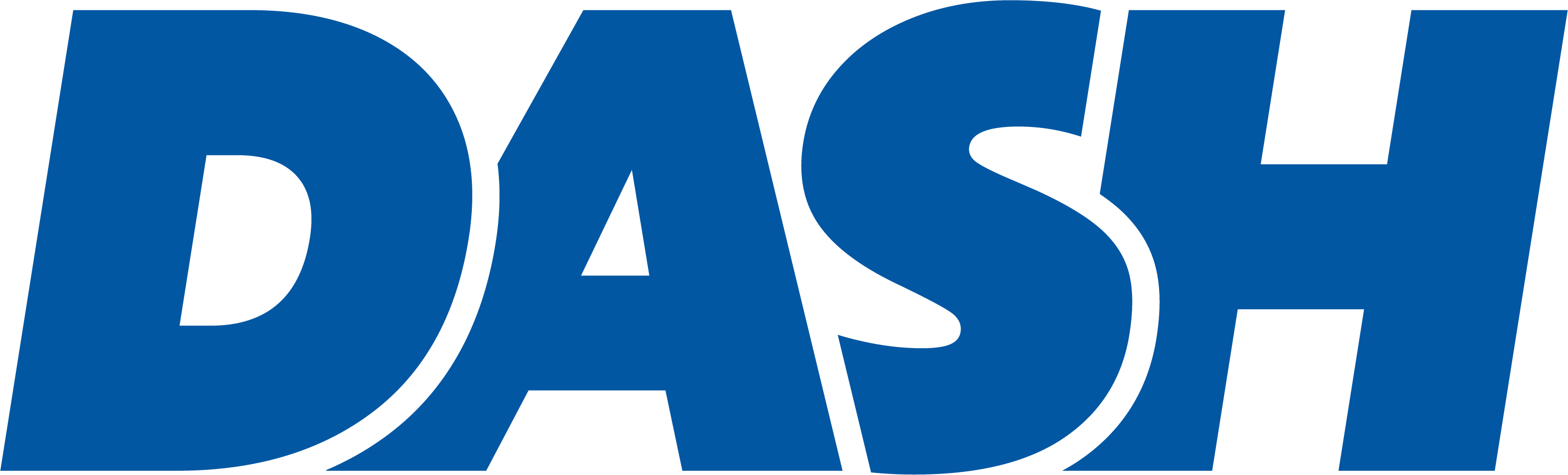

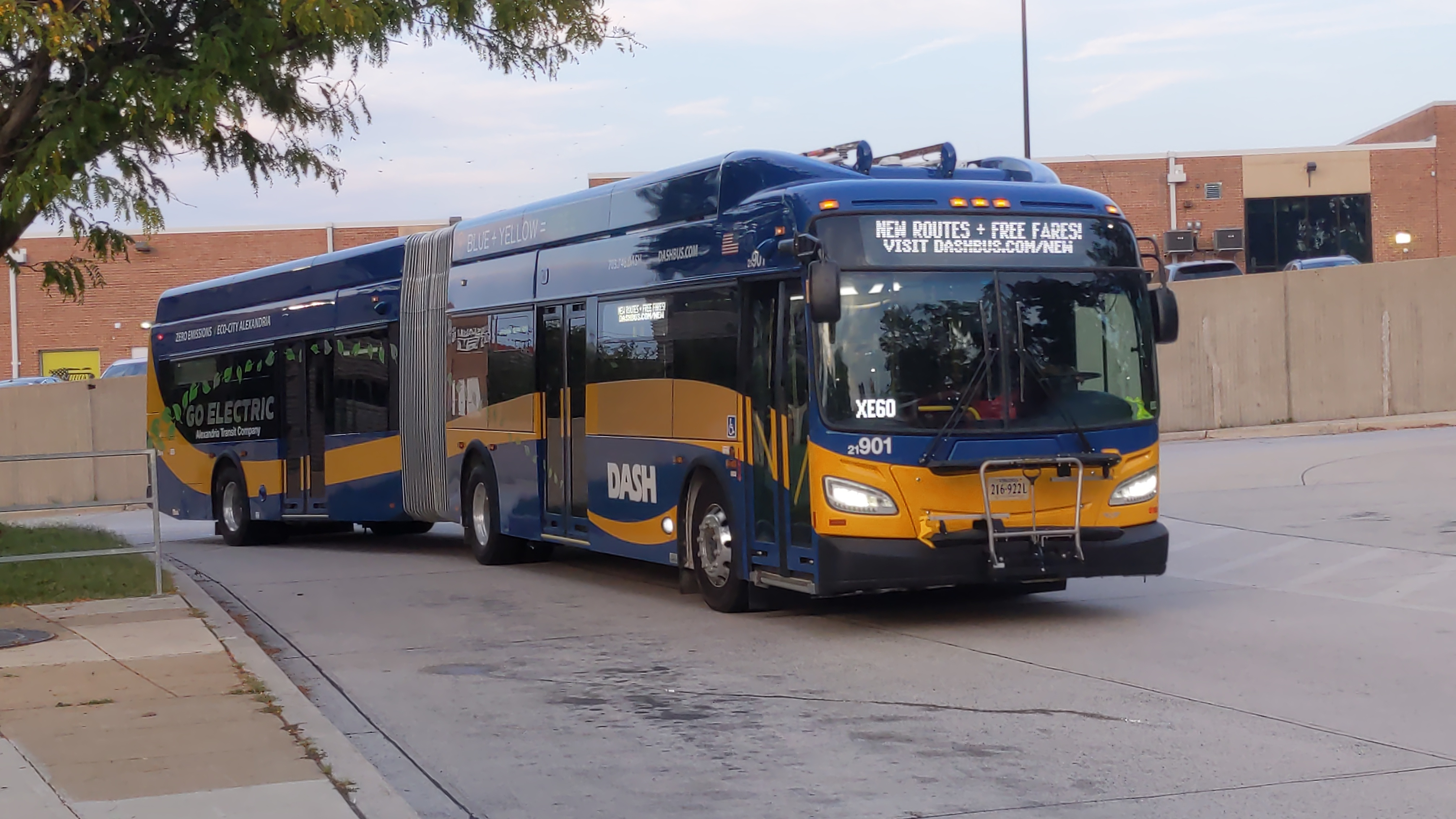
- DASH bus at Van Dorn Street station
- Parent: City of Alexandria
- Founded: March 1984
- Headquarters: 3000 Business Center Drive, Alexandria, VA
- Service area: Alexandria, Virginia
- Service type: Bus service
- Alliance: WMATA
- Routes: 11
- Fleet: Gillig; New Flyer; Proterra
- Daily ridership: 20,200 (Q1 2026)
- Annual ridership: 5,300,000 (2024)
- Fuel type: Diesel, Diesel-electric Hybrid, Battery electric
- Operator: Alexandria Transit Company
- Website: dashbus.com

DASH is the main public transit bus operator in the Northern Virginia city of Alexandria. DASH provides bus service within the City of Alexandria, connecting to local and regional public transit services in the Washington metropolitan area. DASH operates throughout the city of Alexandria, with 124 buses on eleven routes. DASH buses serve all five Washington Metro stations within Alexandria city limits, with additional hubs at the Mark Center Building, the former Landmark Mall, and The Pentagon. DASH buses carry over five million passengers annually as of 2024.

DASH is operated by the Alexandria Transit Company (ATC), a non-profit corporation wholly owned by the City of Alexandria. ATC is governed by an eleven-person board of directors elected by the city council. The Alexandria Transit Company was formed to supplement the regional rail and bus service provided by the Washington Metropolitan Area Transit Authority (WMATA) and to provide a local bus service to the City of Alexandria.

== History ==
In 1981, in anticipation of the opening of the Metrorail stations and the subsequent reordering of Metrobus service, the City Council authorized a feasibility study for a city-sponsored bus system. In 1982, the study recommended a five-route system, using 18 buses.

In 1983, the City Council developed an RFP (Request For Proposal) for management companies to develop a detailed plan for the operation of transit service in the City of Alexandria. The city chose to establish a non-profit public service cooperation that would be wholly owned by the City. This arrangement provided means by which:

- The transit system could be run as a business-type enterprise, and
- City Council could retain overall policy control yet be free from the day-to-day operation of a transit system.

On October 23, 1983, the City Council set up a Transitional Task Force and, on January 24, 1984, instructed the City Attorney to proceed with the incorporation of a non-profit company. The certificate of incorporation was issued by the State Corporation Commission on January 31, and the organizational meeting of the company was held on February 6.

In January 1984, the General Manager employed by the Management Company that was awarded the management contract reported for duty and final preparations began for the opening of revenue service on March 11.

On October 19, 2020, DASH unveiled its first all-electric transit bus at the City Hall of Alexandria.

In September 2021, the entire network was restructured as part of the Alexandra Transit Vision Plan to create a more useful and equitable bus network that encourages more people to get to more places using transit. All Routes were renumbered in either the 30s or 100s eliminating the AT designations.

== Fares ==
As of September 5, 2021, DASH is fare free. Before the free fares, DASH's base fare was $2.00 for riders paying cash or SmarTrip. In 2007, DASH converted its buses to allow the use of the WMATA SmarTrip, an electronic debit farecard. DASH continued to accept and issue paper transfers until they were eliminated altogether January 1, 2013.

== Routes ==
Fixed routes
Route/Name	Terminals		Major streets	Notes
30/OTC; DUKE	Van Dorn Metro	Braddock Road Metro	Duke St, S Van Dorn St	Some AM Eastbound peak trips begin at Edsall Rd & S Whiting St
30/OTC; DUKE	Landmark Mall	Braddock Road Metro	Duke St, S Van Dorn St	Some AM Eastbound peak trips begin at Edsall Rd & S Whiting St
31/OTC; KING	NVCC-Alexandria	Braddock Road Metro	King St	
31/OTC; KING	NVCC-Alexandria	King Street Metro	King St	
32; EISENHOWER VALLEY	Landmark Mall	King Street Metro	Eisenhower Ave, S. Pickett St, Holmes Run Pkwy	
33; DEL RAY	Potomac Yard Metro	King Street Metro	Mount Vernon Ave	
34; OLD TOWN NORTH	Potomac Yard Metro	Lee Center	N. Fairfax St, S. Royal St	
35; WEST END	Pentagon Metro	Van Dorn Metro	S. Van Dorn St, N. Beauregard St, I-395	Some late night trips terminate/begin at Park Center
36A/B; CROSSTOWN VIA N EARLEY/PARK PL	Potomac Yard Metro	Mark Center Station	Seminary Rd, Menokin Dr, King St, Valley Dr, W. Glebe Rd	
102; SEMINARY HILL	Mark Center Station	King Street Metro	Seminary Rd, Janneys Ln	Weekday service only
103; RUSSEL RUSH	Pentagon Metro	Braddock Road Metro	W. Braddock Rd, W. Glebe Rd, I-395	Peak service only
104; NORTH RIDGE RUSH	Pentagon Metro	Braddock Road Metro	W. Braddock Rd, Cameron Mills Rd, I-395	Peak service only
King Street Trolley	King Street Metro	Market Square	King St	

== Fleet ==
DASH's bus fleet consists of 120 Diesel, Hybrid, and Electric buses produced by Gillig, New Flyer, and Proterra.

=== Active ===
Photo	Type	Delivered	Numbers (Total)	Engine	Transmission	Notes
	Gillig; Phantom 40'	2005	101–102 (2 buses)	Cummins ISL EPA 2004	Allison B400R6	ex-PRTC OmniRide Buses, bought in Spring 2019.; 101 & 102 have been retired from regular passenger service.; 101 was preserved as a DASH museum bus, and is also used for charter services.
	Gillig; Low Floor HEV 35'	2011–2017	200–233 (34 buses)	Cummins ISB6.7 EPA 2010, 2013	Allison H-40EP Hybrid System	First low floor buses for DASH.; Oldest units are currently being retired and replaced by Electric Buses.
	Gillig; Low Floor HEV 40'	2011–2017	300–311 (12 buses)	Cummins ISB6.7 EPA 2010, 2013	Allison H-40EP Hybrid System	First low floor buses for DASH.; Oldest units are currently being retired and replaced by Electric Buses.
	Gillig; Low Floor Trolley HEV 29'	2011	400–404 (5 trolley buses)	Cummins ISB6.7 EPA 2010, 2013	Allison H-40EP Hybrid System	Operates on the King Street Trolley route.; To be replaced by Electric Buses.
	Gillig; Low Floor Trolley HEV 35'	2015	405 (1 trolley bus)	Cummins ISB6.7 EPA 2010, 2013	Allison H-40EP Hybrid System	Operates on the King Street Trolley route.; To be replaced by Electric Buses.
	Gillig; Low Floor 35'	2018	501–514 (14 buses)	Cummins L9 EPA 2017	Allison B400R6, B3400xFE	
	New Flyer; Xcelsior XD35	2019–2020	515–530 (16 buses)	Cummins L9 EPA 2019	Allison B400R6, B3400xFE	
	New Flyer; Xcelsior XD40	2020–2025	701–721 (21 buses)	Cummins L9 EPA 2019, 2021, 2024	Allison B400R6, B3400xFE	
	New Flyer; Xcelsior CHARGE XE40	2020	801–803 (3 buses)	Siemens ELFA-2		First all-electric transit buses for DASH.
	Proterra; ZX5+	2021	804–810 (7 buses)	UQM PowerPhase HD-250+	Eaton EEV-7202 EV	
	New Flyer; Xcelsior CHARGE NG XE60 articulated	2021–2025	901–906 (6 buses)	Siemens/Cummins-Accelera ELFA-3, ZF AVE 130		

=== On order ===
Photo	Type	Year	Powertrain	Notes
	Gillig; Low Floor Trolley 35' EV	2026	Cummins BES	Partially funded by the FY23 FTA Bus and Low- and No-Emission Grant Awards.; Units currently being delivered.
N/A	TBA	2026–2027	TBA	Partially funded by the FY23 FTA Bus and Low- and No-Emission Grant Awards.

=== Retired fleet ===
Year	Type	Numbers (Total)	Picture	Engine	Transmission	Notes
1984–1991	Bus Industries of America; Orion I	1–33 (33 buses)		Detroit Diesel 6V71N, 6V92TA, Cummins L10	Allison MT-644, HT-747, Voith DIWA 863.2	
1996–1999	Gillig; Phantom 35'	34–58 (25 buses)		Cummins C8.3, ISC, ISM	Allison B400R5, Voith DIWA 863.3	
2000–2007	Orion Bus Industries; Orion V	59–99 (41 buses)		Cummins ISM	Voith DIWA 863.3, 863.3E, 864.3E	Last order of Orion buses for DASH.; 95 Was preserved by the Hershey Antique Auto Museum.; 96 Was preserved as a DASH museum bus, and is also used for charter services.; 97 Was preserved by New Jersey Transportation Heritage Center.
2002	Neoplan USA; AN460 (articulated)	601–614 (14 buses)		Detroit Diesel Series 60	Allison B500R6	First non-WMATA-operated articulated buses in the Washington region.; Used for MetroRail replacement bus service.; Formerly Westchester County Bee-Line Units.
2002	Motor Coach Industries; D4500	103–105 (3 buses)		Detroit Diesel Series 60	Allison B500R6	ex-PRTC Buses, bought in 2019.; Used for MetroRail replacement bus service.
2007	Gillig; Phantom 35'	100–103 (4 buses)		Cummins ISM	Allison B400R6	
