= Landmark Mall =

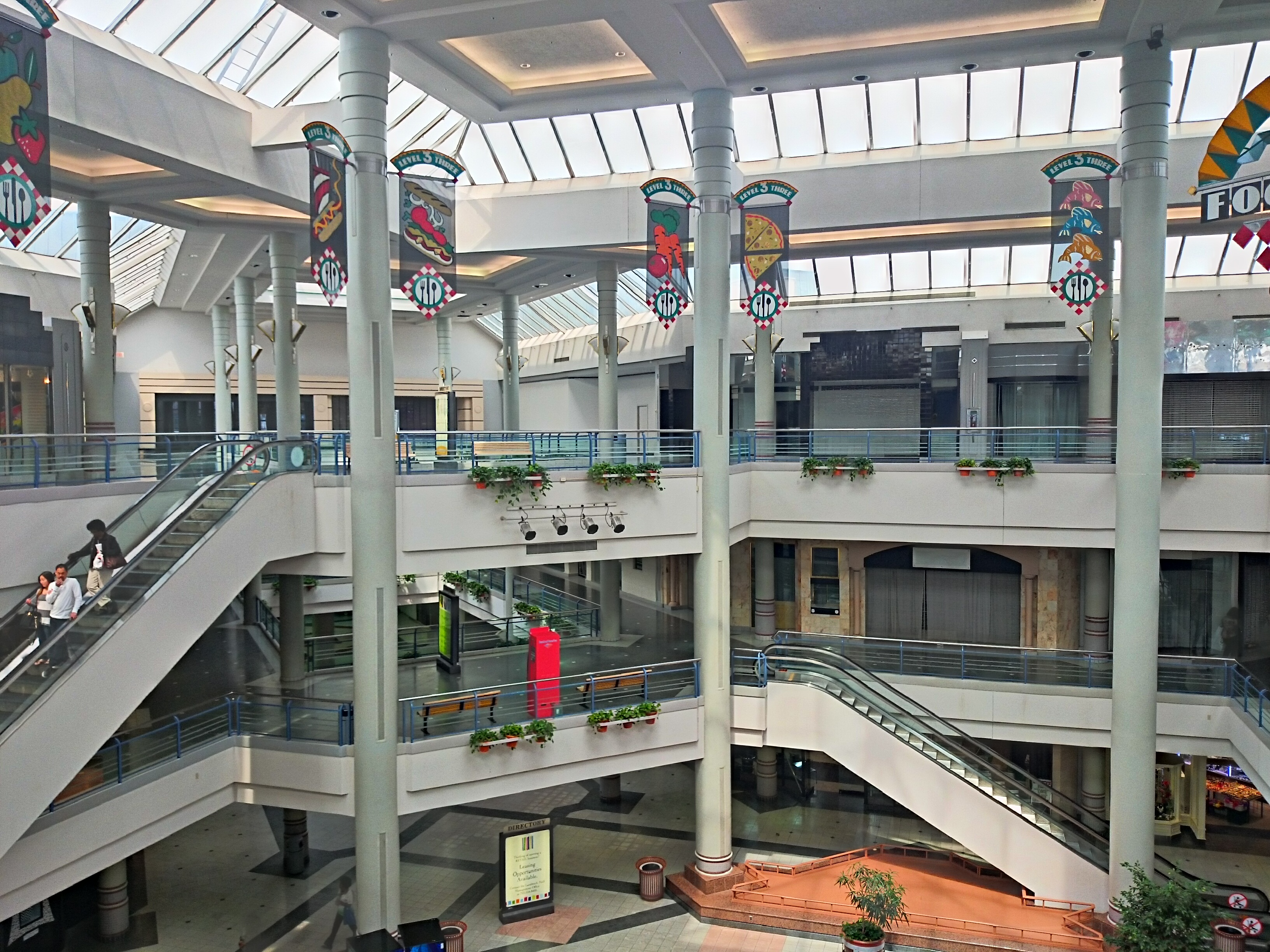
- Mall interior, 2015
- Location: Alexandria, Virginia
- Coordinates: 38°48′58.3″N 77°7′54.1″W
- Address: Duke St., I-395 and Van Dorn St.
- Opened: August 4, 1965 (Enclosed in 1990)
- Closed: January 31, 2017
- Previous names: Landmark Center
- Manager: Howard Hughes Holdings
- Owner: Howard Hughes Holdings
- Num. of stores: 0 (125 at peak)
- Num. of anchor tenants: 0 (3 at peak)
- Floor area: 675,000 square feet (62,700 m^{2})
- Floors: 3
- Public transit: Landmark Mall Rdwy & Mall Entrance 30 32 35 A25 A27 F23 F24

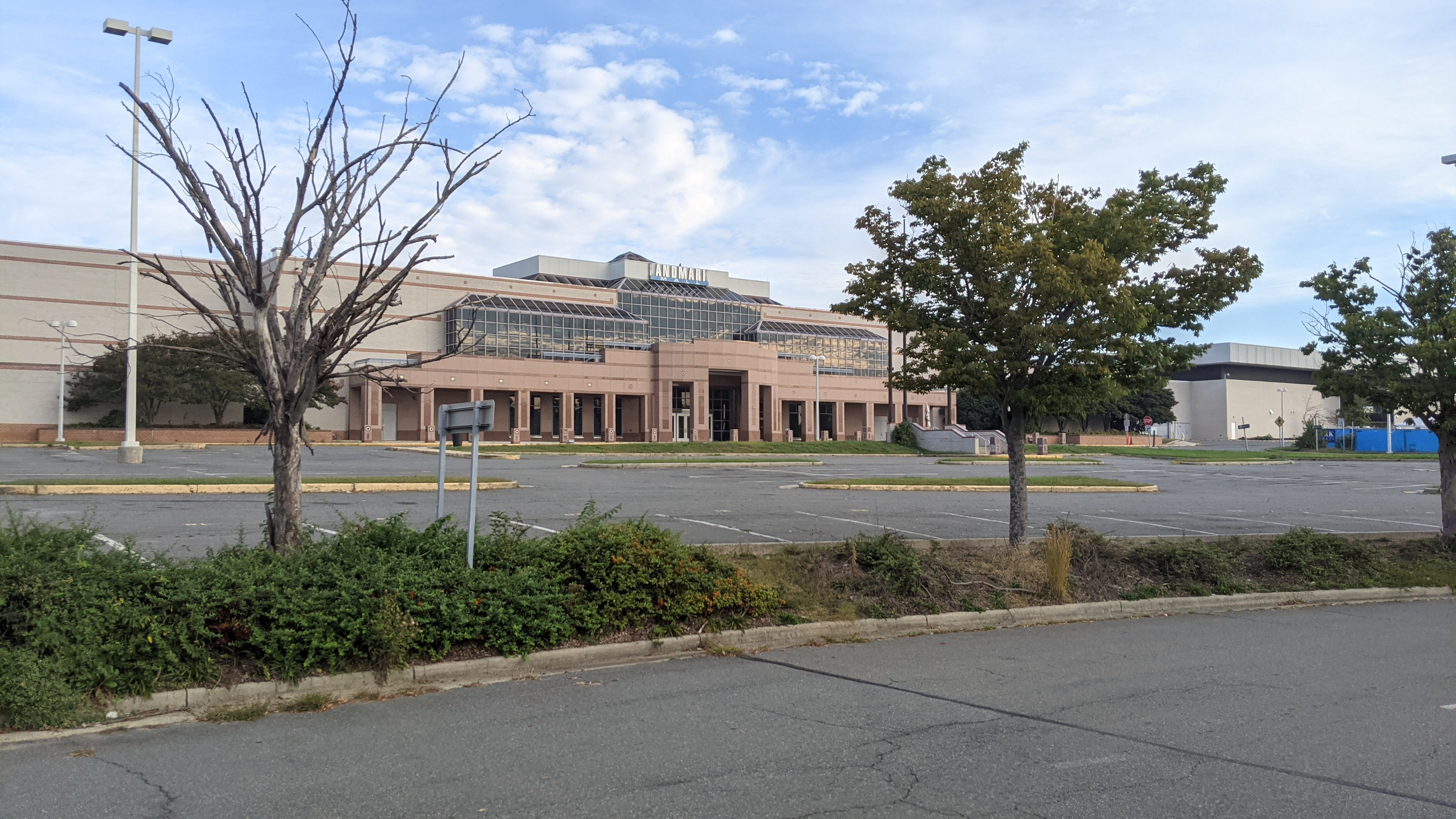
Landmark Mall in 2021

Landmark Mall, also Landmark Regional Shopping Center, was a shopping mall in Alexandria, Virginia. Located in a triangle formed by Duke Street (SR 236), I-395, and Van Dorn Street (SR 401), the mall opened as Landmark Center in 1965, closed in 2017, and was demolished in 2022. The mall was anchored by Sears, Lord & Taylor and Macy's.

== History ==
The mall opened on August 4, 1965, with Virginia Lt. Gov. Mills E. Godwin, Jr. cutting the ceremonial ribbon. It was the first mall in the Washington D.C. area to feature three anchor department stores; the Hecht Co. (later Macy's) (163,000 square feet (15,100 m^{2})), Sears (236,000 square feet (21,900 m^{2})), and Woodward & Lothrop (later JCPenney, then Lord & Taylor) (151,000 square feet (14,000 m^{2})). The mall opened with 32 stores in the 675,000-square-foot (62,700 m^{2}) center including Bond Clothes, Casual Corner, People's Drug Store, Raleigh Haberdasher, Thom McAn, and Waldenbooks. The center also included the second location of S&W Cafeteria in the Washington D.C. suburbs.

Originally an outdoor mall, it was enclosed in 1990.

In 2006 the mall's owner, General Growth Properties, announced its plan to convert the mall into an open-air "town center" shopping center. The plans were not realized.

The Howard Hughes Corporation became the new owner in 2009. Lord & Taylor announced in May of the same year that it would be closing its store at the mall.

The Howard Hughes Corporation showed its plan to transform the site into an 'urban town' in 2013. The plan would turn the mall into an outdoor center with retail and residential facilities.

In June 2013, Alexandria City Council approved the plans to redevelop the mall.

On January 4, 2017, Macy's announced it would close its Landmark Mall store that year. Subsequently, the mall's owners notified tenants (except Sears) they were to vacate by January 31, indicating that approved redevelopment is imminent. At final build out, Landmark would transform into a walkable, mixed-use urban village with approximately 317,000 square feet (29,500 m^{2}) of modern shops and restaurants, up to 400 new residential units and an updated parking structure. In addition to the new retail and residences, the new Landmark would be an open-air community destination featuring multiple plazas and green spaces, outdoor seating, seasonal entertainment, and public art. There would be numerous full-service and fast-casual dining options, and a 10-screen luxury cinema. Howard Hughes purchased the Macy's site in 2017. In June 2018, the vacant Macy's store was transformed into a homeless shelter. In November 2018, Howard Hughes Corporation announced it had partnered with Seritage Growth Properties, which owns the Sears site, and among the 235 properties Sears Holdings spun-off in 2015 into Seritage, to redevelop the entire 51-acre (20.639-hectare) property.

The 2020 film Wonder Woman 1984 had scenes filmed at the mall in June and July 2018. In this film, it is named the "Southfields Mall" and received a 1980s-themed makeover.

== Redevelopment ==
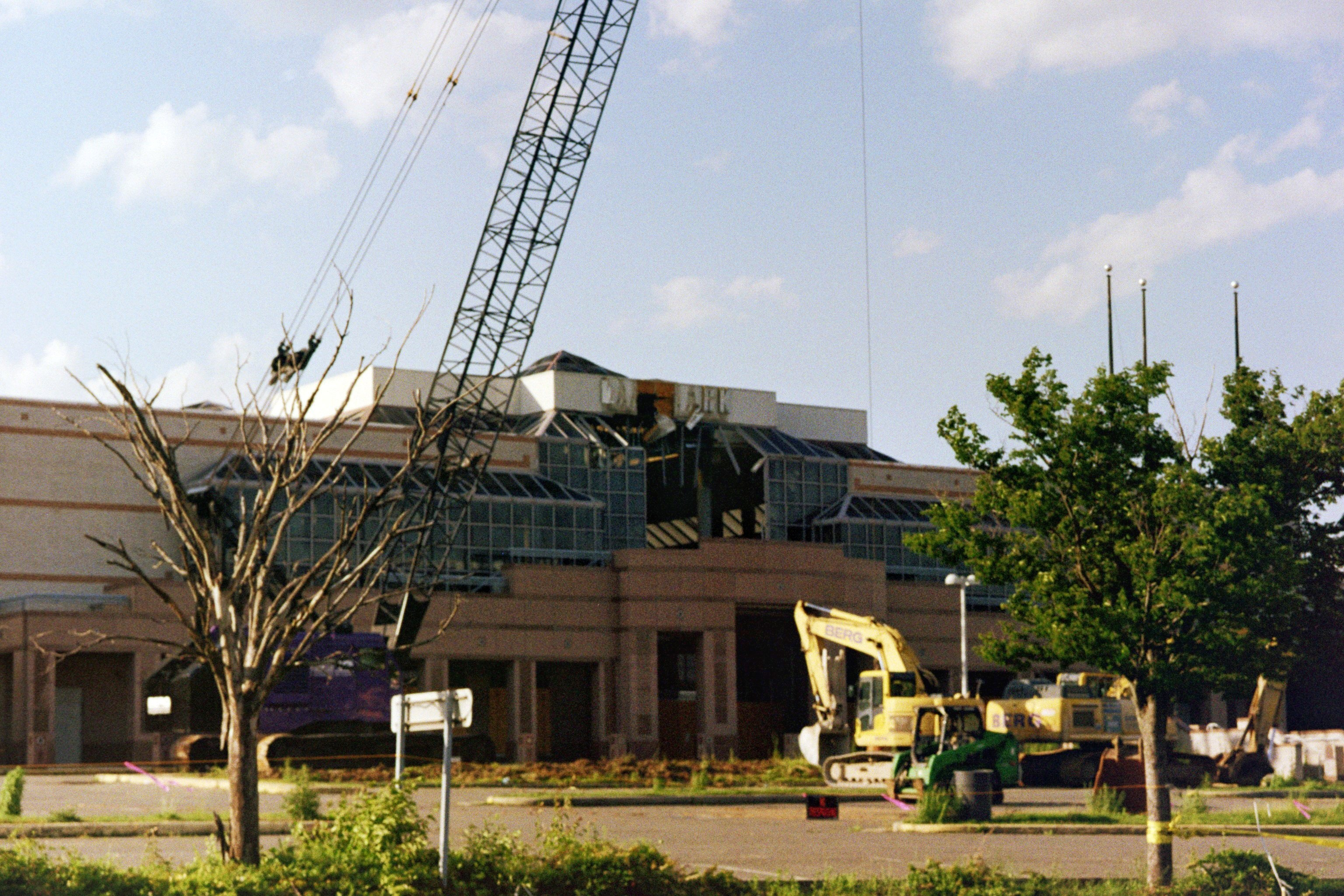
The mall in May 2022, a few days after demolition commenced

In early 2020, planning related to demolition and redevelopment began and decisions about funding and issuing of permits were not completed.

On July 1, 2020, it was announced that Sears would also be closing as part of a plan to close 28 stores nationwide which would leave the mall entirely vacant.

On December 22, 2020, it was announced that the area would be redeveloped as a new mixed-use development with a new Inova Alexandria Hospital, with the existing hospital beginning to be relocated in 2025.

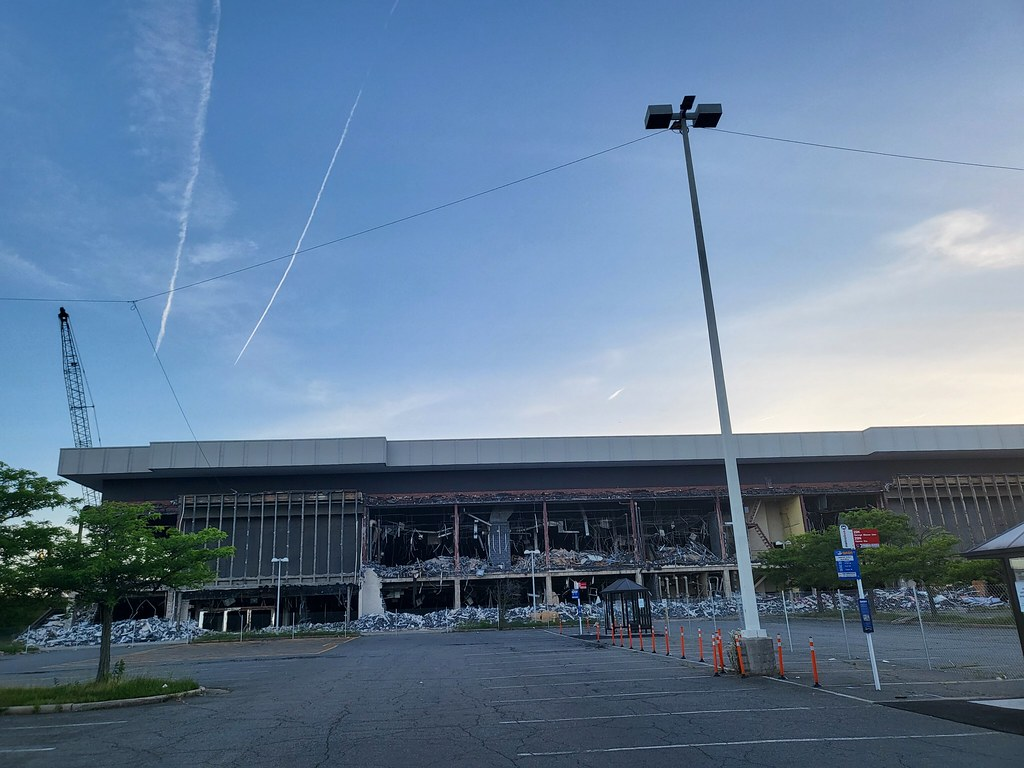
Landmark Mall under demolition

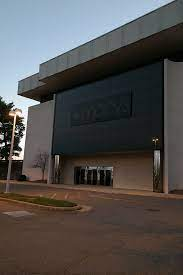
Landmark Mall's Macy's, 2020

On July 6, 2021, it was announced that the Alexandria City Council unanimously approved the redevelopment agreements for the site of the former Landmark Mall, which will result in up to approximately four million square feet of new development. The project will be anchored by the relocation and expansion of Inova's Alexandria Hospital bringing more than 2,000 healthcare workers to the medical campus. As part of the collaboration between the City and Inova, the Alexandria City Council also approved a master plan amendment and rezoning of the current Inova Alexandria Hospital site on Seminary Road to permit a variety of residential uses, which will facilitate the sale of the property in advance of its relocation to the Landmark site. This land-use decision was the first legislative action by Council required to bring this plan to reality. Alexandria City Council also approved the use of $54 million in public bond financing to allow the city to acquire the land for the hospital and lease it to Inova, as well as $86 million in public bond financing for site preparation and infrastructure at the Landmark site and adjacent Duke Street and Van Dorn Street corridors. On January 24, 2022, it was announced that the project would be renamed to WestEnd Alexandria.

Demolition began on May 12, 2022, and lasted six months. The parking garage was left intact. On September 5, 2023, the Alexandria Planning Commission approved many special use permits for the Foulger-Pratt project. It will include retail and restaurant pavilions, trails, and recreational facilities that will house a skating rink and pickleball courts.

The West Alexandria Transit Center, a transit hub serving local DASH and Metrobus routes, opened in October 2025.
