= Van Dorn Street station =

Washington Metro station in Virginia, US

Van Dorn Street
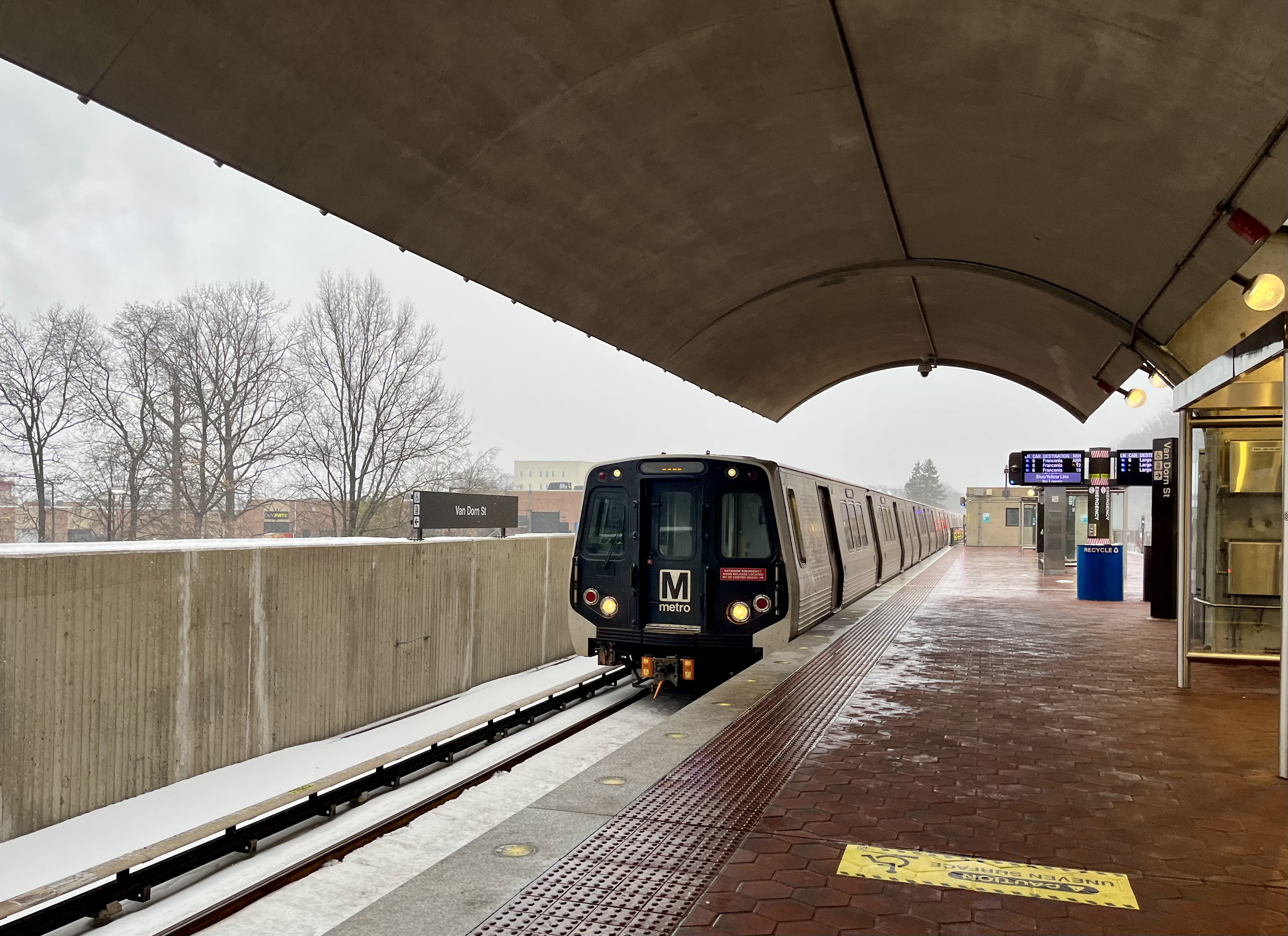
- A Blue Line train arriving into the station in February 2026

General information
- Location: 5690 Eisenhower Avenue; Alexandria, Virginia
- Coordinates: 38°47′58″N 77°07′43″W
- Owner: Washington Metropolitan Area Transit Authority
- Platforms: 1 island platform
- Tracks: 2
- Connections: DASH: 30, 32, 35; Fairfax Connector: 109, 231, 232, 321, 322; Metrobus: A27, A29

Construction
- Structure type: Embankment
- Parking: 361 spaces
- Cycle facilities: Capital Bikeshare, 30 racks, 6 lockers
- Accessible: Yes

Other information
- Station code: J02

History
- Opened: June 15, 1991; 35 years ago
- Rebuilt: 2019

Passengers
- 2025: 1,604 (average weekday)
- Rank: 84 of 98

Services
Preceding station	Washington Metro	Following station
Franconia–Springfield Terminus	Blue Line	King Street–Old Town toward Downtown Largo

Former services
Preceding station	Washington Metro	Following station
Franconia–Springfield Terminus	Yellow Line	King Street–Old Town toward Greenbelt
Route map
Location

Van Dorn Street station is a Washington Metro station located on the boundary between Fairfax County and the independent city of Alexandria in Virginia, United States, on the Blue Line. The station's island platform lies in unincorporated Rose Hill in Fairfax County, while the station's entrance and parking facilities are in Alexandria. The station opened on June 15, 1991. The station is located at South Van Dorn Street and Eisenhower Avenue, next to the Capital Beltway.

== History ==
=== Construction ===
An 83-station, 97.2-mile Adopted Regional System plan for Metrorail was approved by the Washington Metropolitan Area Transit Authority (WMATA) on March 1, 1968. Van Dorn Street station was included as part of the Adopted Regional System.

In June 1977, the City of Alexandria, Southern Railway, and UPS reached an agreement allowing WMATA to retain the air rights for the construction of Van Dorn Street station when funding became available. After years of planning, Metro awarded a $32.3 million ($76.3 million in 2024) contract Dillingham Construction in March 1987 for them to complete the station by 1991. Originally slated to be part of the Yellow Line, in early 1990 it was decided that Van Dorn Street station would be served by the Blue Line, with the Yellow Line being redirected to Huntington station.

The station opened on June 15, 1991 as a one-stop extension of the Blue Line 3.9 miles (6.3 km) southwest of the King Street–Old Town station. Van Dorn Street would remain as the southern terminus of the Blue Line from its completion until the opening of the Franconia–Springfield station on June 29, 1997.

=== Opening to present day ===
Some Yellow Line trains to/from Greenbelt station began to serve Van Dorn Street during weekday rush hours on June 18, 2012, as part of Metrorail's Rush+ service. On June 25, 2017, Yellow Line trains stopped serving the station due to the elimination of Rush+ as part of major changes to the Metrorail system.

In May 2018, Metro announced an extensive renovation of platforms at twenty stations across the system. The Blue and Yellow Lines south of Ronald Reagan Washington National Airport station, including the Van Dorn Street station, would be closed from May to September 2019. The platform at Van Dorn Street was rebuilt starting in September 2019, necessitating single-track operations on the Blue Line for several weeks. A nearby rail bridge was also rebuilt during the reconstruction. From March 26, 2020, until June 28, 2020, this station was closed due to the 2020 coronavirus pandemic.

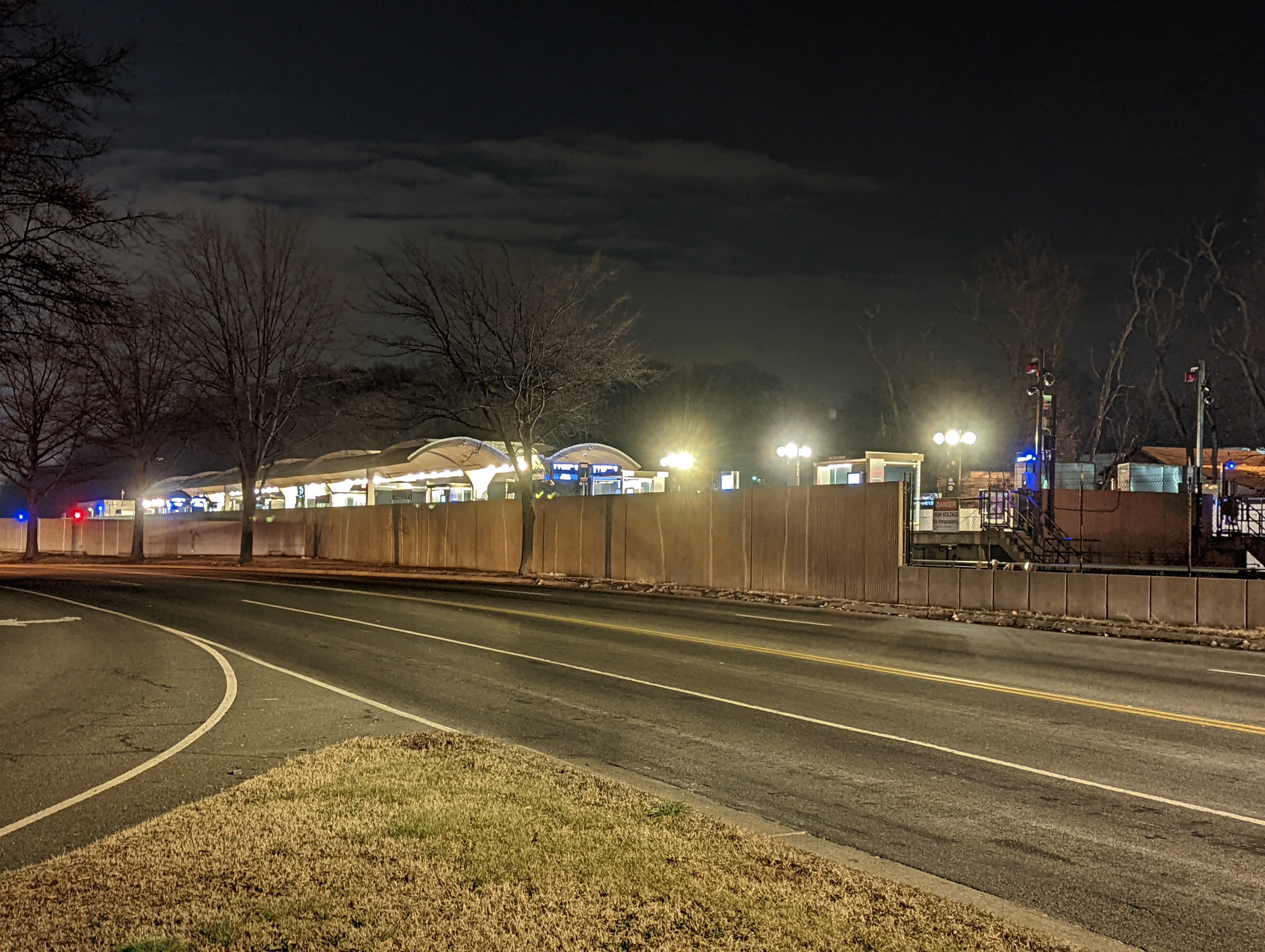
View of the station from Eisenhower Avenue in January 2022

Between September 10, 2022, and November 5, 2022, Van Dorn Street was closed due to construction related to the new Potomac Yard station, which impacted all stations south of Ronald Reagan Washington National Airport station. Temporary shuttle buses were provided throughout the shutdown.

== Station layout ==
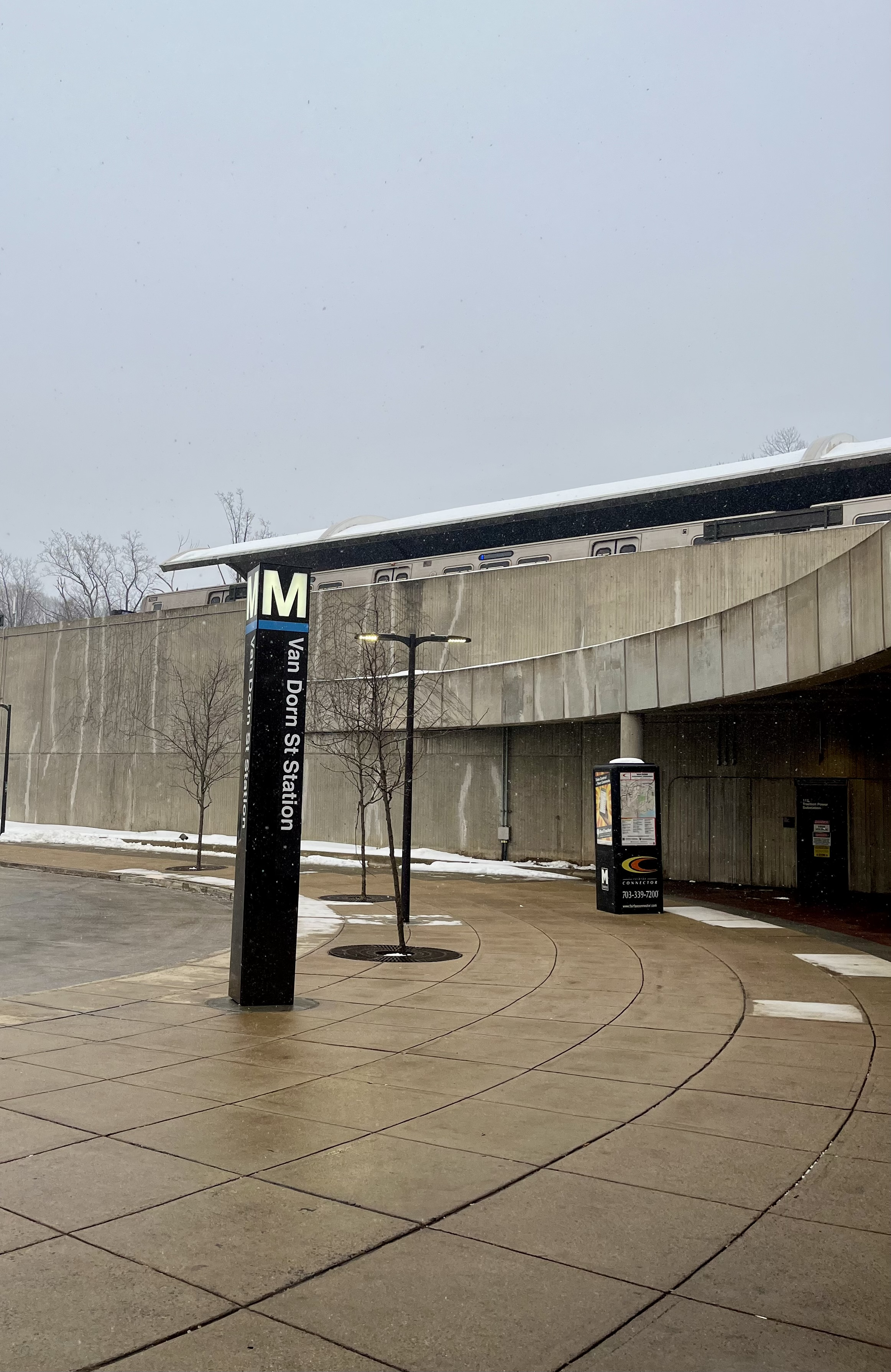
Pylon to Van Dorn Street station at the station's bus bay, with station platform in background

The station is the last Metrorail station to be built with a "Gull I" outdoor canopy design, named for the canopy's resemblance to a flying seagull. It has an island platform situated between Eisenhower Avenue and the RF&P Subdivision tracks, which carry Virginia Railway Express and Amtrak trains.

P Platform level	Southbound	← toward Franconia–Springfield (Terminus)
P Platform level	Island platform
P Platform level	Northbound	toward Downtown Largo (King Street–Old Town) →
P Platform level	Track 3	← Fredericksburg Line and Amtrak do not stop
P Platform level	Track 2	Fredericksburg Line and Amtrak do not stop →
G	Street level	Exit/entrance, buses, parking, fare control, ticket machines, station agent

=== Exits ===
The station has two accessible exits on both sides of Eisenhower Avenue. The exit on the south side of Eisenhower Avenue connects with a bus bay loop serving DASH, Fairfax Connector, and Metrobus routes. The exit on the north side of Eisenhower Avenue, accessed via a tunnel underneath the road, leads to a 361-space parking lot.
