= Roberts Memorial United Methodist Church =

Historic church in Virginia, US

- U.S. National Register of Historic Places
- Virginia Landmarks Register
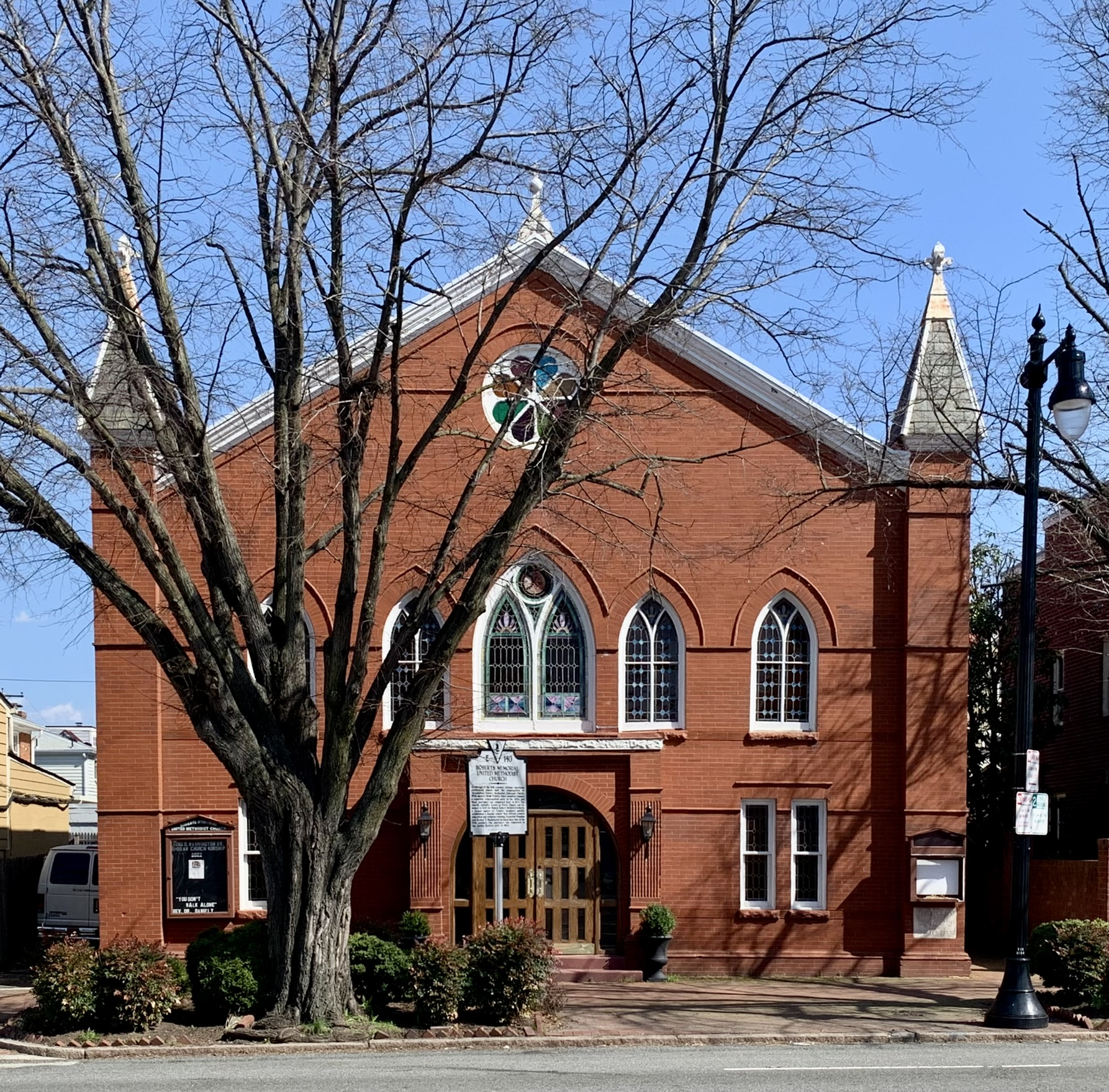
- Roberts Memorial UMC in March 2022

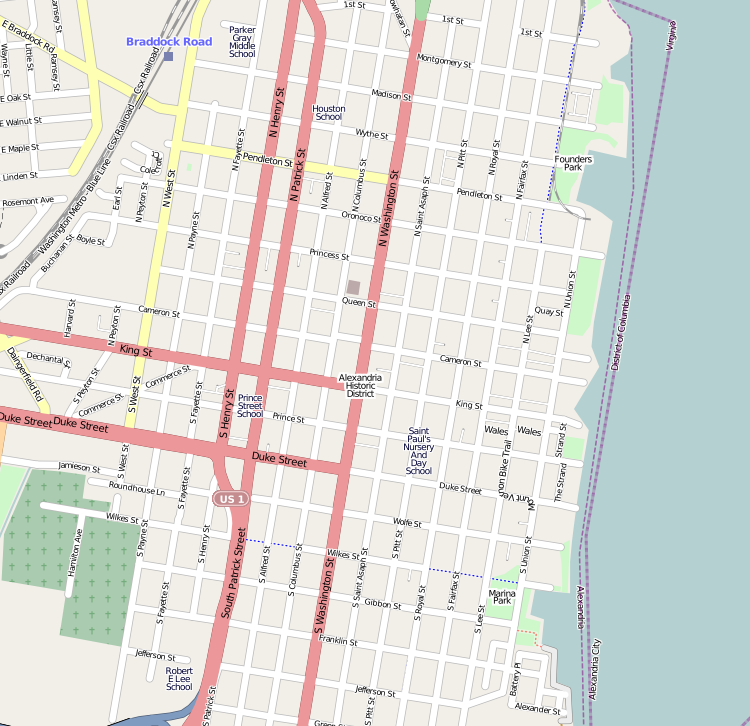
- Location within Alexandria Historical District Location within Virginia Location within the United States
- Location: 606-A S. Washington St., Alexandria, Virginia
- Coordinates: 38°48′3″N 77°2′53″W
- Area: less than one acre
- Architect: Veitch, William
- Architectural style: Gothic Revival
- MPS: African American Historic Resources of Alexandria, Virginia MPS
- NRHP reference No.: 03001428
- VLR No.: 100-5015-0006

Significant dates
- Added to NRHP: January 16, 2004
- Designated VLR: September 10, 2003

Roberts Memorial United Methodist Church is the second oldest Black congregation in Alexandria, Virginia. (Note: .Alfred Street Baptist Church dates back to 1806.) Founded in 1834 and originally known as Davis Chapel, it has served a mostly Black community for almost two centuries. It is a member of the United Methodist Church.

Built in 1834, the original church building is still in use and is now the oldest African American church structure in Alexandria. It was added to the National Register of Historic Places in 2004. As well as being a house of worship and community gathering place, it also housed one of the earliest schools for Black children and adults at a time when the laws of Virginia banned the education of African Americans.

== History ==
=== Early years ===
In 1830 approximately 250 free and enslaved African Americans, all members of the dominant Trinity Methodist Church in Alexandria, made known their wish for a church of their own; the white leadership of Trinity was supportive of their plans. They bought lots for $200 in north Alexandria, however further plans were put on hold following Nat Turner's Rebellion in 1831. In 1834 these first lots were sold and a new property acquired for $350 on South Washington Street, sandwiched between the established Black neighborhoods of ‘the Bottoms’ and ‘Hayti’. (Note: .For more on the historic Black neighborhoods of Alexandria, see Courageous Journey, page 16ff.) The deed to the property stipulated that it be used to build a house of worship for the Methodist Episcopal Church.

These Black Americans had been well integrated into the Methodist congregation of Alexandria Station, which had worshiped since 1804 at the Methodist Meeting House, a few blocks north on Washington Street (later renamed Trinity Methodist Church). As was customary, they sat for services in the gallery under supervision of a white pastor. They had their own religious classes and on Sunday afternoons they attended their own prayer meetings and revivals in homes or at Old Zion, a former school house on North Columbus St. One of their members, Cato, had become a well-respected member and orator within the Trinity Congregation. Despite this, or perhaps because of it, the African American members of Trinity wanted their own church. It was only in a self-segregating community of faith, away from whites, that they had the freedom to nurture their distinctive voice and to train their own members in positions of leadership and responsibility.

The church building on South Washington St. was completed in 1834 and developed rapidly into an important meeting place for the Black neighborhoods that surrounded it. By 1840 the congregation included 4 Black lay preachers and 10 Black class leaders of the religious classes in the church. The church also held secular classes to teach basic literacy skills: reading, writing, arithmetic. They had a choir and a missionary society. The church was doing well enough financially that a parish house two doors down from the church was purchased in 1841. A single-story Lecture Room was built in the yard behind the church as an additional gathering space. This Black Methodist community of faith offered a spiritual, physical and emotional anchor for the surrounding Black neighborhoods of ‘the Bottoms’ and ‘Hayti’. During these first decades, the membership of Davis Chapel grew to about 700, with many members boating across the Potomac from Maryland. Having been ceded to the District of Columbia in 1801, the town of Alexandria offered a relatively secure place for Blacks and a refuge for runaway enslaved people under the less restrictive laws of the district.

=== Retrocession and Church Split over Slavery ===
Alexandria was retroceded to Virginia in 1846 and the town came under the more restrictive Virginia state laws concerning African Americans. One Virginia law at that time prohibited five or more African Americans from gathering together without oversight of a white person, another law prohibited the education of Black Americans. Due to these new restrictions, many activities at Davis Chapel were forced to close at this time.

Racial tensions also affected the leadership of the church. In 1845 the Methodist Episcopal Church split over the issue of slavery; the southern conferences supporting slavery formed a new General Conference, the Methodist Episcopal Church, South. The Rev. Davis, who had been instrumental in the formation of Davis Chapel, chose to align himself with the southern conferences. In response, Davis Chapel decided to change its name to Roberts Chapel to honor Bishop Robert Richford Roberts, a distinguished leader in the Methodist Episcopal Church who had died in 1843. Over the next decade, the nation marched inexorably into the crisis of the Civil War.

=== Civil War in Alexandria ===
Federal troops occupied Alexandria at the start of the Civil War in 1861, making the restrictive Virginia laws concerning African Americans mute. Activities of the church picked up again under the jurisdiction of the Union troops. Roberts Memorial Chapel was able to re-open its school in 1862, and by 1864 the Sunday School recorded 117 scholars and 200 books in the church library. By 1864 Roberts Memorial Methodist Chapel was no longer a mission church under the supervision of Trinity; they had become an independent African American parish within the national Methodist hierarchy.

=== Reconstruction and Beyond ===
The school at Roberts Chapel was encouraged to reopen in 1862 when the city was occupied by Federal troops during the Civil War. Permission to reopen the school first had to be obtained from the provost marshal for the city. Once permission was received, church members opened a school in the church as well as a Sunday school and a secular schoolhouse in the neighborhood. As public schools in the city were established for both Blacks and whites in the 1880s, the educational work of the church was limited to the Sunday School.

In the late 19th century, Roberts Chapel established a mission, Woodlawn Church in Woodlawn, Virginia, supplying it with preachers until it could support a pastor of its own. The two churches continued to have annual re-unions for a number of years.

As the church continued to grow in the decades following the Civil War, the leaders looked for more space to host their activities. In the 1920s they bought the old Paff Shoe Factory just north of the church, on the corner of Washington and Gibbons Streets. This became the Roberts Chapel Community building, an important site used to host church and community activities during the years of segregation. (Note: In a 2002 oral interview Mabel Burts described the many happy times she shared with friends in the building during her youth. “Our church owned that building where the Demaine’s Funeral Home is now, Roberts Memorial,” she recalled. “It was Roberts Chapel then. They bought that building. And they had movies in there. We [would] go over there and used to play games and everything. Because we wasn’t allowed to … go to the theater, the white theater, we had to go clean to Washington if we wanted to see a movie. And they had movies in there for us when we were coming up.”) During the Depression the church found itself unable to maintain the property, and ownership of the building was relinquished.

== Building ==
Roberts Memorial United Methodist Church is a two-story, brick, vernacular Gothic Revival structure. Constructed in 1834, it is located south of King Street in the 600 block of South Washington Street, sandwiched between the historic Black neighborhoods of ‘the Bottoms’ and ‘Hayti’. The church fronts South Washington Street to the west, with an ornate facade of decorative brick and stained-glass windows. Although the present narthex, façade and most of the stained glass were added during extensive remodeling in 1894, the side walls of the 1834 building remain, and include the original window openings and denticulated brick cornices.

It was added to the National Register of Historic Places in 2004.
