= Mark Center Building =

United States military installation and office building in Alexandria, Virginia

Coordinates: 38.8303°N 77.1163°W

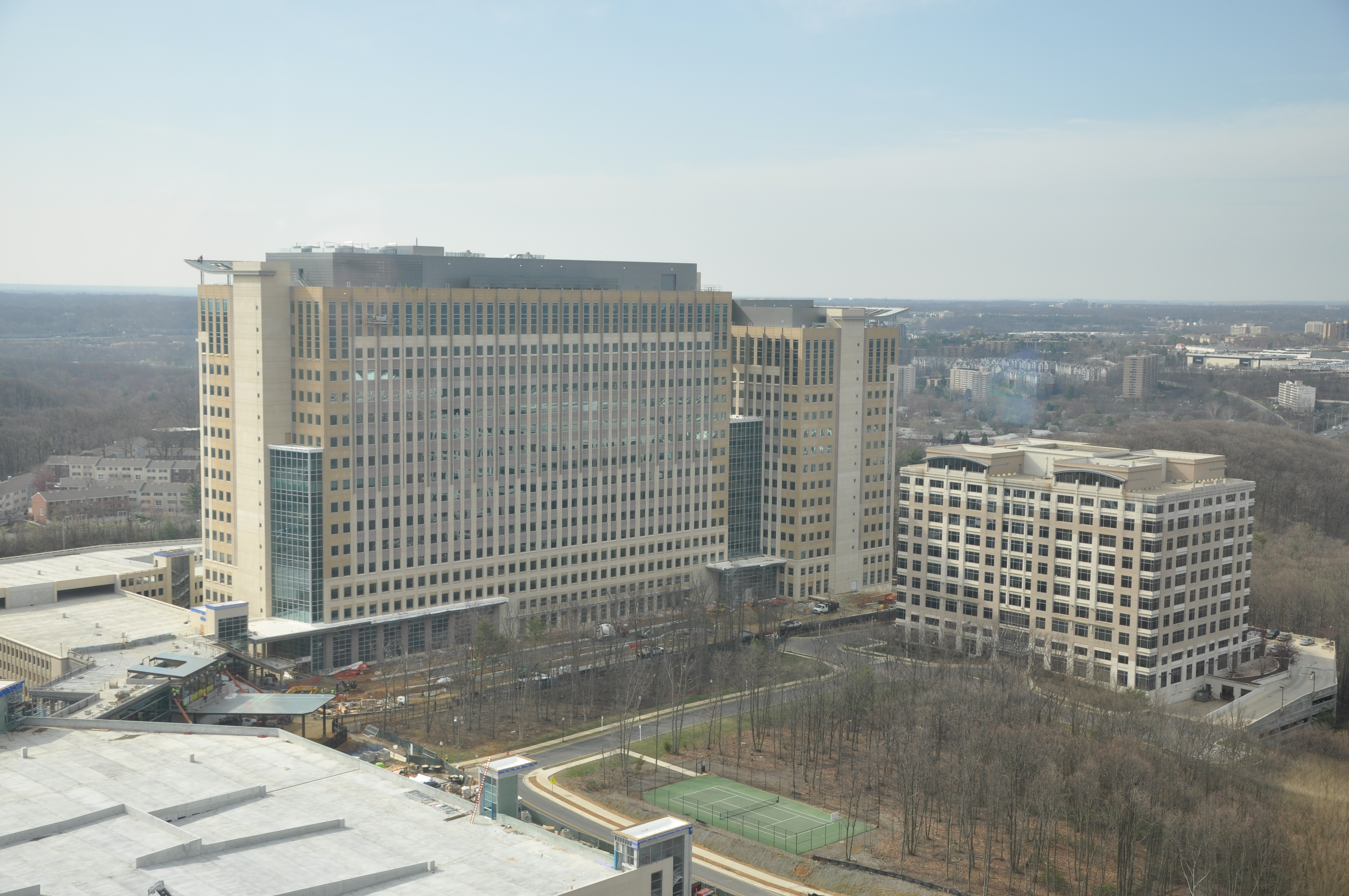
Mark Center Building (left) and Institute for Defense Analyses Headquarters (right)

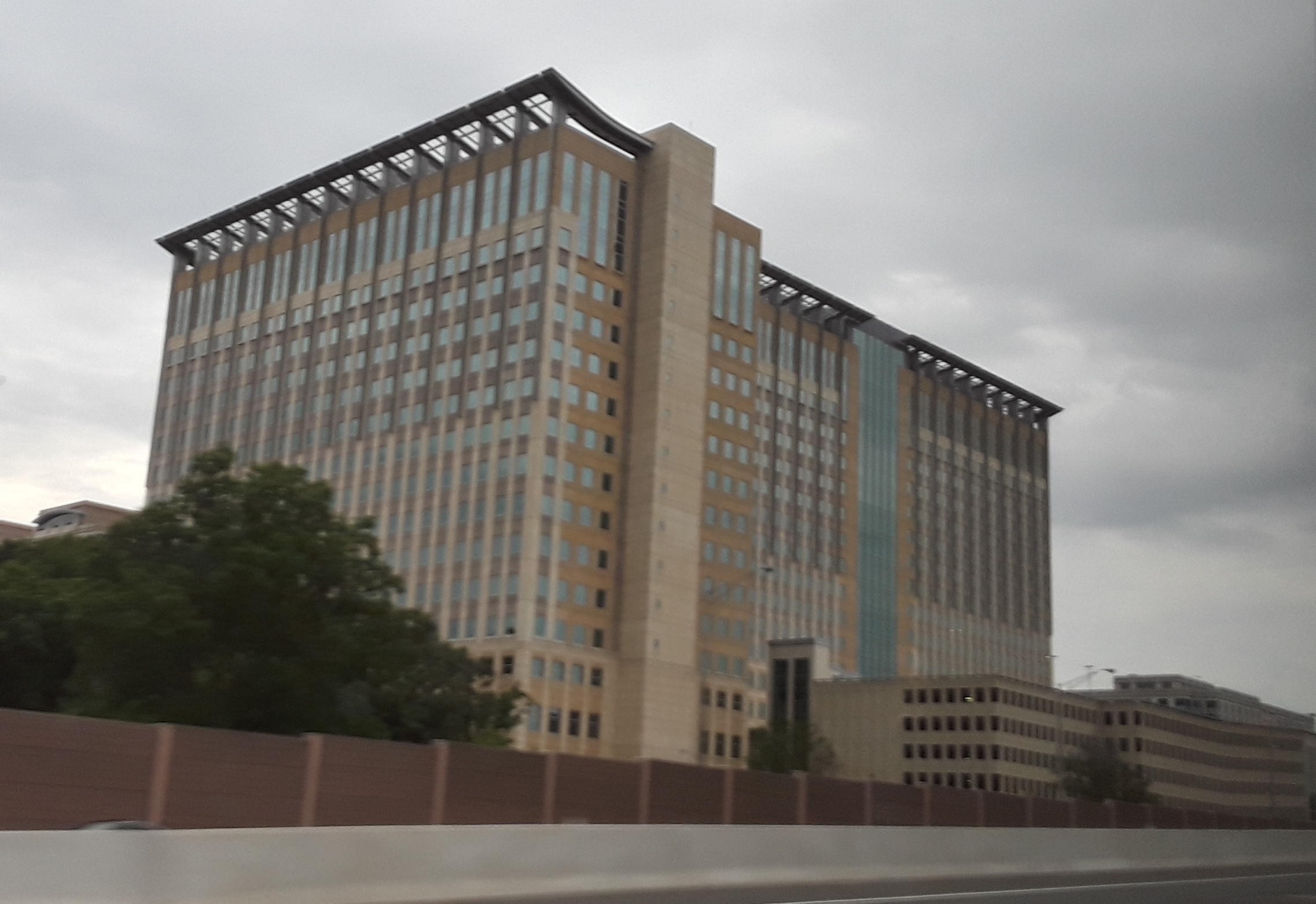
The Mark Center Building seen from Interstate 395

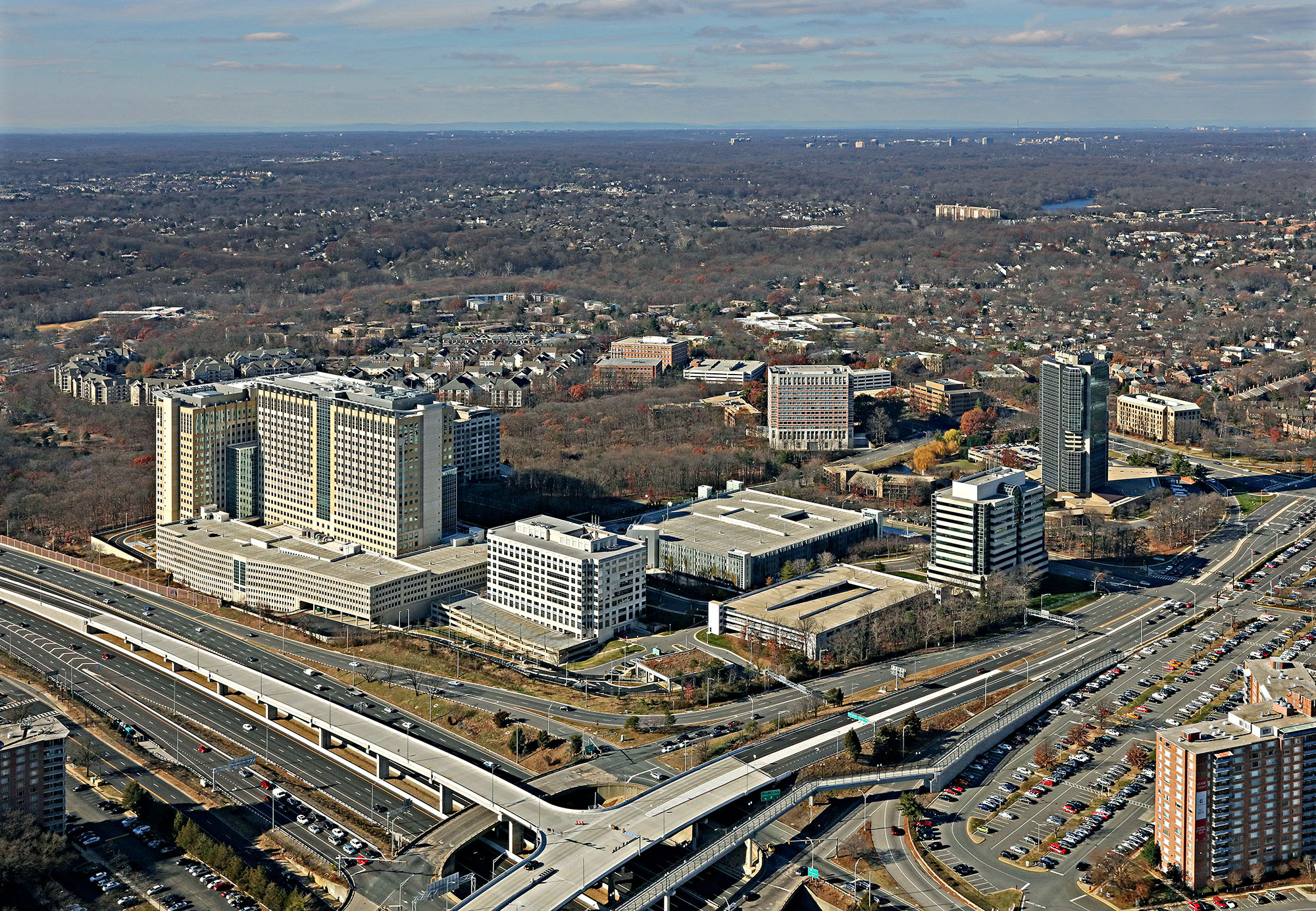
Mark Center Building in Alexandria VA

The Mark Center Building is a United States military installation and office building in Alexandria, Virginia. It is operated by the Washington Headquarters Services (WHS) of the United States Department of Defense (DoD) and provides office space for several other DoD agencies. The name of the site refers to the "Mark Center" property development, which is located at the intersection of Seminary Road and Beauregard Street at the Interstate 395 interchange.

Sixteen acres of the site were sold to the federal government and are administratively considered part of Fort Belvoir. It is the tallest building constructed by the Army Corps of Engineers.

== History ==
The site was selected in September 2008 as a result of the 2005 round of Base Realignment and Closure (BRAC), and is also referred to as BRAC-133. The 2005 BRAC process mandated a move of many DoD offices from leased office space to secure sites that could meet DoD's high anti-terrorism security standards.

Federal employees began moving to the Mark Center in August 2011, with the move scheduled to be completed by January 2013. The project has been controversial in the region because of potential traffic impacts: many of the approximately 6,500 employees who relocated to the site were formerly located in Metro-accessible locations such as Crystal City, Virginia, and office buildings in Washington, D.C., itself, but must commute by car or bus to the new site via a highway that already handled 200,000 vehicles per day.
