= Alfred Street Baptist Church =

Historic church in Virginia, United States

- U.S. National Register of Historic Places
- Virginia Landmarks Register
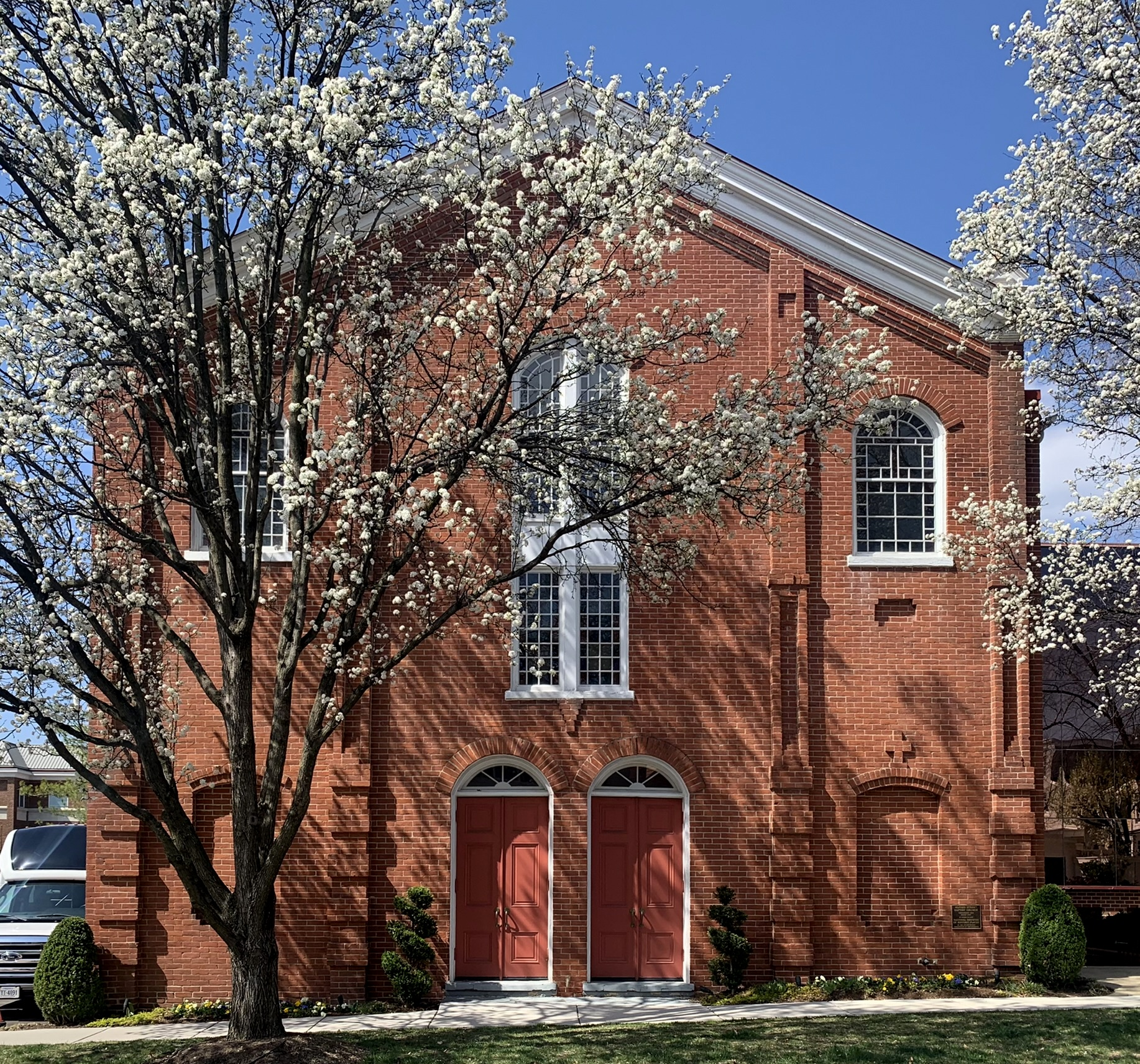
- The first sanctuary of the Alfred Street Baptist Church

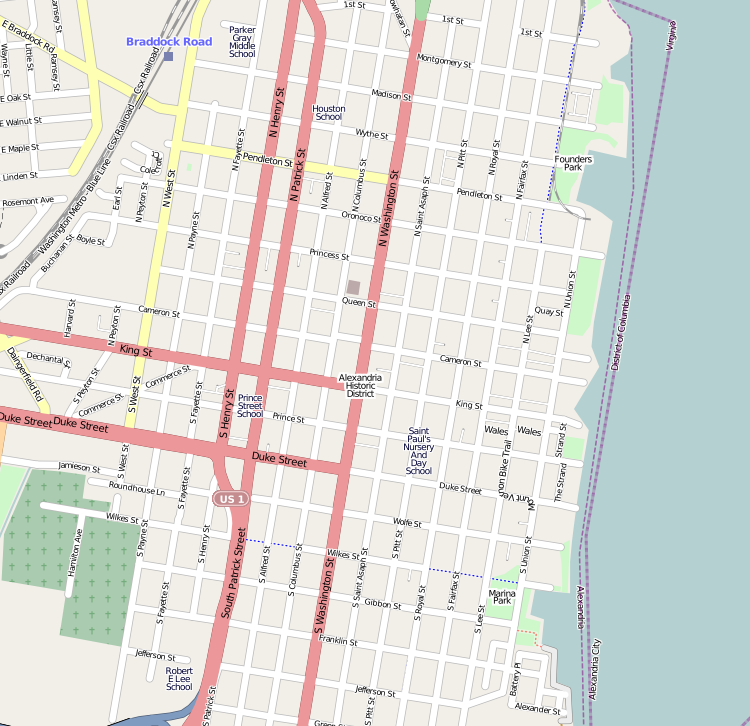
- Location within Alexandria Historical District Location within Virginia Location within the United States
- Location: 301 S. Alfred Street, Alexandria, Virginia
- Coordinates: 38°48′16″N 77°3′0″W
- Built: 1818
- Architectural style: Mid 19th Century Revival
- MPS: African American Historic Resources of Alexandria, Virginia MPS
- NRHP reference No.: 03001423
- VLR No.: 100-5015-0001

Significant dates
- Added to NRHP: January 16, 2004
- Designated VLR: September 10, 2003

The Alfred Street Baptist Church is a historic Baptist church located in Alexandria, Virginia, United States. It is affiliated with the National Baptist Convention, USA.

== History ==
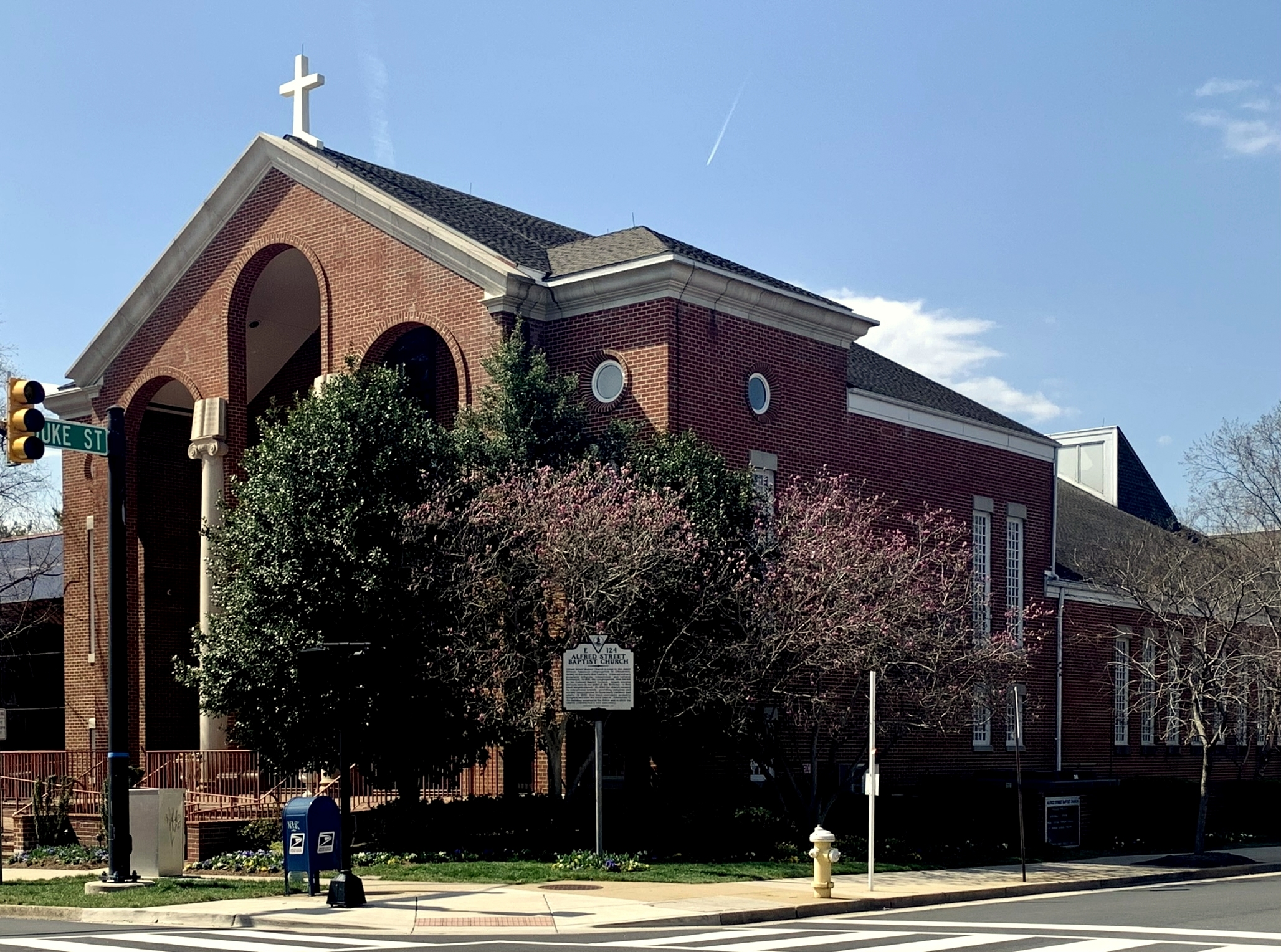
The exterior of the church in 2022.

In 1806, members of the Alexandria Baptist Society established the Colored Baptist Society, which would eventually become the First African Baptist Church of Alexandria, Virginia. During this time, the Reverend William Evans served as the church's first leader.

In 1859, the church welcomed the Reverend Sampson White who was called to lead the recently independent congregation. White previously served as the founding pastor of the Nineteenth Street Baptist Church of Washington, D.C. and the Abyssinian Baptist Church of New York City. In the midst of the Civil War in 1863, the Reverend Samuel Madden was commissioned to succeed White. Madden led the congregation for a period of 33 years in what would form a lineage of African American leadership throughout the church's history.

Architectural improvements were first made to the church in the 1880s and again in 1994 when a new sanctuary was constructed. The exterior of the building was preserved while significant improvements were made to the church's interior. The Alfred Street Baptist Church is located at 301 South Alfred Street in Alexandria, Virginia.

== Beliefs ==
The Church has a Baptist confession of faith and is a member of the National Baptist Convention, USA.

== See also ==
- National Register of Historic Places listings in Alexandria, Virginia
