= Dharampal Satyapal Group =

Indian conglomerate

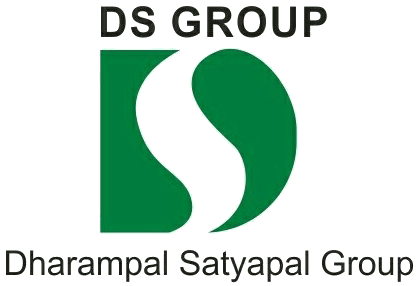
- Company Logo
- Type: Private
- Industry: Conglomerate company
- Founded: 1929; 97 years ago
- Founders: Dharampal Sugandhi; Satyapal Sugandhi
- Headquarters: Noida, Uttar Pradesh, India
- Area served: Worldwide
- Key people: Ravinder Kumar (Chairman); Rajiv Kumar (Vice-chairman)
- Products: Food and beverages, tobacco, and hotels
- Brands: BABA; Birthright; Catch; Chingles; FRU; Kewal; Ksheer; Lalique Group; L'Opéra; Le Marche; Namah; Nature’s Miracle and Not Just Nuts (NJN); Pass Pass; Pulse; Pulse Natkaare; Rajnigandha; Snack Factory; The Manu Maharani; Tulsi; UnCafe
- Revenue: ₹5,500 crore (US$570 million) (2023)
- Subsidiaries: List: Dharampal Satyapal Limited; Dharampal Premchand Limited; Dharampal Satyapal Sons Private Limited; DS Foods Ltd; DS Spiceco Private Limited; DS Chewing Products LLP; DS (Assam) Hospitality Limited; Kolkata Hotels Limited; Manu Maharani Hotels Limited; DS Namah Hospitality Private Limited; DS Jaipur Hospitality Private Limited; DS Green Agrotech Private Limited; DS Global PTE Ltd; Nature’s Miracle LLP; DS Drinks & Beverages Private Limited
- Website: www.dsgroup.com

The Dharampal Satyapal Group (DS Group) is a privately held Indian FMCG conglomerate. Established in 1929, and headquartered in Noida, Uttar Pradesh. The company operates across multiple sectors including food and beverages, confectionery, tobacco, hospitality, and luxury retail.

== History ==
The company was founded in 1929 by Dharampal Sugandhi in Chandni Chowk, Delhi, as a perfumery business producing incense sticks, rose water, and tobacco products. In 1958, Satyapal Sugandhi introduced the BABA tobacco brand.

During the 1980s, the group diversified into packaged foods with the launch of Catch Salt & Pepper (1987), followed by Catch Natural Spring Water in 1999. The group's subsequent launches included confectionery products under brands such as Rajnigandha, Pass Pass, and Pulse Candy.

In 2019, the DS Group acquired an 11–18% stake in the Switzerland-based Lalique Group . In 2023, it introduced the Swiss chocolate brand Läderach to India and acquired the Indian confectionery brand LuvIt.

== Controversies ==
=== Plastic packaging violation case ===
In 2011, the Supreme Court of India issued a contempt notice to Dharampal Satyapal Limited for allegedly violating a ban on the use of plastic sachets for selling products. A representative from the Centre for Public Interest Litigation, the non-governmental organisation that originally filed the petition, claimed that the company attempted to circumvent the ban by labeling plastic-packaged products as "for export only," while they were instead sold domestically.

=== Tax evasion ===
In 2015, officials from the Directorate General of Central Excise Intelligence conducted searches at 25 locations of DS Group's companies across several states, based on gathered intelligence. The investigation revealed that fake invoices for declared goods, labelled as "sandalwood compound or oil", were issued to Messrs Dharampal Satyapal Limited through dummy factories in the Haridwar–Roorkee area, Kanpur, and Lucknow. Owners of these front supplier firms admitted to generating bills for DSL on a commission basis without manufacturing or obtaining clearance for declared goods. Allegedly, DS Group evaded taxes by claiming inadmissible Cenvat credit, totaling ₹90 crore (US$9.3 million).

In 2019, the company was involved in a ₹900 crore (US$93 million) scam, which revolved around the avoidance of value-added tax (VAT) on tobacco products. According to the state Criminal Investigation Department, the directors of Dharmpal Satyapal Limited and the Gujarat trade were implicated in importing gutka and other tobacco products into the state without proper documentation, selling them in the market, and thereby avoiding the payment of VAT.

=== Sealing of the Guwahati factory ===
In 2022, the Mumbai Crime Branch closed down the company's Guwahati facility after discovering that a Pan masala product produced by the company in Guwahati was found in the possession of a dealer in Solapur (Maharashtra), where the manufacturing, selling, and storage of Pan masala are prohibited. However, within two weeks, the factory was de-sealed following a Guwahati High Court order.

== Litigation ==
In 2016, the Supreme Court imposed a fine of ₹4 crore (US$420,000) on Dharampal Satyapal Limited for breaching commitments and causing delays in resolving a 2009 tax dispute. The company contested a ₹244 crore (US$25 million) tax demand related to Central Excise Duty, briefly applied to the Settlement Commission without reaching an agreement, and later faced dismissal of its petition by the Delhi High Court. DSL subsequently sought relief from the Supreme Court in 2013, securing a stay order against the tax demand.
