= Steven Guttman =

American real estate developer

- Education: Mercersburg Academy; University of Pittsburgh; George Washington University Law
- Employer(s): Federal Realty Investment Trust (1972 – 2003); Storage Deluxe (2003 - 2013); UOVO Fine Art Storage (2013 – present)
- Board member of: American Centre Pompiduo Foundation
- Honours: Legion of Honour

Steven Guttman is an American real estate developer and art collector. Guttman was chairman and CEO of Federal Realty Investment Trust and led the company as CEO from 1980 until his departure in early 2003. Guttman founded Storage Deluxe when he began investing in self-storage in 1998. He also founded UOVO Fine Art Storage in 2013.

Guttman joined the American Friends of the Centre Pompidou Foundation in 2007, becoming chairman of the organization in 2012. In 2016, Guttman was named a Chevalier of the Legion of Honour by the French Government for his work with the foundation.

== Early life ==
Guttman grew up in Charleroi, Pennsylvania and attended Mercersburg Academy, where he graduated from high school in 1964. He then attended the University of Pittsburgh, graduating in 1968. He went on to pursue a juris doctor degree at George Washington University Law School, graduating with honors in 1972.

== Career ==
=== Early career ===
After graduating from law school, Guttman accepted a position with Federal Realty Investment Trust. He became COO of the Maryland-based real estate investment trust in 1978 as well as a managing trustee in 1979. In 1980, he was also appointed the president of the company.

During Guttman's tenure, the company expanded beyond the Mid-Atlantic states. In the 1980s, Guttman and Federal Realty also developed Bethesda Row, a shopping district in Bethesda, Maryland with an emphasis on restaurants, as well as Pentagon Row, a mix of retail and residential space in Pentagon City, Virginia. In 2001, Guttman was appointed chairman while still CEO of the company.

Santana Row is perhaps the largest project Guttman has undertaken. The mixed-use development in San Jose, California represented a significant investment of the company's equity. Due in part to criticism of his handling of this project, in March 2002, Guttman announced his plans to resign upon completion of Santana Row. On August 19, 2002, a fire at Santana Row damaged over a hundred residential properties, delaying the opening of the project. According to officials, "it was the costliest in San Jose's history." Guttman had moved to the city to oversee the completion of the project. He was on hand to call emergency services and witness the destruction the fire wrought. Guttman retired from his career at Federal Realty in early 2003 after 22 as CEO. Despite the problems faced by project, Santana Row was a successful project with high yields for Federal Realty and good revenue for the retail tenants.

Guttman founded Storage Deluxe when he began investing in self-storage in 1998. Storage Deluxe builds and own self storage properties and has developed dozens of properties in the New York city metro area. In 2011 Storage Deluxe sold 22 of its facilities to CubeSmart for $560 million. The facilities ranged in size from 50,000 – 165,000 square feet for a total of 1.6 million square feet. In 2019, Storage Deluxe announced it had acquired a site in East Williamsburg, New York with plans to erect a 220,000 square foot facility in a $100 million development. In October 2020, CubeSmart announced the acquisition of eight additional self-storage properties in New York City from Storage Deluxe for $540 million.

Later career in the art industry

Guttman's interest in the arts began while he was living in the Georgetown neighborhood of Washington, D.C., where he first began collecting French and English furniture which he admired while visiting the local shops near his home. Although he acquired a few pieces of artwork and furniture during that time, he only began to grow his art collection in earnest in the latter part of his career as a developer and after retirement from Federal Realty. Sometime in the late 1990s or early 2000s, Guttman and his wife Kathy Guttman became interested in what is considered France's version of Arte Povera, an Italian term for the post-World War II contemporary art movement that reused debris and scraps as its medium for art. They began collecting the works of the early originators of this movement such as André-Pierre Arnal and others. According to The Wall Street Journal, "the Guttmans' collection of [these artists’] work ranks among the world's best."

In 2006 realizing that his large art collection was in need of a proper storage space and learning that such a space was hard to find, Guttman built a fine art storage facility in Bronx, New York. The storage space was housed on the top two floors of a building owned by the Storage Deluxe Management Corporation, a company he founded.

In January 2013, Guttman founded UOVO Fine Art Storage, because he felt the demand for art storage far exceeded the capacity at the Bronx facility, and because he believed he could improve on existing art-storage options with a facility purpose-built to receive and protect fine art. UOVO specializes in safeguarding high-value fine art, fashion, interior design, and archival collections.. The company operates four facilities in the New York City area and stored in its facilities are numerous notable works of art and memorabilia from the fine art, music, entertainment and fashion industries. The company is named after uovo, the Italian word for egg and evokes the fragility of art. UOVO announced that it would build its first purpose-built art storage facility in Long Island City, Queens. The pair of buildings on 22nd Street which make up the 280,000-square-foot facility near Queens Plaza opened in 2014. The facility built from the ground-up features about 500 storage spaces and private viewing rooms, strict security, as well as advanced cataloging and indexing. The company offers suites customized for individual collections, workspaces for curators and conservators, as well as specialized transportation services for artwork. Its clients include museums and wealthy individual collectors, but also foundations, galleries, financial institutions, fashion designers who need to store vintage clothing and fabrics, and nonprofit groups.

In December 2014, Guttman purchased a warehouse facility in Orangeburg, New York. The 106,141-square-foot facility located at 33 Kings Highway sits on a thirteen-acre lot. In February 2017, the company opened its third facility, the second in Rockland County. The renovated 140,000-square-foot facility sits on a 9-acre property located at 100 Bradley Parkway in Blauvelt, a subdivision of Orangetown, New York.

In 2015, Guttman expanded his team, bringing on Steve Novenstein as the chief executive of UOVO. With expansion of space and team, Guttman attracted high-level clients to UOVO, including many notables in the art and fashion world. The Rubin Museum of Art in New York, a notable client, utilizes UOVO’s facilities as an auxiliary storage space for its collections. Although UOVO seldom discloses the items stored in its facilities, the fashion designer Oscar de la Renta has stored his collection with UOVO since 2016. Spanning decades of work, de la Renta's designs are housed, cataloged, and sometimes showcased at UOVO, providing the designer's archivist opportunity to peruse the collection when necessary. UOVO also stores the collections of other notables in the fashion industry, among them PVH Corp.—owners of Calvin Klein Inc.—and the Tommy Hilfiger Group. In 2018, UOVO acquired a 150,000-square-foot facility in the Bushwick neighborhood of Brooklyn, NY.

In 2019, Guttman and his team at UOVO joined forces with the Brooklyn Museum to create the UOVO Prize, an award recognizing the work of emerging Brooklyn-based artists. In 2019, the inaugural UOVO Prize was awarded to John Edmonds. In 2020, the second annual UOVO prize was awarded to Baseera Khan. In 2022, the third annual UOVO Prize was awarded to Oscar yi Hou.

In March 2022, Guttman and the UOVO team announced its expansion to Palm Beach, Florida, with the assistance of the Business Development Board of Palm Beach County. The new expansion will occupy a 50,000-square-foot (4,600 m^{2}) facility at 4200 Westgate Avenue. Later that month, UOVO announced its expansion to Dallas, Texas, in partnership with the art collector Howard Rachofsky and art advisor John Runyon. Rachofsky and Runyon renovated an existing Irving building to house the operation. The new acquisition is a 85,000-square-foot facility, located just north of Dallas in Las Colinas.

Beyond his involvement in the art world through UOVO, since late 2011, Guttman has been on the board of the Miami Art Museum, now known as Pérez Art Museum Miami. The museum, which is partly supported by public funds, began construction on a new facility paid in part by a large cash donation from Jorge M. Pérez. In recognition of this contribution, the museum was to be renamed Jorge M. Pérez Art Museum of Miami-Dade County. Guttman and three other board members resigned in protest of the name change.

Guttman also ison the board of the American Friends of the Centre Pompidou Foundation. He first joined the organization in 2007. In July 2012, he was appointed the chairman of the organization after the resignation of Robert Rubin, the previous chairman. In May 2016, Gérard Araud, the French ambassador to the United States, presented to Guttman the honor of Chevalier de la Légion d’Honneur, the civilian Legion of Honour award. In the private award ceremony at the French ambassador's residence in Washington, D.C., Araud stated that they "continue to benefit from Mr. Guttman’s relentless commitment to strengthening the bridge of ideas and talent between the U.S. and France. I applaud his efforts and congratulate him on an honor well deserved."

== Personal life ==
Steven and Kathy Guttman live in Greenwich Village They own four homes that house some of their more than 1,000 objects of art and design, including their primary residence in Miami as well as residences in the SoHo neighborhood of New York City, in Paris, France and in Washington, CT. Their Washington CT home, named the “Rocks”, was the residence of architect Ehrick Rossiter.

In 2017, they donated $2 million to the University of Pittsburgh Football program, the single largest donation to the program's Championship Fund. The donation was specifically earmarked for his alma mater's football program.
