= Pentagon City (disambiguation) =

Pentagon City may refer to:

- Pentagon City, Arlington, Virginia, a neighborhood in Arlington County, Virginia
- Pentagon City (WMATA station), a Washington Metro station serving the Pentagon City neighborhood
- The Fashion Centre at Pentagon City, a.k.a. "Pentagon City Mall", a large shopping mall adjacent to the Pentagon City Metro station
