= Mythen Center =

Swiss shopping centre

- Location: Ibach, Switzerland
- Coordinates: 47.015°N 8.646°E
- Address: Mythen-Centerstrasse 15, 6438 Ibach
- Opened: 16 March 1972; 54 years ago
- Owner: Mythencenter AG
- Num. of stores: 56
- Floor area: 19,930 square metres (214,500 sq ft)
- Floors: 3
- Parking: 1050
- Public transit: Ibach, Mythen Center: 501, 502, 503, 508, 531, 532
- Website: www.mythen-center.ch (in German)
- Revenue: 175 Mio. SFr (2019)

The Mythen Center is a shopping centre located in Ibach, a village in the municipality of Schwyz. It opened in 1972 as the third shopping centre in Switzerland and was expanded in 1980 and 2000. Opened by Reinhold Camenzind, it is still a family business currently led in third generation by Mario Camenzind. It is one of the biggest shopping centres in Central Switzerland and the second biggest in the canton of Schwyz, after the Seedamm-Center. In 2010 it was considered the 18 biggest in the country.
