= Kiesen Castle =

- Schloss Kiesen
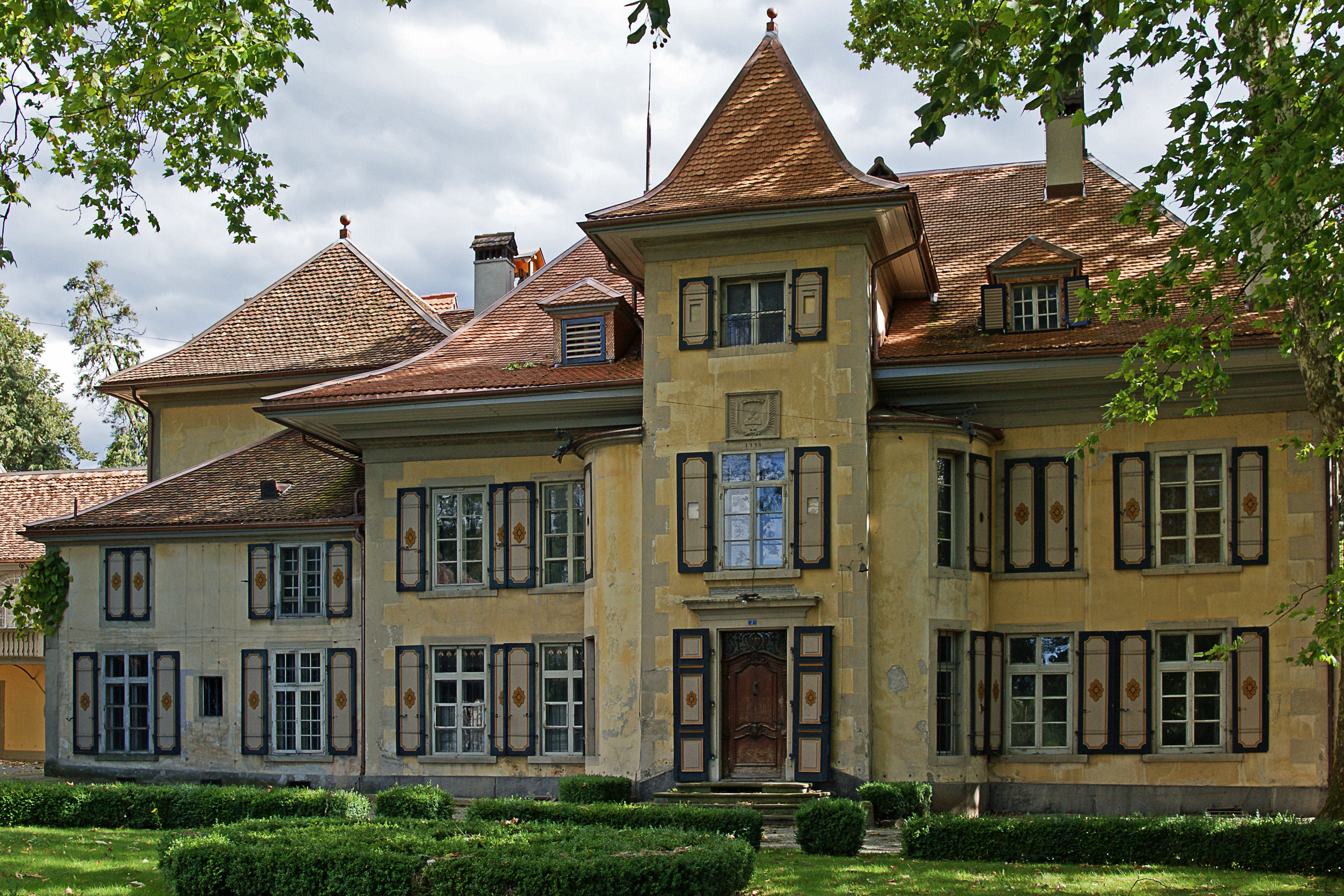

General information
- Location: Bernstrasse 11, 3629 Kiesen, Switzerland
- Coordinates: 46.8201°N 7.5875°E
- Year built: 1668
- Owner: Lädrach family

Kiesen Castle (German: Schloss Kiesen) is a castle located in Kiesen in the Canton of Bern in Switzerland. The castle was built in the 17th century for the Effinger family, of lower nobility, in the place of a ruin of a fort in same place. Ever since it has been in the hands of numerous private people that used it as primary residence, notably it was owned by the family and descendants of Ruggero Dollfus.

== Notable owners and occupants ==
- Rudolf Emanuel Effinger (von Wildegg), until 1830
- Thomas Southwell Pigott and Cécile Josephine Pigott (née von Steiger)
- Robert Pigott
- Henri Gaullieur and Sophie Gaullieur (née von Lentulus)
- Alexandre August Catoire de Bioncourt, 1900–1915
- Roger Dollfus de Volckersberg, colloquially Ruggero Dollfus, 1915–1948
- Annie Elisabeth Dollfus de Volckersberg (née Burckhardt), 1948–1983 (last individual permanent occupant)

The castle has been empty for over 20 years after Annie Elisabeth Dollfus de Volckersberg died in 1983. In 1995, the castle and estate were purchased by Daepp Ltd., a local quarry company from Oppligen, owned by the Lädrach family (not to be confused with the Läderach family).

- Chantal Michel, an artist from Thun, 2008–2011.
