= Uovo =

American art storage company

UOVO Fine Art Storage
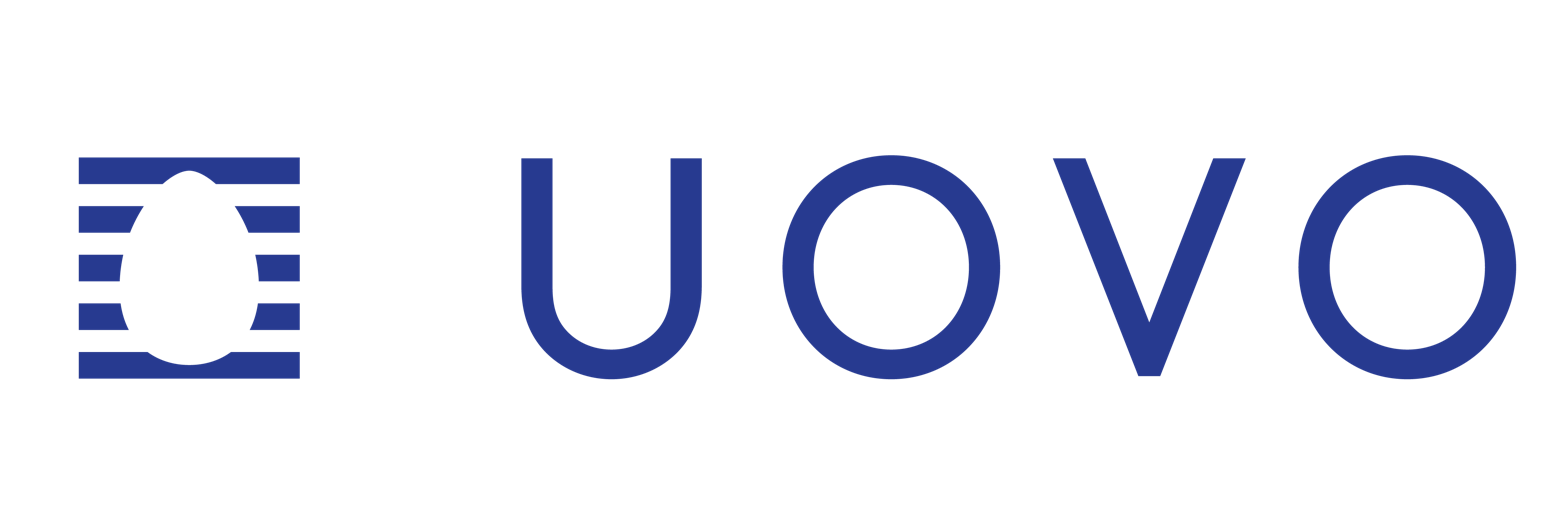
- Company type: Private
- Industry: Art, storage
- Founded: January 2013; 12 years ago in Long Island City, New York
- Founder: Steven Guttman; Steve Novenstein
- Headquarters: Queens Plaza 41-54 22nd Street, Long Island City, New York, U.S.
- Key people: Steven Guttman (Chairman); John Auerbach (CEO)
- Website: uovo.art

UOVO Fine Art Storage (stylized as UOVO) is a New York City-based art storage space provider that specializes in safeguarding high-value fine art, fashion, interior design, and archival collections. The company operates three facilities in the New York City area and stored in its facilities are numerous notable works of art and memorabilia from the fine art, music, entertainment and fashion industries.

== History ==
UOVO was established in January 2013 by Steven Guttman, an art collector and real-estate developer, and Steve Novenstein. The company is named uovo in homage to the Italian word for egg. In 2006, Guttman opened his first fine-art storage facility in the Bronx, New York on the top two floors of a building owned by Storage Deluxe, his other business. Guttman founded UOVO because he felt the demand for art storage far exceeded the capacity of the Bronx facility, and believed he could improve existing art-storage options by creating a purpose-built space to receive and protect fine art.

In early 2013, UOVO announced that it would construct its first purpose-built art storage facility in Long Island City, Queens. The pair of buildings on 22nd Street—which make up the 280,000-square-foot (26,000 m^{2}) facility near Queens Plaza—opened in 2014. The facility, built from the ground up, features about 500 storage spaces and private viewing rooms, strict security, as well as advanced cataloging and indexing services. The company offers suites customized for individual collections, workspaces for curators and conservators, as well as specialized transportation services for artwork.

In December 2014, UOVO purchased a warehouse facility in Orangeburg, New York. The 106,141-square-foot (9,860.8 m^{2}) facility located at 33 Kings Highway sits on a thirteen-acre (5.3 ha) lot. In February 2017, the company opened its third facility, the second in Rockland County. The renovated 140,000-square-foot (13,000 m^{2}) facility sits on a nine-acre (3.6 ha) property located at 100 Bradley Parkway in Blauvelt, a subdivision of Orangetown, New York.

The Rubin Museum of Art in New York, a notable client, utilizes UOVO's facilities as an auxiliary storage space for its collections. Although UOVO seldom discloses the items stored in its facilities, the fashion designer Oscar de la Renta has stored his collection with UOVO since 2016. Spanning decades of work, de la Renta's designs are housed, cataloged, and sometimes showcased at UOVO, providing the designer's archivist opportunity to peruse the collection when necessary. UOVO also stores the collections of other notables in the fashion industry, among them PVH Corp.—owner of Calvin Klein Inc.and the Tommy Hilfiger Group. In 2018, UOVO acquired a 150,000-square-foot (14,000 m^{2}) in the Bushwick neighborhood of Brooklyn, New York.
