= Pass Pass Pulse =

Hard-boiled candy

- Product type: Confectionery
- Current owner: Dharampal Satyapal Foods Ltd.
- Country: India
- Introduced: 2015
- Markets: India & overseas countries
- Website: dsgroup.com

Pass Pass Pulse (trade name: Pulse Candy) is a hard-boiled candy manufactured by Dharampal Satyapal Foods Ltd., a subsidiary of the Indian conglomerate Dharampal Satyapal Group. Launched in 2015, the candy is flavored with raw mango and contains a tangy, spiced filling.

== History ==
Pulse Candy was developed by DS Group’s product team between 2013 and 2015. It was test-marketed in April 2015 in Rajasthan, Gujarat, and Delhi, with later expansions into Maharashtra. The candy was priced at ₹1 per unit, double the price of many competitors’ products at the time. Initial production relied on contract manufacturers in Hyderabad, Rudrapur, Ahmedabad, and Jamnagar.

New flavors, including Guava and Orange, were introduced in 2016, followed by Pineapple and Litchi. In 2019, the brand launched Pulse Shots, a smaller variant, and expanded into snacks with Pulse Natkaare (2021) and a tamarind-flavored product (2024).

== Operations ==
Pulse Candy generated ₹100 crore in sales during its first year (2015). By 2017, sales reportedly reached ₹300 crore, and the product entered international markets such as the U.S., UK, and Singapore. As of 2024, DS Group’s confectionery division, which includes Pulse Candy, claims an annual turnover exceeding ₹1,000 crore.

== Case studies ==
- Varma, Sanjay (2022). Introducing a New Candy: Development of a Marketing Plan by the DS Group (Report). IIM Ahmedabad Case Centre.
