= Seedamm-Center =

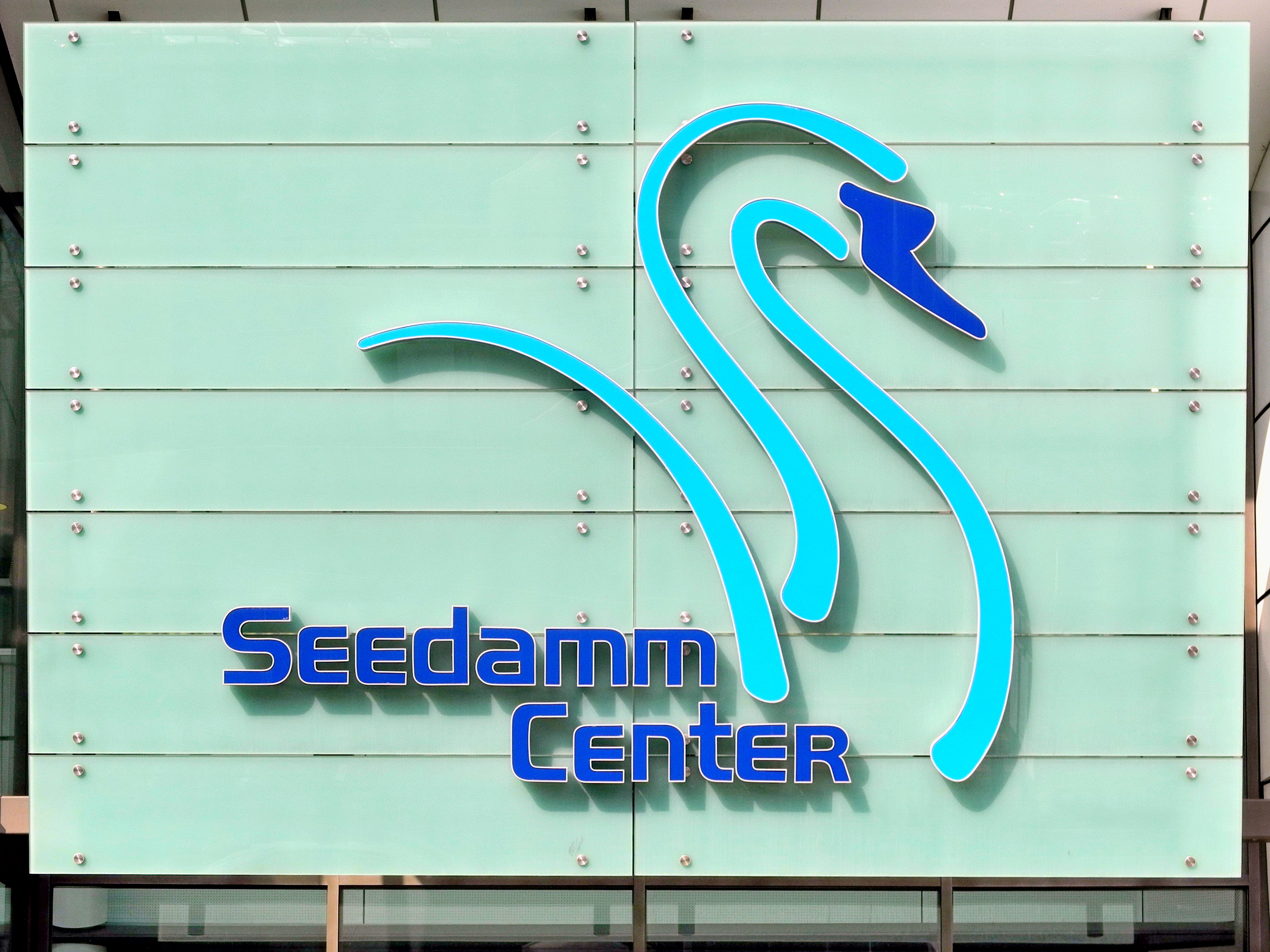
- Logo as of 2014
- Location: Pfäffikon
- Coordinates: 47.201963°N 8.791013°E
- Address: Gwattstrasse 11, CH-8808 Pfäffikon SZ
- Opened: 3 October 1974
- Developer: Charles Vögele Gruppe
- Manager: Hanspeter Gisler
- Owner: Seedamm-Immobilien AG and Migros-Genossenschaft Zürich
- Num. of stores: 49
- Floor area: 20,000 m^{2} (220,000 sq ft)
- Floors: 4
- Parking: 1500 (free of cost)
- Public transit: Pfäffikon, local bus line 195
- Website: Official website (in German)

Seedamm-Center is a subsidiary of the Swiss Vögele Group, which runs the shopping mall in the locality of Pfäffikon in the municipality of Freienbach, canton of Schwyz.

== History ==
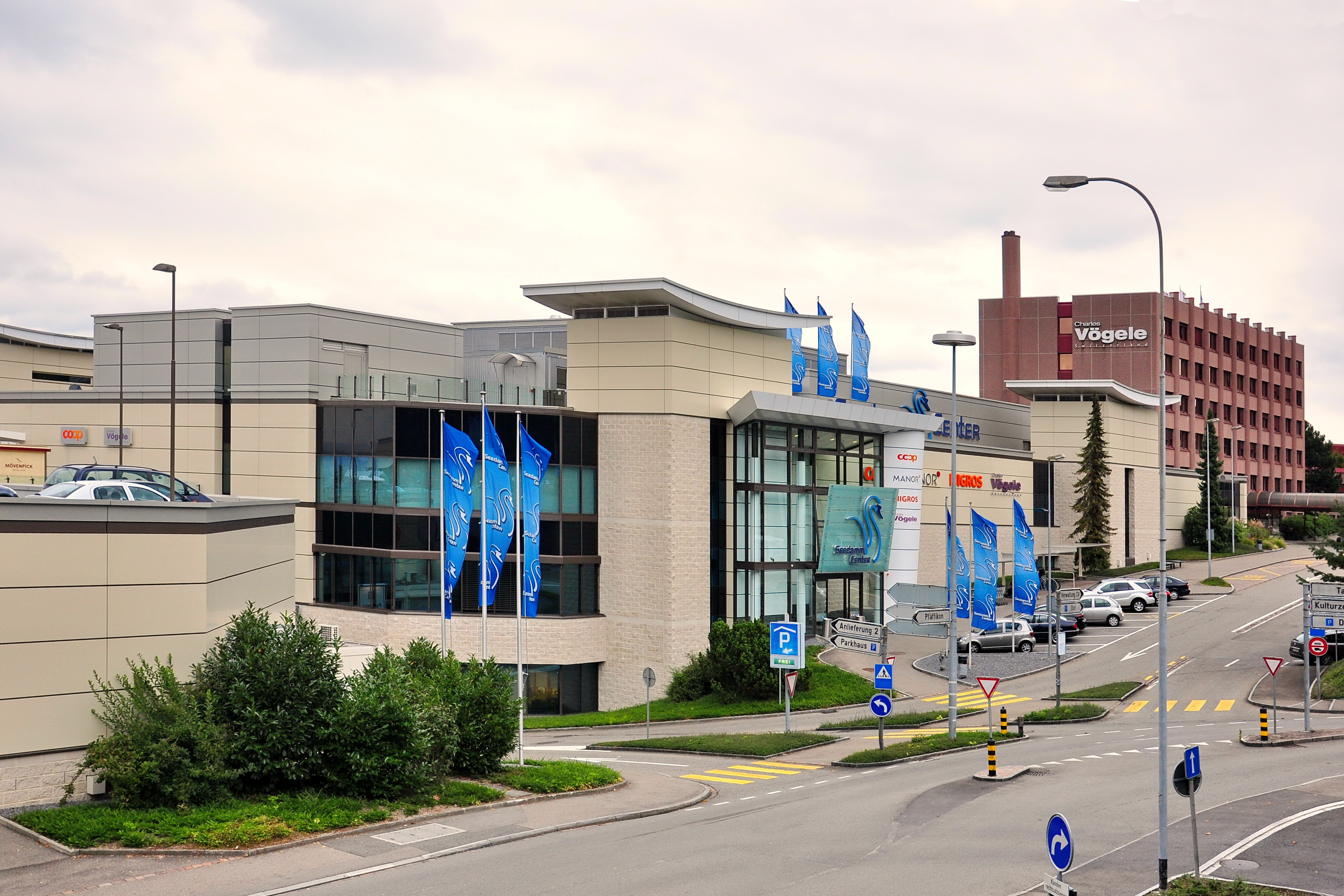
Entrance area of the second building complex, as seen from towards Alpamare, the head office of the Vögele Group is situated in the background

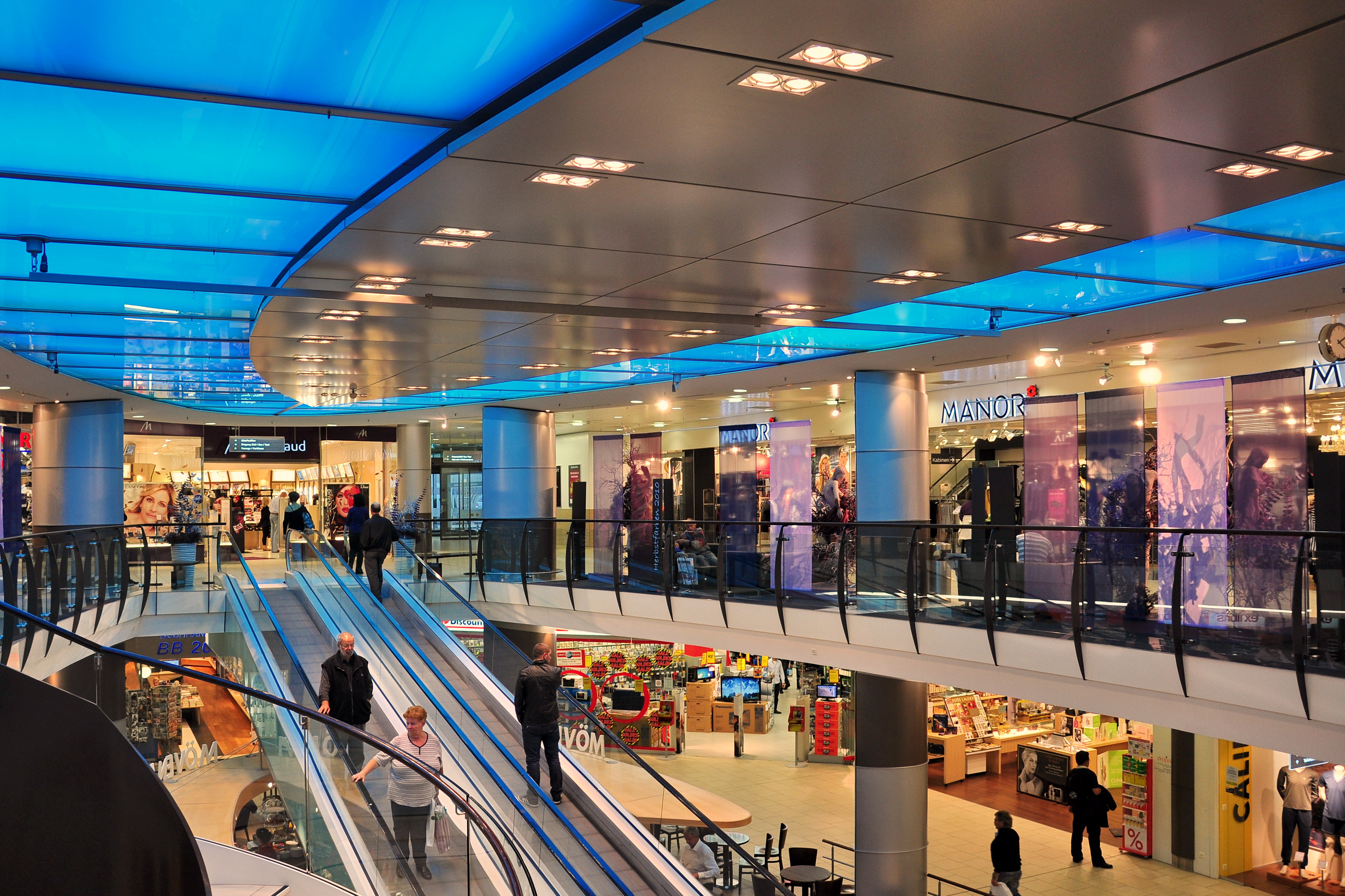
Interior of the older section of Seedammcenter

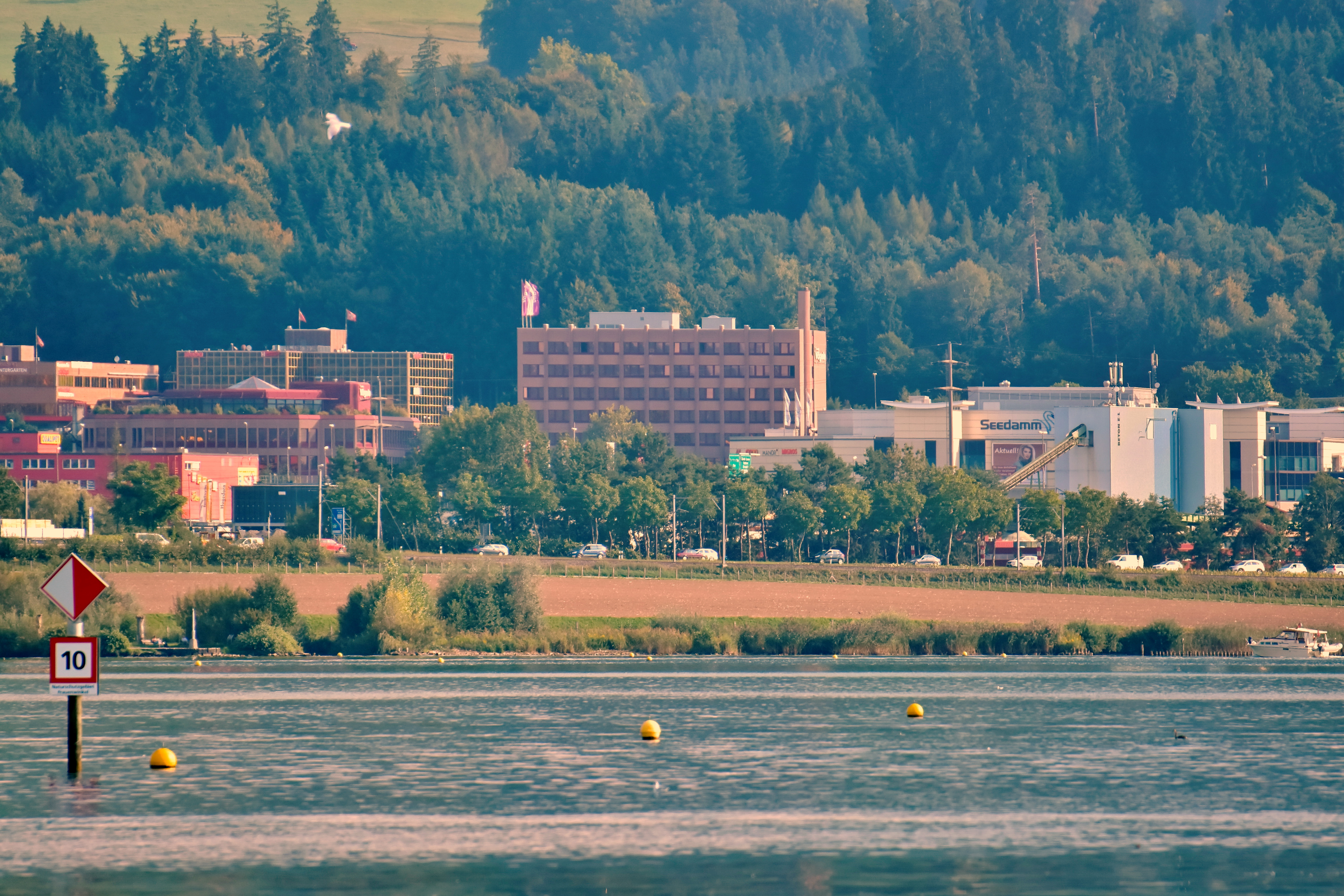
Seedamm-Center, the Vögele Group head office, the Frauenwinkel protected area, and Seedamm causeway seen from ZSG ship

Seedamm-Center is counted among the most popular shopping destinations in the greater Zurich metropolitan area. At the time of its construction in 1974, it claimed to be one of the biggest mall properties in Switzerland. In 1985, a second building complex was added, and in 2005 the mall was rebuilt to fit present standards.

In March 2012, the management announced plans for an expansion of the sales area to 40,000 m^{2} (430,000 sq ft), being the sixth largest shopping center in Switzerland in 2016. To realize these plans, the westerly Migrol area should be used, as of September 2015 still separated by a road and a meadow, to enable further shops. Among others, an OBI garden center, a new Migros store and a Migros restaurant shall be realized to 2016, as well as additional 400 underground parking facilities to amount to a total of 1,800. The new building will be connected to the existing building complex, totalling in costs of about 100 million Swiss Francs for construction and infrastructure. A Federal Court judgment of 2005 demands, among others, to establish the new facilities emission-neutral, but in 2012 the management also claimed to plan an office building and a petrol station with a shop and a new direct connection to the A3 national highway by a road bridge, built and financed by the shared owners, the Seedamm Immobilien AG and Migros-Genossenschaft Zürich. The necessary adjustments for the access to the highway had to be financed by the federal government. As of September 2014, four appeals have been filed at the federal court related to the modifications to the motorway exit Pfäffikon.

To the west of the shopping complex, the headquarter of the Charles Vögele group is situated, and to the north there's the complex of the Alpamare waterpark. The mall is named after the Seedamm area on the Lake Zurich shore between Hurden and Rapperswil-Jona. The former Seedamm Kulturzentrum (now Vögele Kultur Zentrum) was built as a separate section of the building complex.

== Vögele Kultur Zentrum ==
The Seedamm Kulturzentrum was renamed to Vögele Kultur Zentrum. The cultural center claims to provide multidisciplinary exhibitions for an audience of wide interests. So different aspects of a socially relevant subject may be discussed on the basis of art, scenic installations, everyday objects and media contributions in the exhibitions, to sensitize the visitors in an entertaining way, encouraging them to reflect as well as to discuss. Interdisciplinary projects, events, a cultural bulletin and versatile placement deals accompany all exhibitions.

The former Seedamm Kulturzentrum is listed in the Swiss inventory of cultural property of national and regional significance as a Class A object of national importance.

== Shops ==
Among others, Seedamm-Center offers the following shops:

- C&A
- Calzedonia
- Coop
- Denner
- H&M
- Kiosk
- Läderach
- Manor
- Migros
- Orell Füssli
- Sunrise
- Swarovski
- Swisscom

== Transport ==
Seedamm-Center is located along the A3 motorway between Zurich and Sargans, next to the exit for Pfäffikon and Rapperswil (Hauptstrasse 8 across the Seedamm).

The mall also lies next to the Lake Zurich left-bank railway line. The closest railway station is Pfäffikon SZ, an important junction station that is served by InterRegio (IR35, Voralpen Express) and S-Bahn (S2, S5, S8, S25, S40) trains. Bus line 195 links the railway station with Seedamm-Center.

== See also ==
- Glattzentrum
- Sihlcity
