= Ruggero Dollfus =

Swiss politician and banker

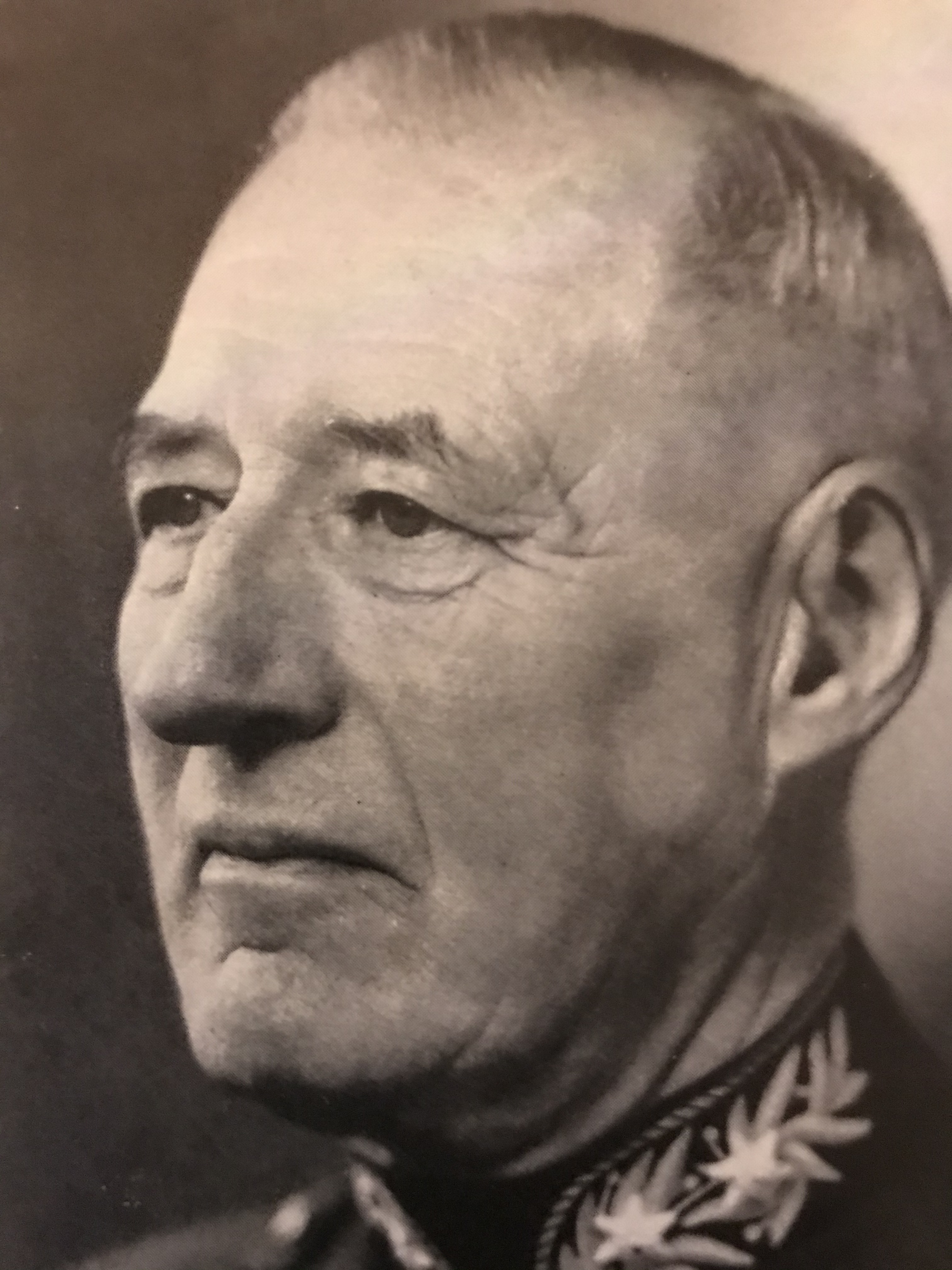
- Official portrait, 1933/34

President of the National Council (Switzerland)
- In office 1 January 1932 – 31 December 1932
- Constituency: Canton of Ticino

Member of the National Council (Switzerland)
- In office 1 October 1922 – 5 December 1943

Personal details
- Born: Roger Albert Dollfus de Volckersberg; 14 July 1876 Milan, Kingdom of Italy
- Died: 12 July 1948 (aged 71) Kiesen Castle, Kiesen, Switzerland
- Party: Christian Democratic People's Party
- Spouse: Annie Elisabeth Burckhardt (m. 1905)
- Relations: Burckhardt family (by marriage)
- Children: 4
- Education: University of Basel (PhD)
- Occupation: Banker, industrialist, military officer, politician
- Website: Parliament website

Military service
- Allegiance: Switzerland
- Years of service: 1896–1948 (his death)
- Rank: Oberstdivisionär (Brigadier general)

Roger Albert "Ruggero" Dollfus de Volckersberg (Italian pronunciation: [rudˈdʒɛːro ˈdɔlfus]; 14 July 1876 – 12 July 1948) was an Italian-born Swiss banker, industrialist, military officer and politician who most notably served on the National Council (Switzerland) between 1922 and 1943, during 1932/33 as its president, for the Christian Democratic People's Party.

== Early life and education ==
Dollfus was born 14 July 1876 in Milan, Kingdom of Italy, to Albert Louis Gaspard Dollfus de Volckersberg (1846–1909) and Laura Dollfus de Volckersberg (née Vonwiller). He had three siblings; Oscar Caspar (1875–1963), Louis Henri Jean (1877–1915) and Nelly Jeanne (1882-1969). In 1903, his sister Nelly, married Arthur Archer (1869-1937), Baron of Umberslade.

His paternal family was Protestant and originally hailed from Illzach near Mulhouse. Dollfus' paternal grandfather was Gaspard Dollfus (1812–1889) who became wealthy through spinning mills in the Grand Duchy of Baden as well as by establishing chemical plants (later Durand & Huguenin). His father would also be active in the chemical industry with co-founding the chemical works Lepetit & Dollfus in Milan. His mother hailed from a merchant family from St. Gallen with his paternal grandfather being the Consul General of Switzerland to Milan from 1870 to 1889.

In 1889, aged 13, he relocated to Castagnola in Ticino with his family. Together with his siblings he attended high school in Lugano followed by studies in economics, economics history, legal philosophy and art history at the University of Basel. He graduated summa cum laude with a PhD in 1897.

== Career ==
Upon completing his studies he entered the private banking firm of Vonwiller & Co (presently Morgan Vonwiller) in Milan, which was chaired by his maternal uncle Albert Vonwiller. Soon thereafter he took-over the management. He served on a variety of boards.

== Personal life ==
On 9 March 1905, Dollfus de Volckersberg, wed Annie Elisabeth Burckhardt (1886–1983), a daughter of Julius Burckhardt, a textile industrialist, and Elisabeth Burckhardt (née Merian), from Basel, Switzerland. She was a member of the Burckhardt and Merian family, both belonging to the Daig. They had four children;

- René Jules Albert Dollfus de Volckersberg (15 January 1906 – 10 November 1984), married to Elisabeth Catharina Herren (1895–1974)
- Gianrico Dollfus de Volckersberg (17 November 1913 – 13 May 1939), never married
- Louis Dollfus de Volckersberg (1916–1974), married to a Ms. De Grandi, two children.
- Yvonne Marianne Dollfus de Volckersberg (28 March 1921 – 29 February 2008), married to Polish-born Samuel Piotrkowski (1919–1986), three children.

In 1916, Dollfus and his family relocated to Kiesen near Bern, where he purchased Kiesen Castle. The property remained in family ownership until after the death of his wife in 1983 aged 97. Dollfus had received honorary municipal citizenship in Kiesen in 1933.
