= Westpost at National Landing =

Mixed-use shopping and residential center in Arlington, Virginia, U.S.

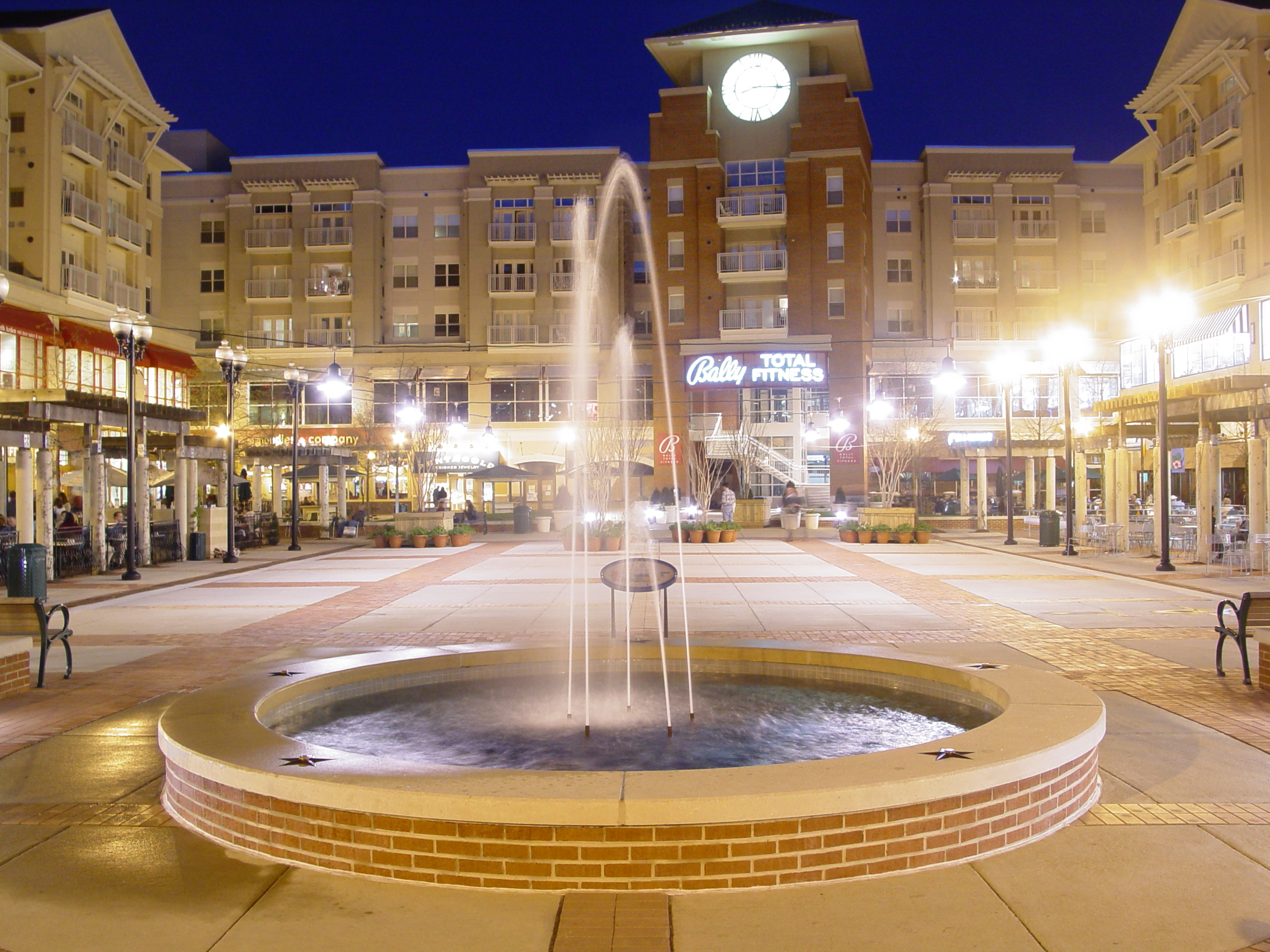
- Central area during the evening
- Location: Arlington, Virginia, United States
- Coordinates: 38°51′48.3″N 77°3′46.5″W
- Address: 1201 South Joyce Street
- Opened: 2001
- Previous names: Pentagon Row
- Developer: Federal Realty Investment Trust and Post Properties
- Owner: Federal Realty Investment Trust
- Parking: Below-grade and surface parking
- Website: westpostva.com

Westpost at National Landing is an outdoor mixed-use shopping, dining, office and residential center in the Pentagon City neighborhood of Arlington, Virginia, United States. Formerly known as Pentagon Row, it fronts South Joyce Street in the National Landing district and is adjacent to the Fashion Centre at Pentagon City. The development includes ground- and second-level retail space, residential units, parking, a central plaza, outdoor dining areas and a seasonal ice-skating rink.

The project broke ground in 1999 and major retail tenants began opening in 2001. Owner Federal Realty Investment Trust renamed Pentagon Row as Westpost at National Landing in December 2020, as the National Landing name became more prominent during development of Amazon HQ2 nearby.

== History ==
Westpost as Pentagon Row was developed by Federal Realty Investment Trust and Post Properties as a residential-over-retail project next to Pentagon City Mall. At its 1999 groundbreaking, contemporary coverage described the project as a five-story, S-shaped development with 300,000 sq ft (28,000 m^{2}) of street-level retail and 500 apartments above the commercial space. The original plan also included a winter skating rink in the central plaza, with the plaza intended to convert to cafe seating and event space during warmer months; later phases were planned to add two residential towers with 650 additional apartments.

In 2000, The Washington Post described Pentagon Row as a joint venture between Federal Realty and Atlanta-based Post Properties, with a public plaza and ice rink planned as the neighborhood center. Harris Teeter had been signed as an anchor tenant, and the 45,000 sq ft (4,200 m^{2}) grocery store and Bed Bath & Beyond were scheduled to open the following year. Federal Realty announced the opening of 17 additional stores at Pentagon Row in October 2001, after Harris Teeter and Bed Bath & Beyond had opened earlier that year. Early tenants included restaurants, service retailers, apparel stores and home-furnishing stores, including Lebanese Taverna, Starbucks, Chico's and Sur La Table.

A 2009 Washington Post article described Pentagon Row as one of the newer, denser residential-over-retail developments in Pentagon City and noted that the development included stores, restaurants, an ice-skating rink and offices.

In December 2020, Federal Realty rebranded Pentagon Row as Westpost at National Landing. ARLnow reported that the rebranding was announced while Amazon's HQ2 campus was rising nearby and that Federal Realty also announced Nighthawk Pizza as a new tenant at the center. In 2024, Federal Realty said it was completing the rebranding with new signage throughout the property.

== Design and amenities ==
The Westpost site is part of Arlington County's Pentagon City Phased Development Site Plan area. It covers 586,004 sq ft (13.4528 acres) and is generally bounded by Army Navy Drive to the north, the Fashion Centre at Pentagon City to the east, South 15th Street to the south and South Joyce Street to the west. Arlington County describes the site as a mixed-use development center with residential units, ground- and second-level retail, below-grade parking and surface parking.

The central plaza was renovated after the initial development of Pentagon Row. Arlington County's DESIGNArlington program recognized Pentagon Row Plaza with a 2013 Award of Excellence, describing the project as an open-space renovation that adapted the plaza to new uses. The county listed Mahan Rykiel Associates as landscape architect and Brown Craig Turner Architects as architect for the plaza project. BCT Design Group, the successor to Brown Craig Turner Architects, described the redesign as adding outdoor cafe areas, smaller cafe buildings and a central pedestrian lawn used for events and winter ice-skating.

The plaza includes a seasonal outdoor ice-skating rink. Federal Realty describes the rink as operating from November through March, and the Arlington Convention & Visitors Service lists the rink at 7,200 sq ft (670 m^{2}).

== Retail and residential uses ==
As of May 2026, Westpost's directory included retailers and service tenants such as Harris Teeter, Target, DSW, T.J. Maxx, Ulta Beauty, Road Runner Sports, Sur La Table, Planet Fitness, Club Pilates and F45. Its restaurant tenants included Lebanese Taverna, Nando's Peri-Peri, Nighthawk Pizza, Kusshi, Banditos, Basic Burger and Saigon Saigon.

The center's retail mix changed after the 2020 rebrand. In 2021, ARLnow reported that more than a half-dozen stores and restaurants were planned to open at Westpost, including Target, Road Runner Sports, Nighthawk Pizza, Kusshi, Banditos and Mimi's Handmade Ice Cream, and that Federal Realty said the new leases made the center fully leased. A 34,000 sq ft (3,200 m^{2}) Target opened at Westpost in April 2022 in the former Bed Bath & Beyond space.

The residential component is marketed as MAA National Landing by Mid-America Apartment Communities. Westpost's website describes the residential community as offering studio and one-, two- and three-bedroom apartments and as being adjacent to Pentagon City Mall and the Metro.

as of May 2026, Arlington County was reviewing a minor site plan amendment request for the Pentagon Row/Westpost site. The application sought to remove a site-plan condition requiring a full-service grocery store of 40,000 to 70,000 sq ft (3,700 to 6,500 m^{2}) and a full-service drug store of 8,000 to 20,000 sq ft (740 to 1,860 m^{2}). The county project page stated that the applicant had tried to extend the lease for the existing Walgreens or locate another drug store tenant, but had been unable to do so.
