= CENVAT =

The introduction of CENVAT Credit Rules, 2004 served to be instrumental in codifying the credit mechanism into a single law for availing and utilisation of credit of taxes paid on goods as well as services for both the manufacturers and the service providers. An annual service tax cenvat return shall be required to be filed by specified tax payers.

== See also ==
- Drawback
