= Pentagon City =

Area of Arlington County, Virginia, US

Coordinates: 38°51′41″N 77°3′30″W

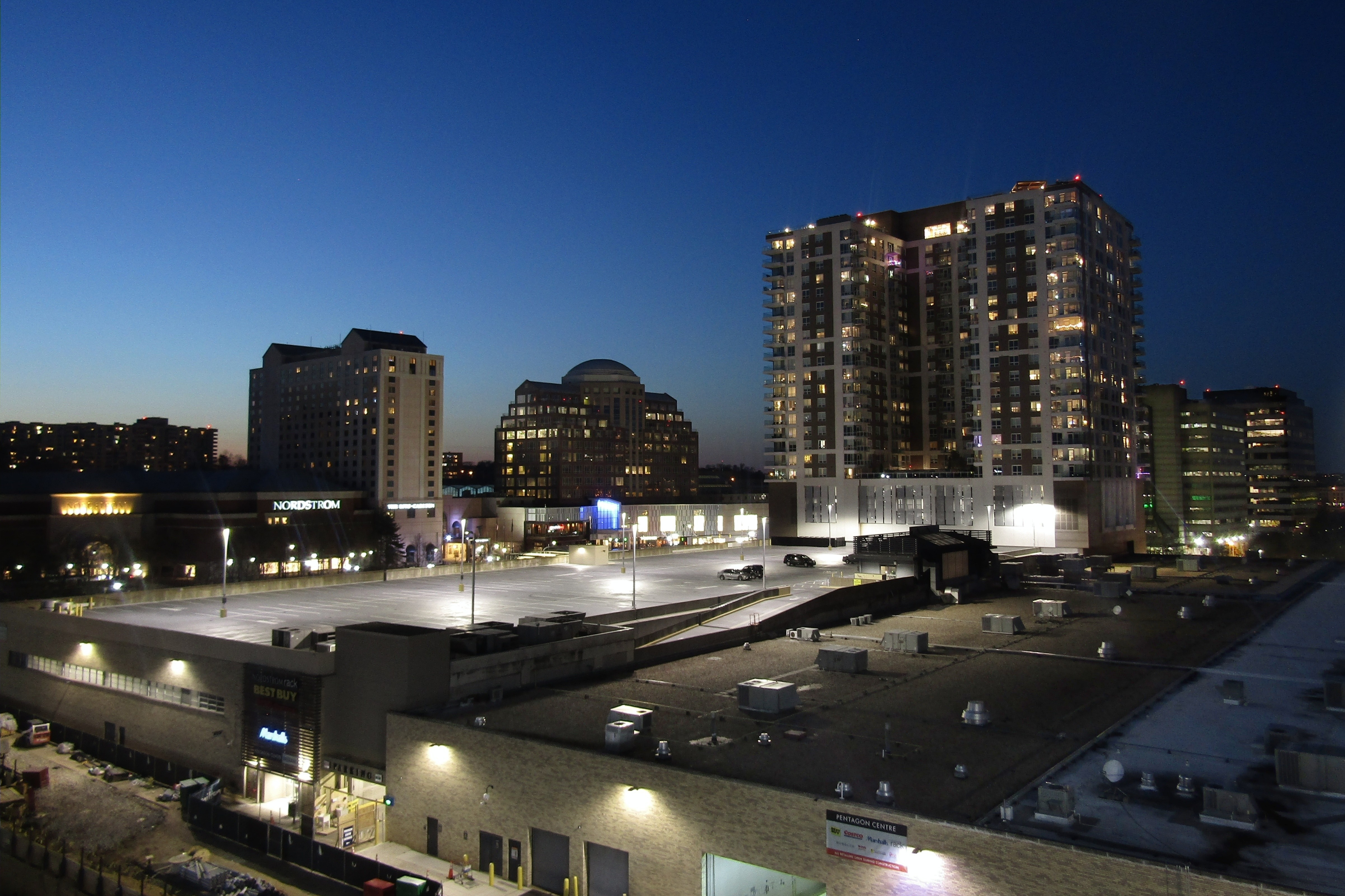
Pentagon City at night in March 2021

Pentagon City is an unincorporated neighborhood located in the southeast portion of Arlington County, Virginia. It is located near the Pentagon and Arlington National Cemetery.

== Location ==
Pentagon City is located less than a mile from the Potomac River, which separates the Commonwealth of Virginia from Washington, D.C. It is located on the Blue and Yellow Lines of the Washington Metro, and the Pentagon City Metro station is one of the busiest in the Metrorail system during both peak and off-peak hours. It's located two miles away from the National Mall in downtown Washington. The area is a popular site for hotels and businesses.

The Pentagon has parking lots on both sides of nearby Shirley Memorial Highway (I-395), on the north edge of Pentagon City. Crystal City lies east of Pentagon City along Richmond Highway (U.S. Route 1), between Pentagon City and Reagan National Airport. To the south is the neighborhood of Aurora Highlands and the Virginia Highlands Park. To the west is the neighborhood of Arlington Ridge. Washington Boulevard (State Route 27), Arlington Boulevard (U.S. Route 50), Columbia Pike (State Route 244), and State Route 110 are nearby major thoroughfares.

== History ==
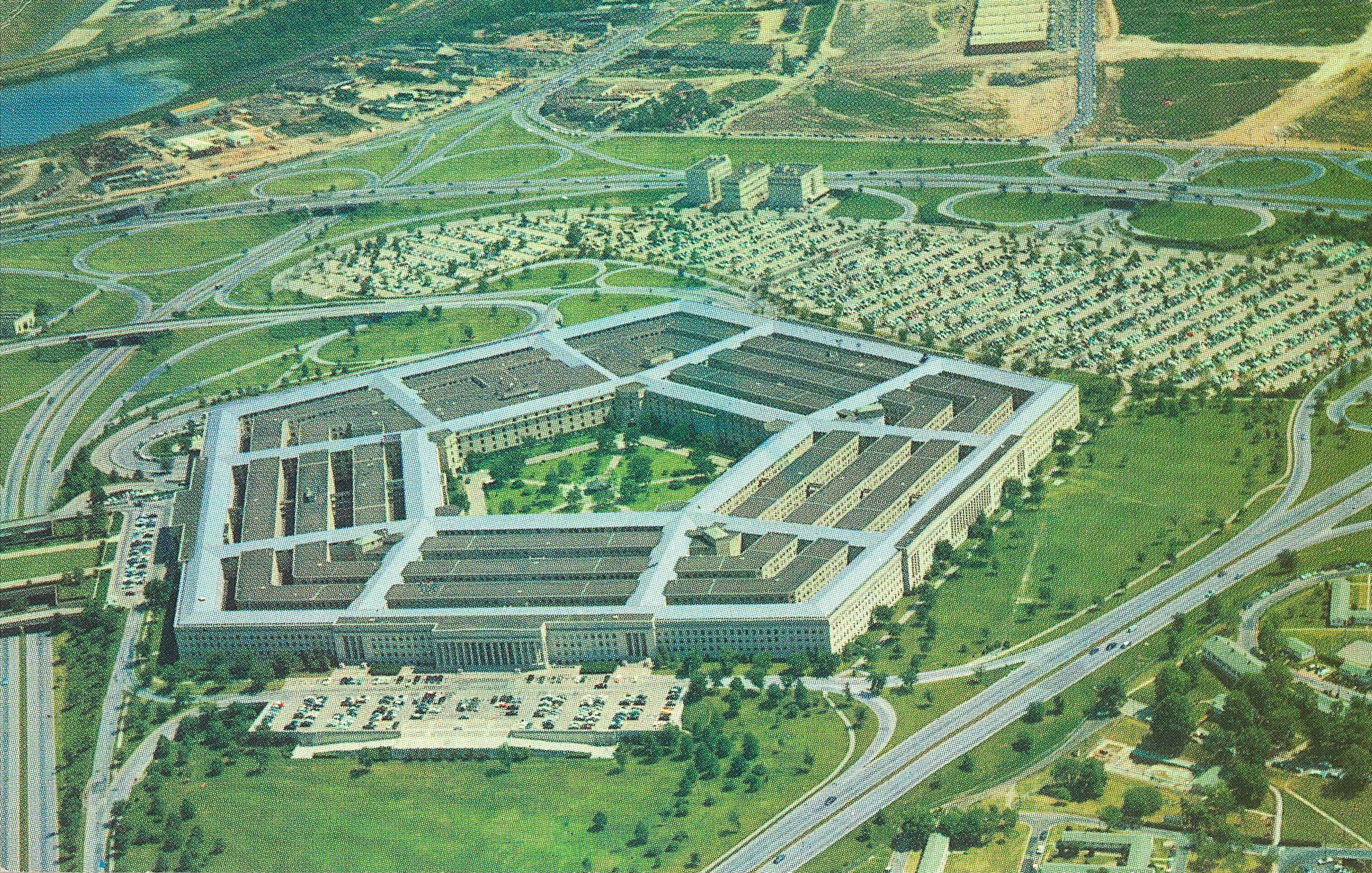
A 1950s postcard of The Pentagon with a still undeveloped Pentagon City in the top right

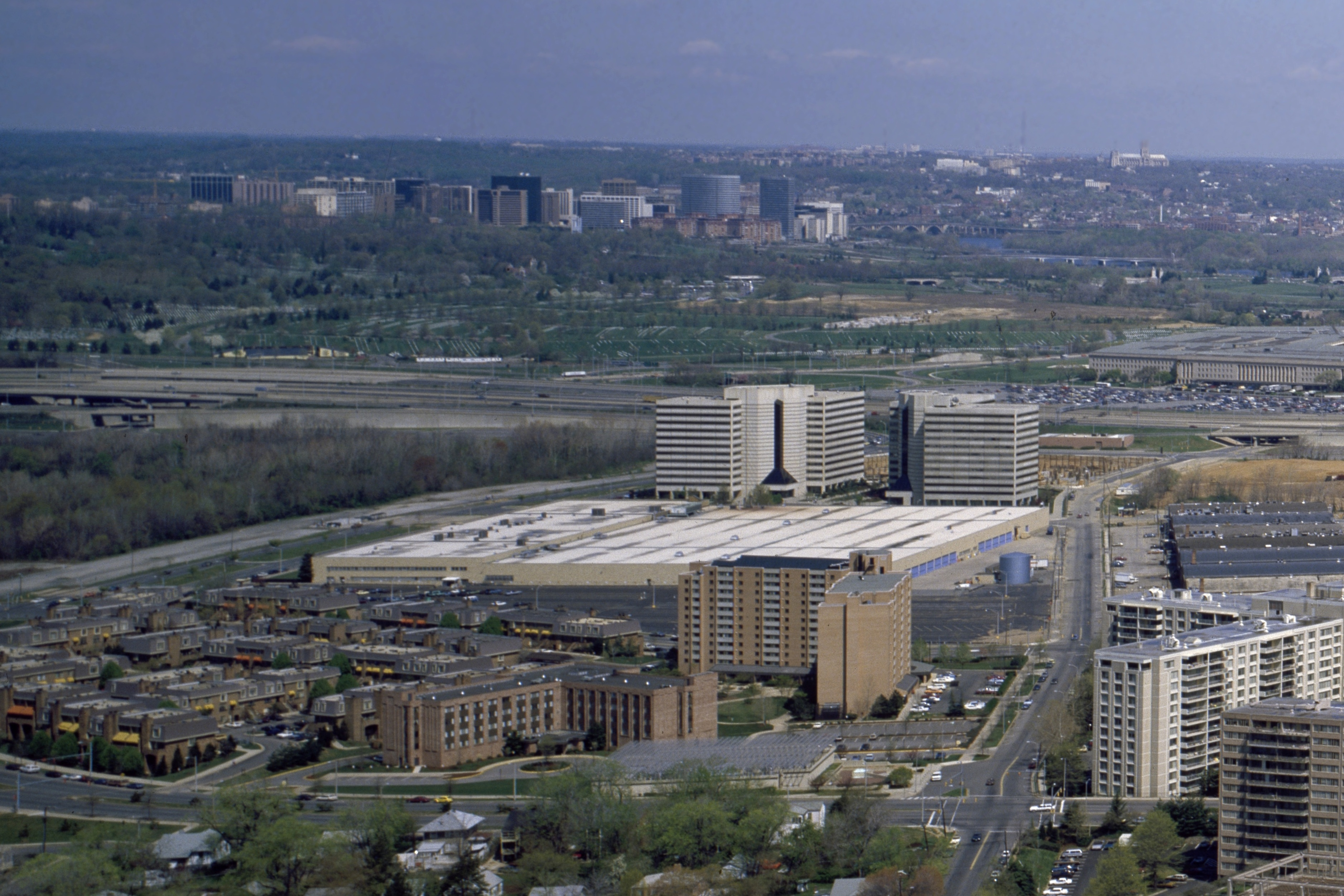
Pentagon City in the 1980s

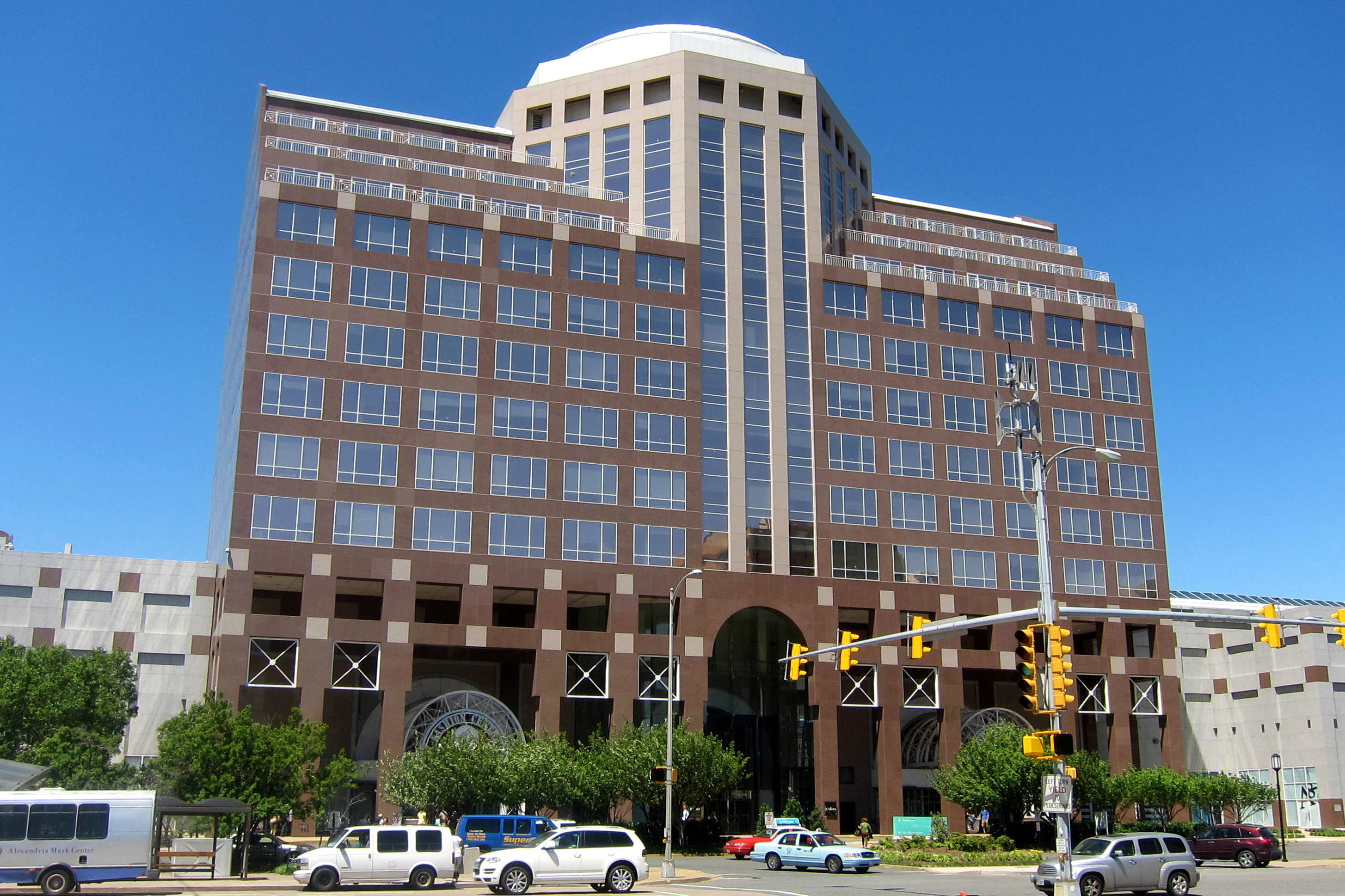
Washington Tower, designed by RTKL Associates, located above the Fashion Centre at Pentagon City

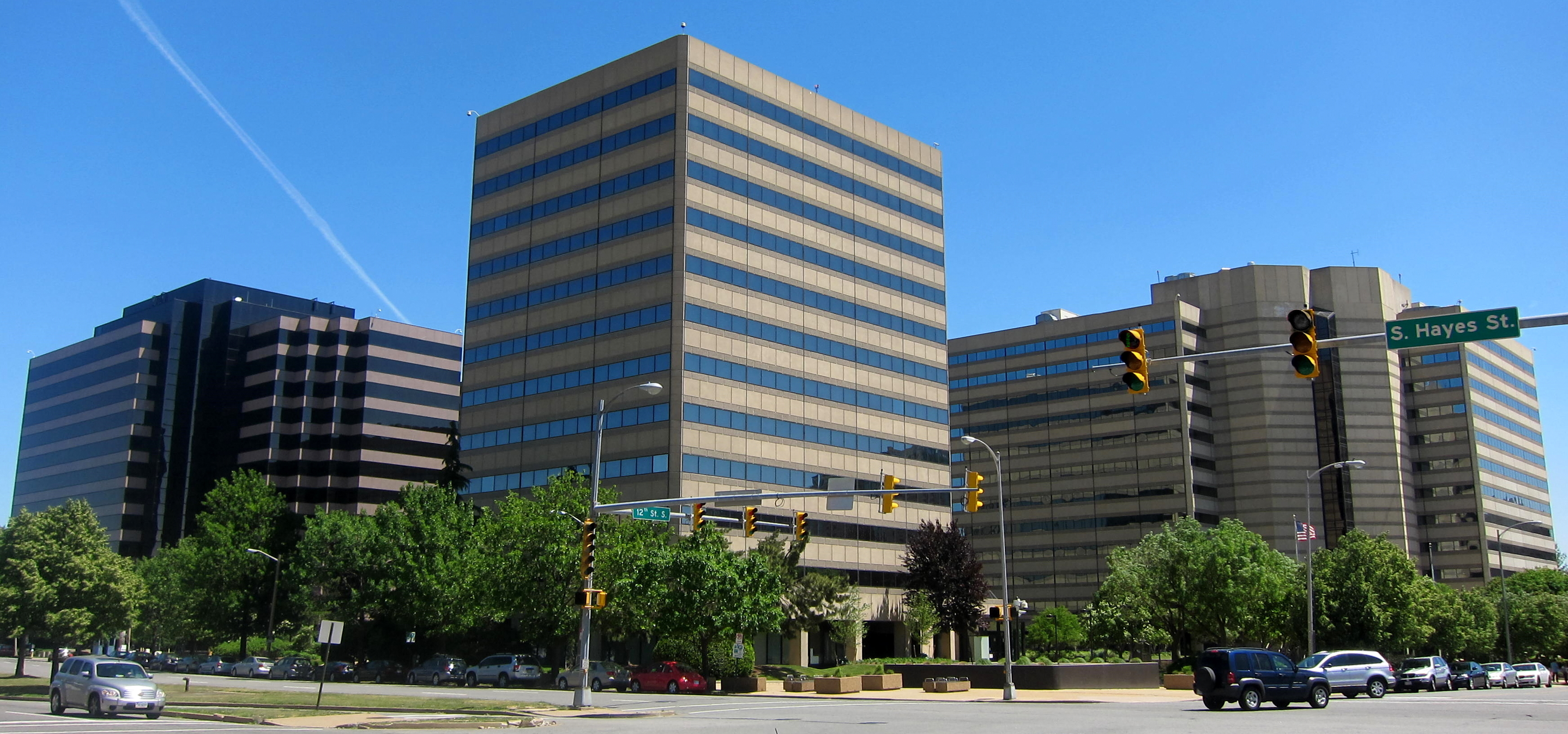
Pentagon City office buildings, including the Transportation Security Administration headquarters and Drug Enforcement Administration

=== Twentieth century ===
Pentagon City was founded in 1946, when developers Morris Cafritz and Charles H. Tompkins acquired a 190-acre site of empty fields and commercial warehouses for $1.5 million. A Western Electric telephone manufacturing facility opened in the 1950s and was later converted into a small shopping mall known as "Pentagon Centre." In the 1960s, high-rise apartment buildings were erected on Hayes, Fern, and Joyce Streets.

On July 1, 1977, the Pentagon City Metrorail station opened on the Blue Line. Although the new station bordered a large empty field, within ten years the station had stimulated high-density development.

In the 1990s, MCI Communications had a major presence in Pentagon City, with the company's Consumer Markets headquarters occupying Washington Tower, a twelve-story office building that sits atop the Fashion Centre at Pentagon City (a four-story indoor shopping mall that opened in 1989). MCI also occupied two of the four office towers immediately across South Hayes Street, known as Pentagon City I and II (often abbreviated "PCY").

=== Twenty-first century ===
In 2003, the Virginia Baseball Stadium Authority proposed five Northern Virginia sites as possible locations to host the relocating Montreal Expos. Pentagon Centre was one of three sites in Arlington County; the other two proposed Arlington sites were a plot of undeveloped land closer to the Pentagon and a site in Rosslyn. The issue was highly divisive and some Pentagon City residents launched a visible campaign against it. After the Arlington County Board opposed a stadium in Arlington, the final Virginia bid featured a site near Dulles Airport instead. Major League Baseball finally announced in fall of 2004 that the Expos would move to Washington, D.C. as the Washington Nationals.

== Commercial ==
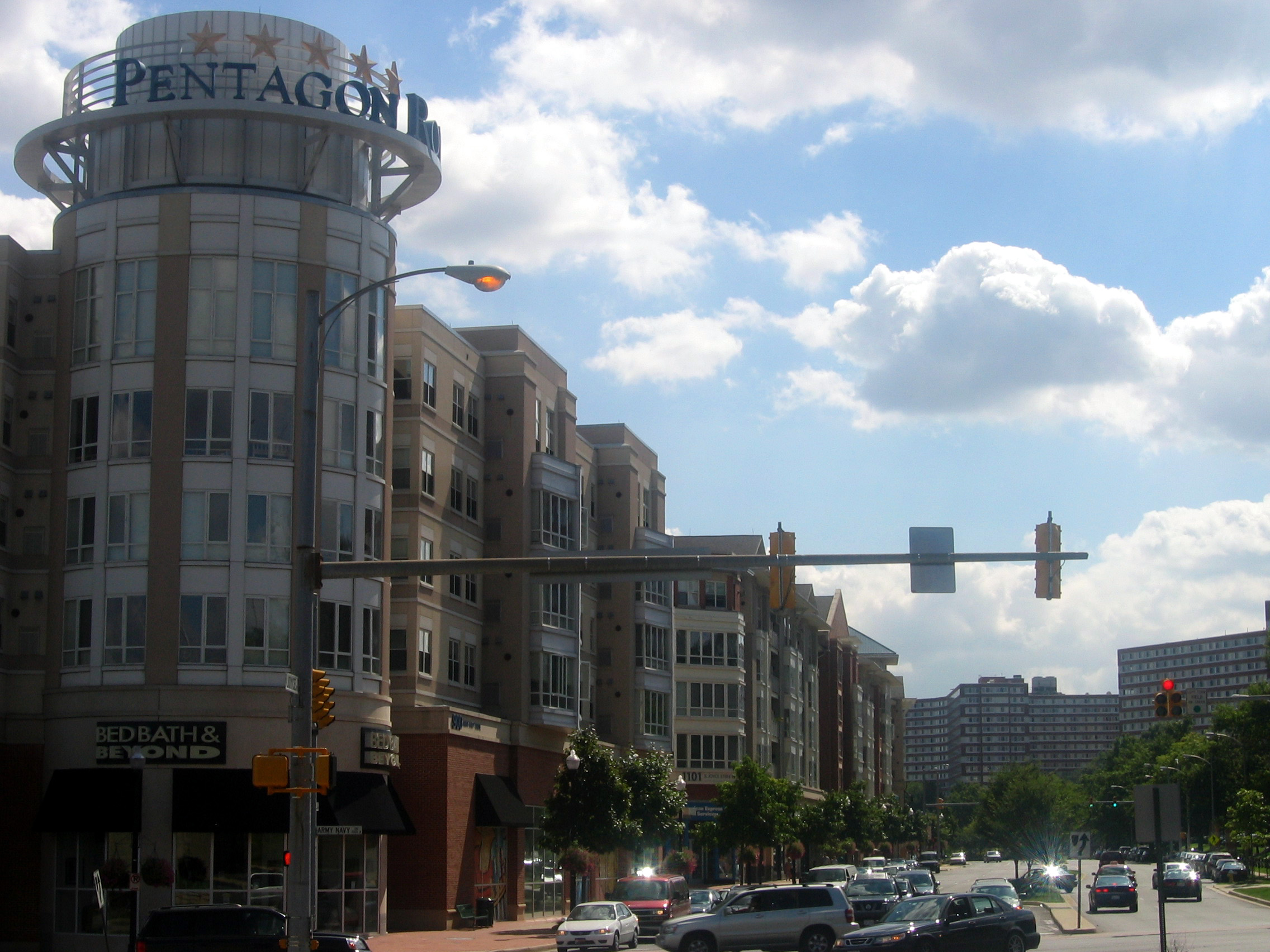
Pentagon Row shops

The area includes a multi-level indoor shopping mall, the Fashion Centre at Pentagon City, also known as the Pentagon City Mall. On the west side of the Fashion Centre is Pentagon Row, which includes a grocery store and smaller specialty stores and restaurants in the midst of high-end apartments. Pentagon Row features an outdoor ice rink during the winter and a free outdoor concert series on the plaza in the summer. A third shopping facility, Pentagon Centre, is located to the east of the Fashion Centre across Hayes Street.

Pentagon City also is home to the DEA, TSA, and other office buildings housing various federal government agencies and businesses. Given the proximity to the Pentagon, many are defense-related businesses. The Drug Enforcement Administration Museum and Visitors Center is located nearby on Army Navy Drive.

Amazon's east coast headquarters, dubbed the "HQ2" campus, is located in Pentagon City. Metropolitan Park and the WAS17 "Merlin" and WAS19 "Jasper" buildings are at the heart of it. The Amazon "Helix" building is planned for future development in Pentagon City.

== Residential ==
Within Pentagon City there are many high-rise luxury apartments and condos. Around the Fashion Centre Mall complex are several apartment buildings including The Metropolitan at Pentagon Row, Pentagon Row, and Park View. Across from the Pentagon City Mall and Costco is the four-story Southampton Condominium townhouse community. Also on that block are Claridge House, and Potomac Center Genesis Care; both residences for retired as well as disabled residents.

There is an open eight phase construction site next door to Costco on Fern Street, where the new Metropolitan Park development is being constructed. Kettler, real-estate development and property management company, razed warehouses that were a portion of an older industrial park for the project. The first phase of the project, completed in late 2007, consisted of the Gramercy at Metropolitan Park high-end rental apartments. Phase two of the project was completed in late 2009 and consists of The Millennium at Metropolitan Park, a second high-end rental apartment building. Both phases were architecturally planned by Robert A.M. Stern and include ground floor retail spaces suitable for any use. A two-and-a-half-acre park, with commissioned art, is also being constructed at the center of the project.

Virginia Highlands Park, located immediately south of the central retail area, provides a lush green space as well as basketball, tennis, soccer, and softball/baseball facilities. Adjacent to the park are the Aurora Hills branch of the Arlington Public Library system and a firehouse. The suburban neighborhood of Aurora Highlands, which consists primarily of single-family detached housing, extends due south of Pentagon City.
