= Läderach =

Swiss chocolate manufacturer

Läderach (Schweiz) AG
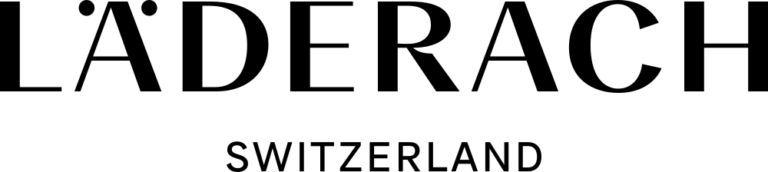
- Type: Aktiengesellschaft
- Industry: Confectionery
- Founded: 1962
- Founder: Rudolf Läderach
- Headquarters: Ennenda, Switzerland
- Number of locations: 220
- Key people: Johannes Läderach (CEO and President); Elias Läderach; David Läderach
- Products: Chocolate
- Revenue: CHF120 Million (2016)
- Number of employees: 2,000
- Subsidiaries: Confiseur Laederach Deutschland GmbH & Co KG; Merkur Confiserien AG
- Website: Official website

Läderach (brand presence: Läderach Switzerland) is a family run Swiss chocolate and confectionary manufacturer based in Ennenda (Glarus). It was founded in 1962 in Glarus by Rudolf Läderach (1929–2013). His patent for the process of manufacturing hollow, ready-made chocolate truffles revolutionized the fine chocolate industry. In 2004 Läderach decided to enter the consumer market by acquiring Merkur Confiserie AG, a well-established chocolate retailer. In 2012 the company was further vertically integrated towards end-consumers when it opened its first factory in Bilten in the Alps region. As of 2025 Läderach operates 220 stores.

== History ==
=== Foundation and leadership ===
The company was founded in 1962 by Rudolf Läderach, after his father Rudolf Läderach senior had run a bakery in Netstal (now the municipality of Glarus) since 1926. In 1970 Rudolf Läderach invented and patented his "process to manufacture thin-walled hollow balls for truffles", which simplified and improved the production of truffles. In 1981, Läderach expanded to Dillenburg, Germany and began exporting overseas for the first time.

In 1994, he handed over the operational management of the company to his second son Jürg Läderach, who served as CEO until 2018 and as chairman of the board of directors until the end of 2021. As of 2023 Jürg Läderach no longer owns any shares in the company, according to Swiss newspaper Tages-Anzeiger. In 2011, the third generation, Johannes and Elias Läderach, joined the company.

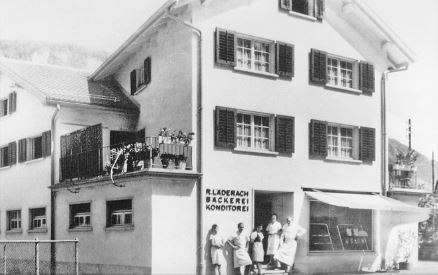
In 1962 Rudolf Läderach senior opened a small bakery, laying the foundation for today's company.

In 2018, the eldest son, Johannes Läderach, took over management of the company from his father Jürg as CEO and became chairman of the board of directors at the start of 2022. Elias Läderach, a trained confectioner and chocolatier, also joined the management team in 2018 and was named World Chocolate Master the same year. In addition, since the beginning of 2021, the third son David Läderach has been in charge of the company's German business.

=== Corporate growth ===
In 2004, Läderach acquired Olten-based Merkur Confiserie AG, a well-established chocolate and coffee retailer to sell its products directly to consumers. At the same time the company introduced its FrischSchoggi, a chocolate that customers can buy in a requested quantity from large slabs at the counters of the branches. In 2006, the company opened a logistics and service centre in Bilten. After a year of construction, Läderach opened its Minergie-certified production facility for chocolate mass in Bilten (municipality of Glarus North) in September 2012 with an annual production capacity of 1100 tons. By the end of 2014, Läderach had converted the 41 Merkur locations it had acquired into its own "Läderach Chocolateries".

In 2008, Läderach changed its brand identity to "Läderach - chocolatier suisse". At the beginning of 2024, the brand identity was changed to "Läderach Switzerland", according to Läderach due to the internationalisation of the company.

Production was expanded and modernised in Ennenda in 2017 to meet increasing demand. The 1981 established production plant with integrated shop in Dillenburg-Manderbach was closed on short notice in 2019; 134 employees lost their jobs. Due to the COVID-19 pandemic, Läderach closed several stores and experienced a drop in sales of up to 50 percent, leading to the dismissal of 27 employees in May 2020 without a social plan. Among those laid off were several long-standing employees, the oldest of whom was 63 years old.

In September 2022, Läderach was attacked by a hacker group with ransomware. The attack briefly affected the logistics, production and administration of the company. In October 2022, Läderach announced that a second chocolate factory would be opened in Bilten due to positive business developments. The factory, which consists of a production building and a high-bay warehouse, started production in August 2025 after a construction phase lasting almost two years.

=== International expansion ===
In 1981 Läderach opened its first foreign subsidiary, Confiseur Läderach GmbH & Co KG. In 2008, two new branches were opened on Bahnhofstrasse in Zurich and Spitalgasse in Bern, where show productions of various products took place. In the same year, a location was also opened in Freiburg, and the following year a store was opened in Karlsruhe. In 2009, Läderach began to expand into Asia and established a branch in South Korea, with additional locations opened in 2010 and 2011. The first consumer branches in the Americas opened in 2019: two branches in Toronto (Canada) and one branch in New York City (United States). In the same year, Läderach also opened its first branch in London (England). Läderach plans to open up to 35 stores in the United States.

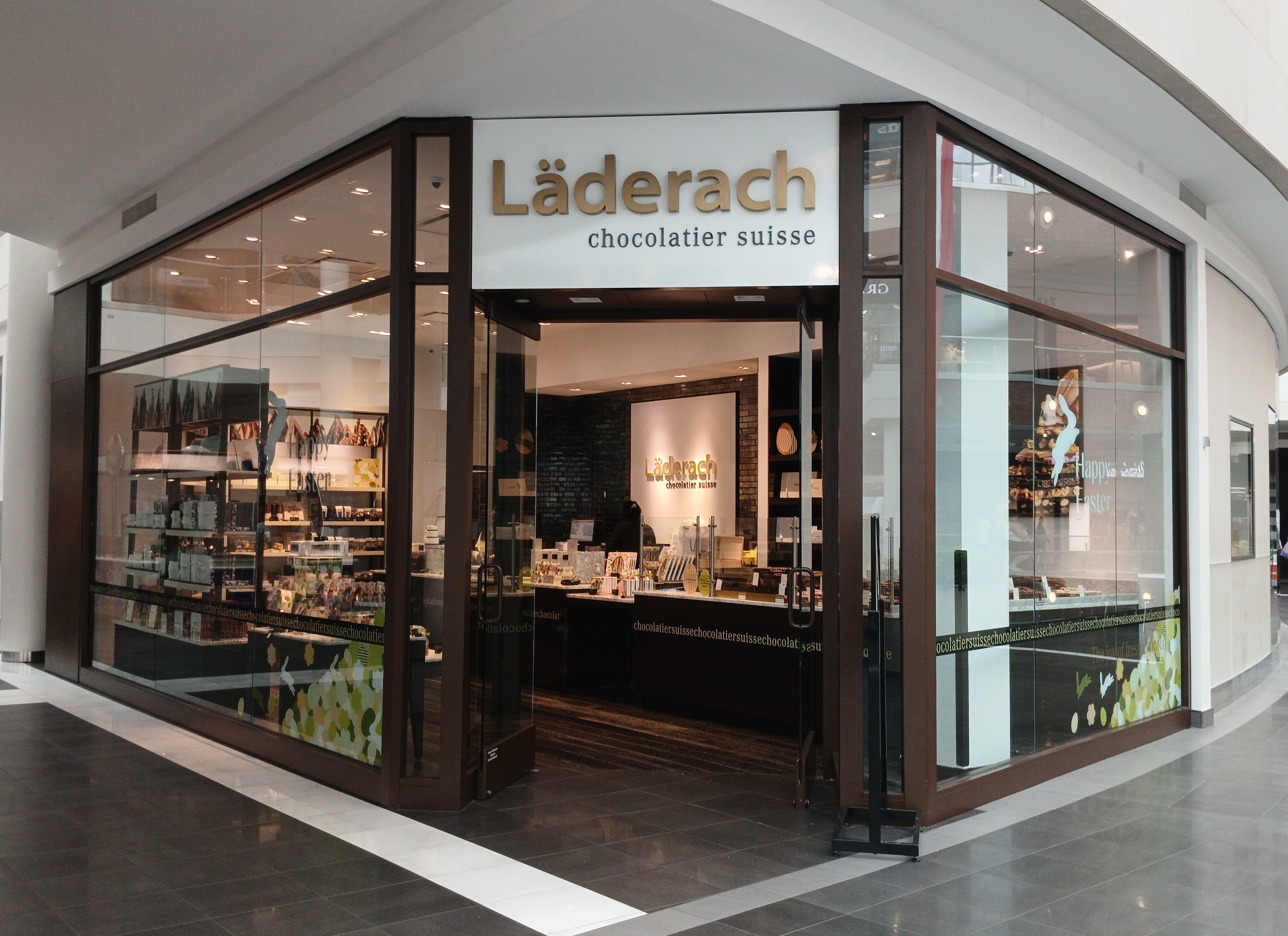
Läderach storefront at the Fashion Centre at Pentagon City, seen in April 2025

In November 2020, Läderach opened a visitor center and museum at the Bilten factory, called the "House of Läderach". In December 2020, Läderach opened its third store in the USA and its 100th store worldwide on 5th Avenue in New York. The company announced in February 2021 that it was opening 34 outlets in the United States, having taken over sites and retail space from Godiva Chocolatier. A Läderach branch opened in New Delhi in August 2023. In December 2023, the first French branch was opened in Paris, with a branch in Malaysia following shortly afterwards. In 2024, Läderach opened its 200th branch on High Street in Kensington, London.

== Corporate data ==
Since closing its site in Dillenburg, Läderach has been producing exclusively in Ennenda and at two sites in Bilten in the canton of Glarus in Switzerland. In March 2022, according to a statement from Johannes Läderach's published in the Tages-Anzeiger, Läderach employed people from 50 nations and 60 percent women in management positions.

In 2015, 750 employees worked for Läderach. By 2021, the number grew to 1,000 and reached 1,300 by 2022. In 2024, Läderach employs around 2,000 people from over 65 countries across 20 countries. The products are sold in 220 of the company's own boutiques, 100 of which are located in Europe.

== Products ==
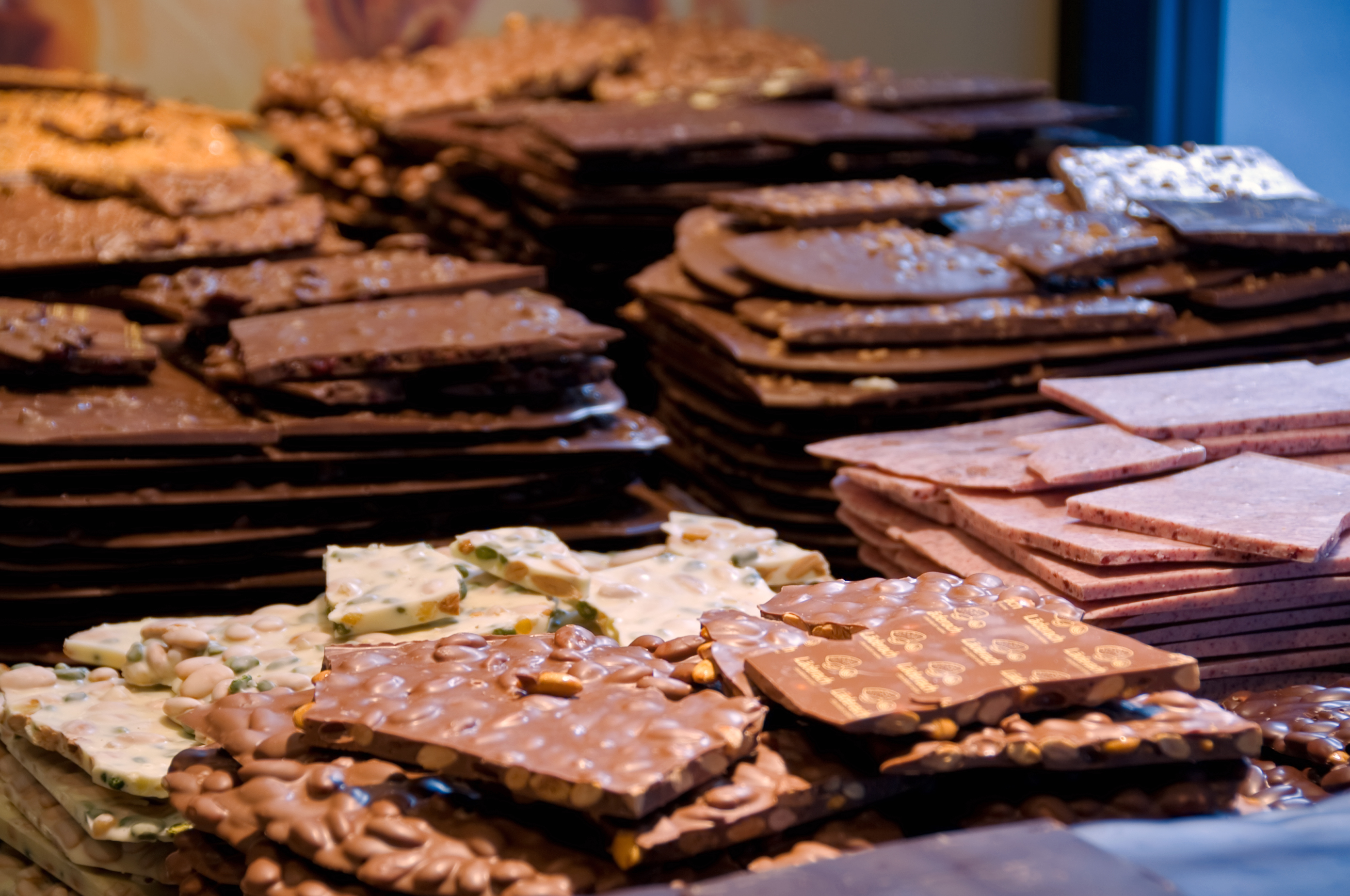
Chocolate barks, Läderach's best known product.

Läderach mainly produces chocolate bars, pralines and confectionery; the best-selling products include hazelnut milk and dark almond chocolate. There are also various chocolate snacks, seasonal and gift items. Since 2022, the company has also offered a vegan chocolate line featuring four products based on cashew-based milk.

According to Läderach, the company controls the entire production process of its chocolate, whose cocoa beans come from cooperation with farmers in Madagascar, Costa Rica, Trinidad, Ghana, Brazil and Ecuador.

== Social stances ==
Jürg Läderach and his son Johannes were active in the association Christianity for Today (CFT), which was dissolved in 2022. Further, management staff of Läderach company were high-ranking members of CFT. CFT took a conservative position on certain social issues, such as rejection of same-sex partnerships and opposition to abortion.

In addition, Jürg and Johannes Läderach were co-organizers of the "March for Life", an annual gathering to promote pro-life views. Jürg Läderach has fought against laws advancing same-sex marriage and pornography for years. In January 2020, Swiss and German LGBT groups call for a boycott of the Läderach Products. Swiss International Air Lines ended their collaboration with Läderach in November 2019. Johannes Läderach publicly distanced himself from so-called homophobic statements, stating that he would never want to hurt or discriminate against people because of their sexual orientation.

== Awards ==
- 2012: SVC Entrepreneur Award Eastern Switzerland
- 2018: World Chocolate Master (Elias Läderach)
- 2023: Best Managed Company 2023 in Switzerland (award by Deloitte, the Julius Bär bank and the Swiss Stock Exchange SIX)

== See also ==
- Swiss chocolate
- List of bean-to-bar chocolate manufacturers
