= Fashion Centre at Pentagon City =

Shopping mall in Arlington County, Virginia, U.S.

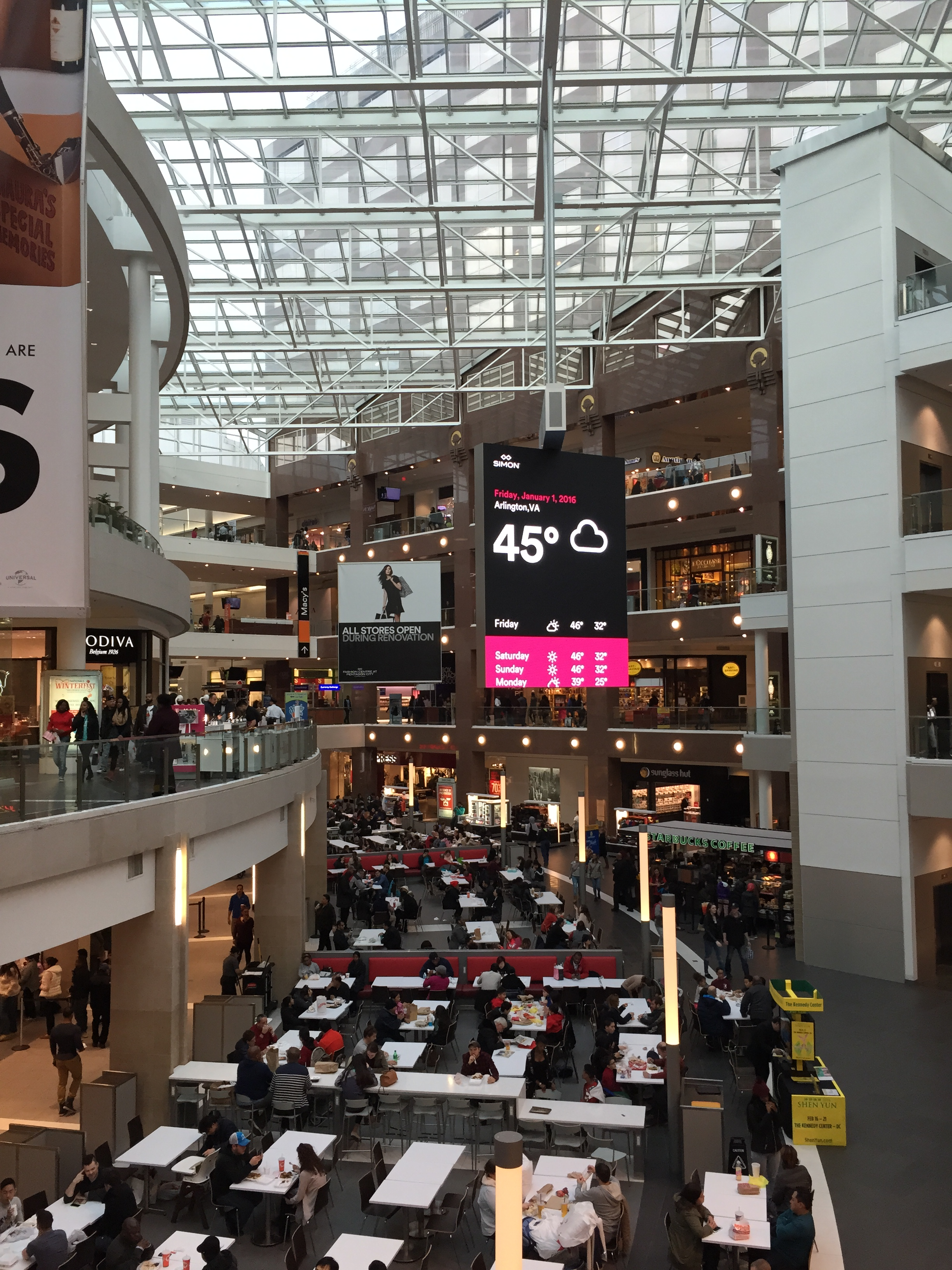
- Main court in January 2016, during the mall's renovation
- Location: Arlington, Virginia, United States
- Coordinates: 38°51′47.6″N 77°3′38.6″W
- Opened: October 5, 1989; 37 years ago
- Developer: Melvin Simon & Associates; Rose Associates
- Manager: Simon Property Group
- Owner: Simon Property Group (42.5%)
- Num. of stores: 140+
- Num. of anchor tenants: 2
- Floor area: 927,462 sq ft (86,164.0 m^{2})
- Floors: 4 (3 in anchors)
- Public transit: Washington Metro: at Pentagon City; Metrobus: A11, A1X, A27, A40, A66, F44; Arlington Transit: 42, 74, 84, 87
- Website: www.simon.com/mall/fashion-centre-at-pentagon-city

Fashion Centre at Pentagon City, informally the Pentagon City Mall, is an enclosed regional shopping mall in the Pentagon City neighborhood of Arlington, Virginia, near Interstate 395 and South Hayes Street. It is next to Westpost at National Landing and across the street from Pentagon Centre. Its Metro level is directly connected to the Pentagon City station on the Blue and Yellow Lines of the Washington Metro.

The mall has more than 140 specialty stores and restaurants. Its major retailers and uses include Macy's, Nordstrom, and the Ritz-Carlton Pentagon City hotel. The Washington Tower office building, formerly leased by MCI, is part of the mall property; its lower levels are part of the mall.

== History ==
The mall was developed by Melvin Simon & Associates with real-estate investment firm Rose Associates as part of the 1976 Pentagon City Phased-Development Site Plan. It opened in fall 1989 with 860,000 sq ft of space on 25 acres, with Macy's and Nordstrom as anchor stores. Original plans called for Bamberger's as one of the anchor stores. The mall also opened with approximately 150 other stores and a 4,524-capacity parking garage. The office tower part of the complex opened a little later, and the 345-room hotel opened the following year. The interior featured a white color scheme and skylit atria extending in two wings from the central courtyard.

The mall theater, Loews Pentagon City 6, closed on January 1, 2003, and was replaced by a clothing store.

Expansion of the mall, including outward-facing stores on Hayes Street, was approved by the county board in 2013. At the time, the mall had more than 170 stores. The project was completed in 2016.

== Awards ==
The center was a finalist for the 2018 International Council of Shopping Centers U.S. Design & Development and Retailer Awards.

== Ownership ==
In late 1990, Melvin Simon & Associates sold 50% of its interest in the mall to Lehndorff Group, a real estate management firm. During 1991, it sold another 25% to other institutional investors, retaining a quarter interest and management of the center. Simon Property Group, the successor to the Simon shopping mall interests, subsequently raised its stake; as of April 2014, it jointly owned the mall with Institutional Mall Investors, a joint venture of Miller Capital Advisory and CalPERS. as of 31 December 2025, Simon's Form 10-K listed a 42.5% ownership interest in the property. The Ritz-Carlton hotel is separately owned, by Xenia Hotels & Resorts.

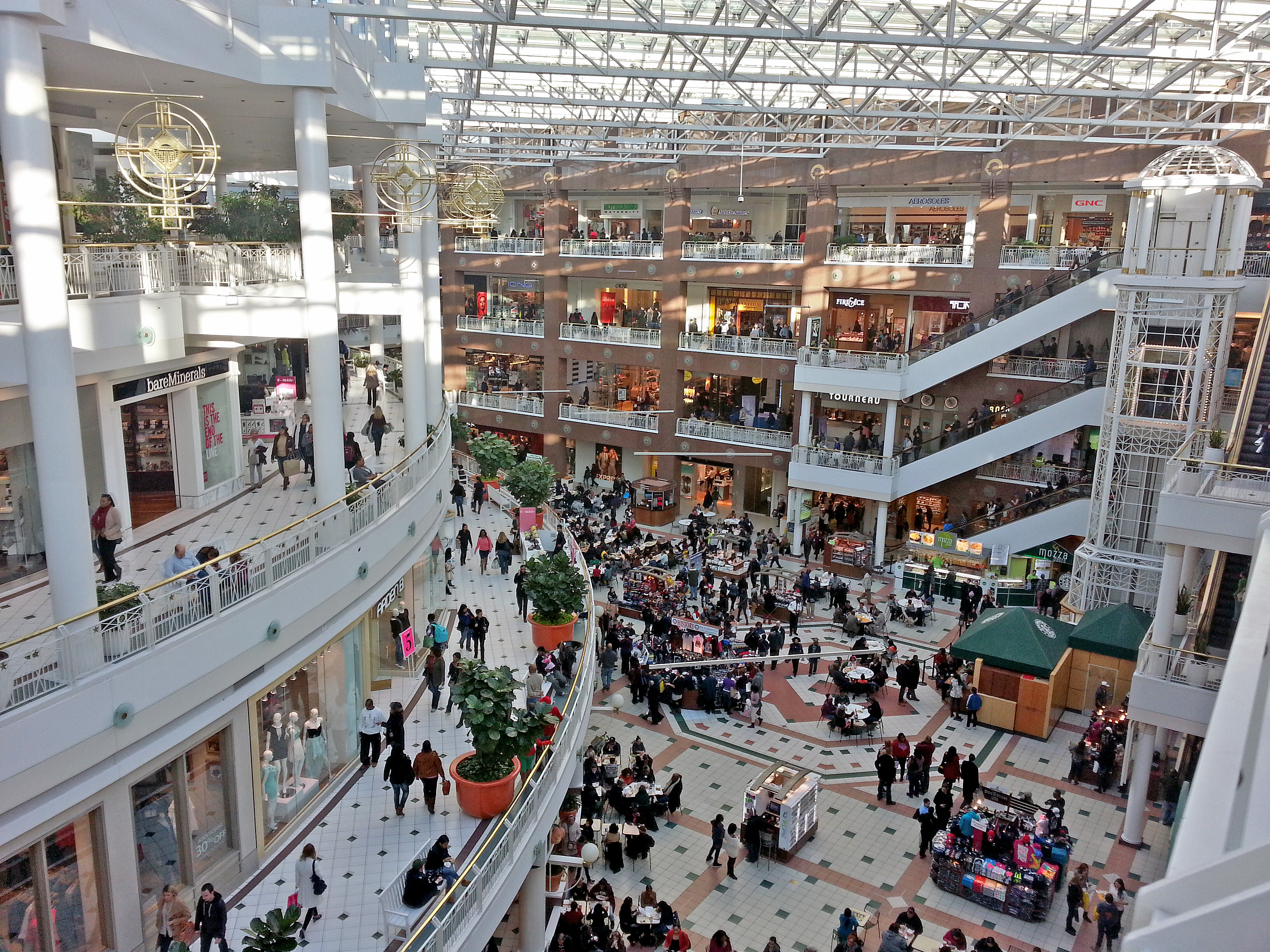
Interior seen from the 4th floor, January 2013

Interior in 1990
