= Fort Reynolds =

Fort Reynolds can refer to the following:

- Fort Reynolds (California) or Camp Reynolds on Angel Island, California, USA
- Fort Reynolds (Colorado) near Avondale, Colorado, USA
- Fort Reynolds (Virginia) in Arlington County, Virginia, USA
