= Jelleff's =

American retail store

- Industry: Retail
- Founded: 1910
- Defunct: 1979
- Fate: Liquidation
- Headquarters: Washington, D.C., U.S.
- Products: Women's apparel, shoes, accessories, and cosmetics.

The Frank R. Jelleff Co., or more commonly Jelleff's was a Washington, D.C.–based retailer that specialized in women's apparel.

== History ==
Jelleff's was founded March 1910, on F Street, N.W. in downtown Washington, D.C. Its founder, Frank R. Jelleff, founded the first Boy's Club in the Washington metropolitan area. area, and the club at 3265 S Street NW, just off Wisconsin Ave., is named in his honor. The company was family run until 1968, when a group headed by I. Lee Potter purchased the store from the founder's widow. Potter served as chairman until the company's closing in 1979. His father, Alan Potter, served as president.

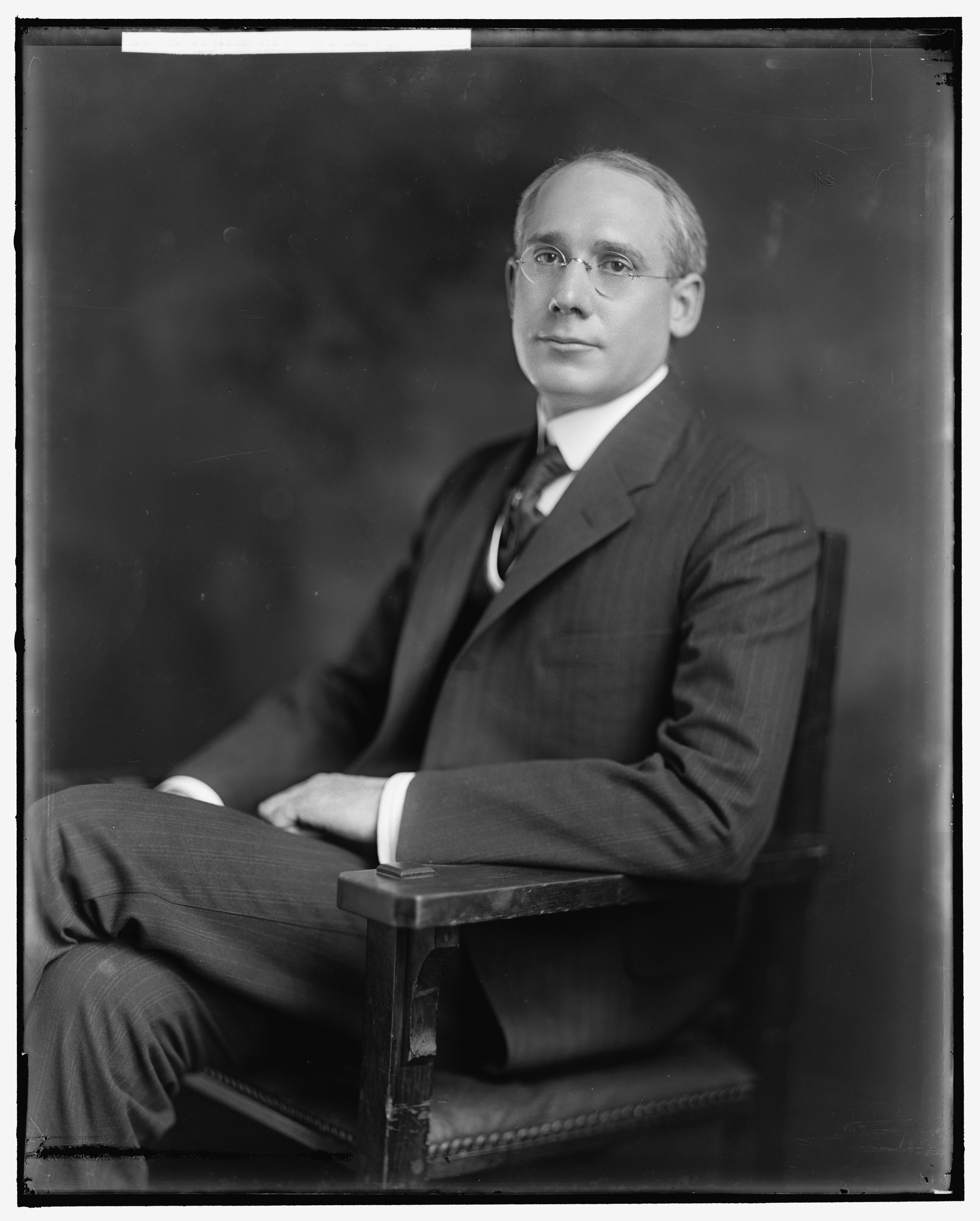
Founder Frank Jelleff

== Flagship store ==
The flagship store was located at 1214–1220 F Street, NW, in the "F Street Mall." The store closed in early 1973.

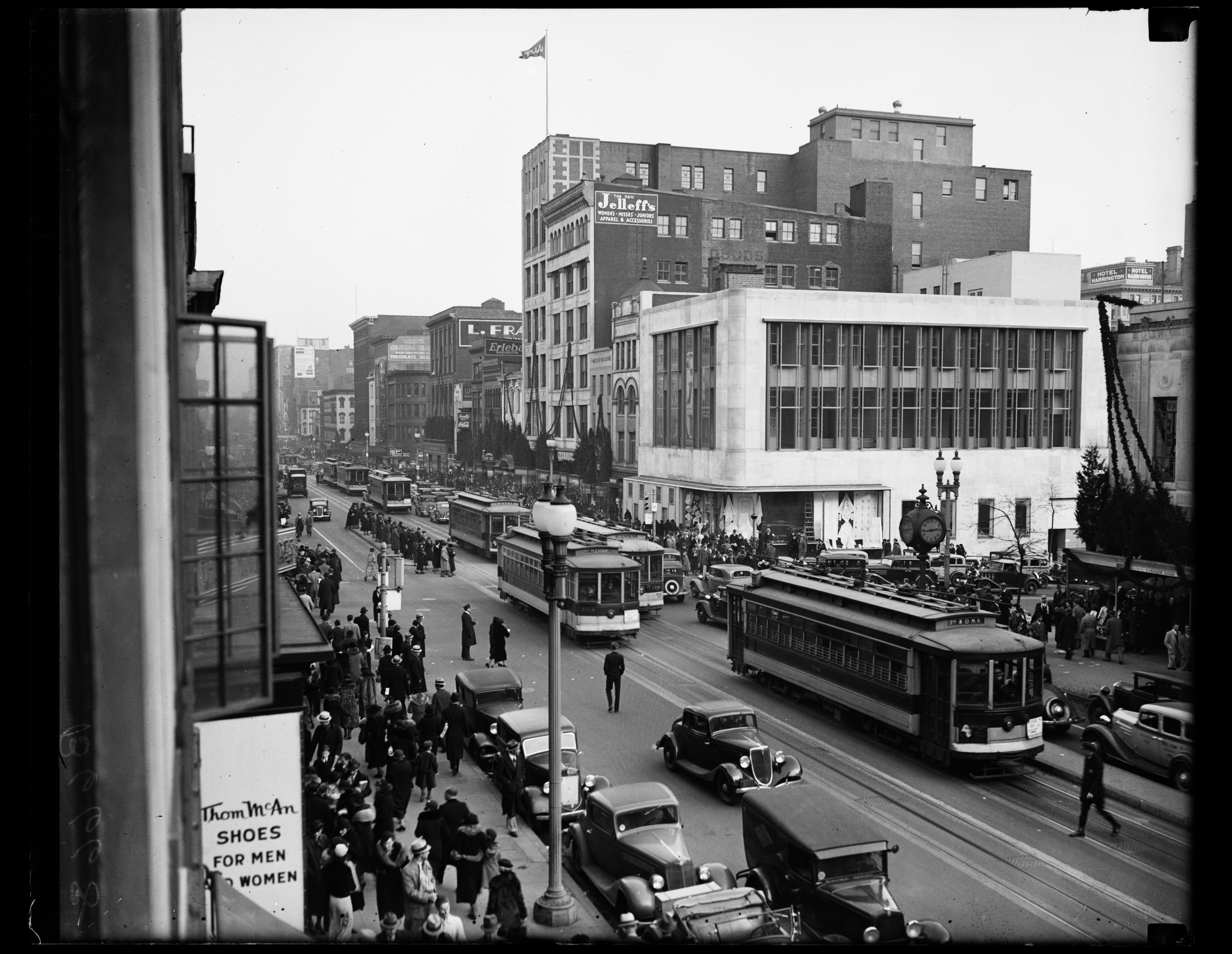

== Branch stores ==
Jelleff's opened its first suburban location at the Shirlington Shopping Center in nearby suburban Virginia in December 1947, which closed November 1, 1972, but the 20,000-square-foot (1,900 m^{2}) store reopened in 1973, as a discount general department store.

Jelleff's also operated locations in Silver Spring, in Falls Church, the Springfield Mall, a 40,000-square-foot (3,700 m^{2}) store at Tysons Corner Center, and at 4472 Connecticut Avenue, NW, in Washington, D.C. It operated a 3,800-square-foot (350 m^{2}) store, known as the "Little Shop," from 1942 to 1969, at 6936 Wisconsin Avenue., in Bethesda, Maryland.

A 12,000-square-foot (1,100 m^{2}) store opened in the then-new Crystal City Underground in Crystal City, Virginia, in September 1976, In 1979, at the time of the chain's closing, it continued to operate independently as "Fifteen Thirty Five." The Tysons Corner store closed in early 1979, followed in May by the Connecticut Avenue and Springfield Mall locations, then in June by Silver Spring.
