= Julius Peter Garesché =

Union Army officer

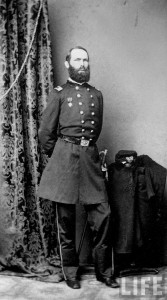
- Lieutenant Colonel Julius Peter Garesché
- Born: April 26, 1821; Havana, La Habana, Cuba
- Died: December 31, 1862 (aged 41); Stones River, Tennessee, U.S.
- Burial place: Mount Olivet Cemetery; Washington, D.C., U.S.
- Military career
- Allegiance: United States
- Branch: United States Army; Union Army
- Service years: 1841–1862
- Rank: Lieutenant Colonel
- Commands: Chief of Staff, Army of the Cumberland
- Conflicts: Mexican–American War; American Civil War: Battle of Stones River †

Julius Peter Garesché (April 26, 1821 – December 31, 1862), birth name "Julio Pedro Garesché de Rocher", was an American professional soldier. He was killed at the Battle of Stones River, Tennessee during the American Civil War. The Union Army's Battery Garesché was named for him.

== Early life ==
Garesché was born near Havana, Cuba. He was sent to Georgetown College, Washington, in 1833, and remained there four years. There he was appointed to the United States Military Academy at West Point. He entered West Point on July 1, 1837 and graduated with the class of 1841, receiving his commission as a second lieutenant in the 4th U.S. Artillery on July 1, 1841.

== Early career ==
The five subsequent years were spent on the frontier and in garrison duty. His first assignment was to Madison Barracks in Sackett's Harbor, New York from 1841 to 1842. He was briefly reassigned to Fort Monroe in Virginia and then to Fort McHenry in Maryland from 1842 to 1844. He served at Carlisle Barracks in Pennsylvania in 1844 before returning to Fort McHenry the next year. He was briefly assigned to recruiting duty in 1846. He was promoted to 1st lieutenant in the 4th Artillery on June 14, 1846.

During the Mexican–American War he served with distinction at Camargo, Mexico and as Acting Assistant Adjutant-General of Rio Grande District from 1847 to 1848.

He served in Texas from 1849 to 1851. He was reassigned as on staff duty in the Adjutant-General's Office, Washington, D.C., from 1852 to 1853. He then served on recruiting service and engineer duty in the Department of Texas in 1853. He then served on frontier duty at Fort Brown, Texas, 1853 to 1854, Las Animas, N. M., 1854, and Fort Brown, Texas, 1854 to 1855.

He was breveted as a staff captain, and assistant adjutant general on November 9, 1855 and served in Washington, D.C. until November 5, 1862.

== Religious work ==
A Catholic, in Newark he organized the first local conference of the St. Vincent de Paul Society, and during his residence at the capital acted as its president. He contributed frequently on Catholic, social and political questions, to the New York "Freeman's Journal" and "Brownson's Quarterly Review", and in September, 1851, in recognition of his services to the Church, received from Pope Pius IX the decoration of a Knight of St. Sylvester.

== Civil War ==
When the American Civil War broke out in 1861, Garesché declined a commission as brigadier general of volunteers. He was, however, breveted as a staff major on May 14, 1861 and was given the permanent rank of major on August 3, 1861.

He was promoted to the rank of lieutenant colonel and assistant adjutant general on July 17, 1862 and was made chief of staff to Major General William S. Rosecrans.

Rosecrans's biographer (WM Lamers, The Edge of Glory, LSU Press, pbk Ed, 1999, p. 193) says of Garesché: "He seemed without earthly ambition, half mystic, half saint; he denied himself reasonable comforts to help the poor...the Confederates considered him the 'most gallant gentleman in the army.'"

In this capacity, he participated in the operations of the Army of the Cumberland at the Battle of Stones River on December 31, 1862. Riding with General Rosecrans toward the Round Forest, Garesché was decapitated by a cannonball. The battle was his first combat during the Civil War. General William B. Hazen soon afterward happened upon the lifeless body and removed Garesché's West Point ring and personal Bible.

Colonel Garesché was interred at Mount Olivet Cemetery in Washington, D.C.

== See also ==
- Hispanics in the American Civil War
