= The Village at Shirlington =

- Location: Shirlington, Arlington, Virginia
- Coordinates: 38°50′27″N 77°5′16″W
- Opened: 1944
- Owner: Federal Realty Investment Trust
- Website: The Village at Shirlington

The Village at Shirlington opened as Shirlington Shopping Center in 1944, and was the first large shopping center to open in the Washington, D.C. suburbs and one of the earliest in the United States. It is located along Campbell Avenue (formerly South 28th Street) at the intersection of Shirley Highway and Quaker Lane / Shirlington Road in Arlington, Virginia. The center has been known since the mid-1980s as The Village at Shirlington.

== History ==
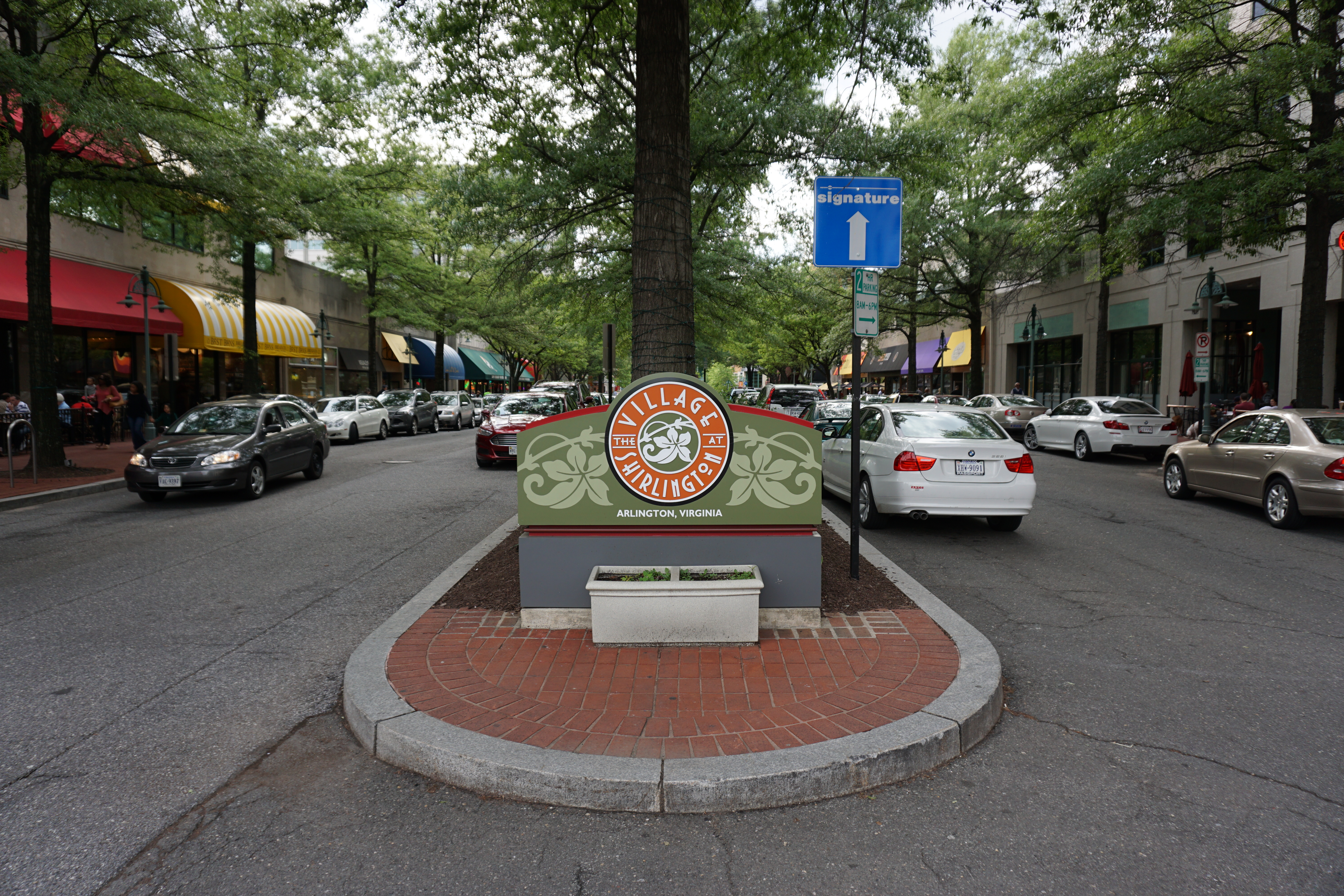
Entrance to The Village at Shirlington

The center was originally developed by Joseph Cherner, automobile dealer and banker, on a 23 1/2-acre site to provide for the basic shopping needs of the nearby sprawling Parkfairfax, developed by the Metropolitan Life Insurance Company, and the Defense Homes Corporation development at Fairlington. He established the Shirlington Corporation in August 1943, and the first store opened in June 1944. The center expanded gradually, with an increasing variety of retail offerings. In 1947, the local women's clothing chain Jelleff's chain opened a 7,000-square-foot (650 m^{2}) store; its fourth branch and first suburban location. It was also known as Shirlington Business Center. By the time of its fifth anniversary, there were 48 stores operating in the shopping center. In addition to Jelleff's, there was an Acme supermarket, F.W. Woolworth, Singer Sewing Center, Fanny Farmer candy, Firestone as well as standard local offerings, such as a Shirley Food Store. In 1951, the center expanded with 25 additional stores.

On September 14, 1959, the Lansburgh's department store opened its second suburban branch location at Shirlington. The 150,000-square-foot (14,000 m^{2}) store cost $2.5 million to construct. It would be the center's only anchor department store. It closed in May 1973, and reopened as a Best Products store.

The center declined during the 1970s because of the economic slump and growing competition from close by modern shopping malls, including Springfield Mall. In 1982, the Oliver T. Carr Co. unveiled a $250 million plan to redevelop the then 425,000-square-foot (39,500 m^{2}) shopping center. Since then, the center has been expanded and renamed The Village at Shirlington. It is now owned and managed by Federal Realty Investment Trust, which purchased it in 1995.

In 2005, after years of planning between Federal Realty Investment Trust and Arlington County, construction began on an expansion of The Village at Shirlington, which added 650 apartment and condominium units, doubled the length of the main street, more retail space including a Harris Teeter grocery store, a branch library, and a new home for the Signature Theatre. The goal is "to increase the number of people in Shirlington to create a round-the-clock environment there."

As of 2012, The Village at Shirlington has a wide variety of eating options. Restaurants include: Aladdin's Eatery, Bonsai Grill, Capitol City Brewing Company, Robeks, The Bungalow, Aroma Indian Restaurant, Busboys & Poets, Caribou Coffee, Guapo's Restaurant, Luna Grill & Diner, Yogi Berry, Carlyle Grand Cafe, Subway, Best Buns Bread Company, Cakelove, Cheestique, Johnny Rockets, PING by Charlie Chiang's, and T.H.A.I in Shirlington.

As of 2019, some restaurants have closed and the village has added new ones. The new restaurants include Copperwood Tavern, Palette 22, Dudley's Sports Bar and Grill, Dam Good Burger Moby Dick and Cafe Pizzaiolo. The village also added nail salons, hair salons and an ice cream shop. Capital City Brewing Company has shut down rumored by bankruptcy. Ping by Charlie has permanently shut down, Cakelove also has permanently shut down and Bungalow, Luna Grill & Diner and Aladdin's Eatery and Johnny Rockets have shut down.

The village is also the home to an enormous flock of winter-roosting crows which have complicate the lives of residents and restaurants since 2017. Federal Realty Investment Trust attempted a fog deterrent in March 2022.
