= Battery Garesche =

Union Army artillery battery

- Arlington, Virginia
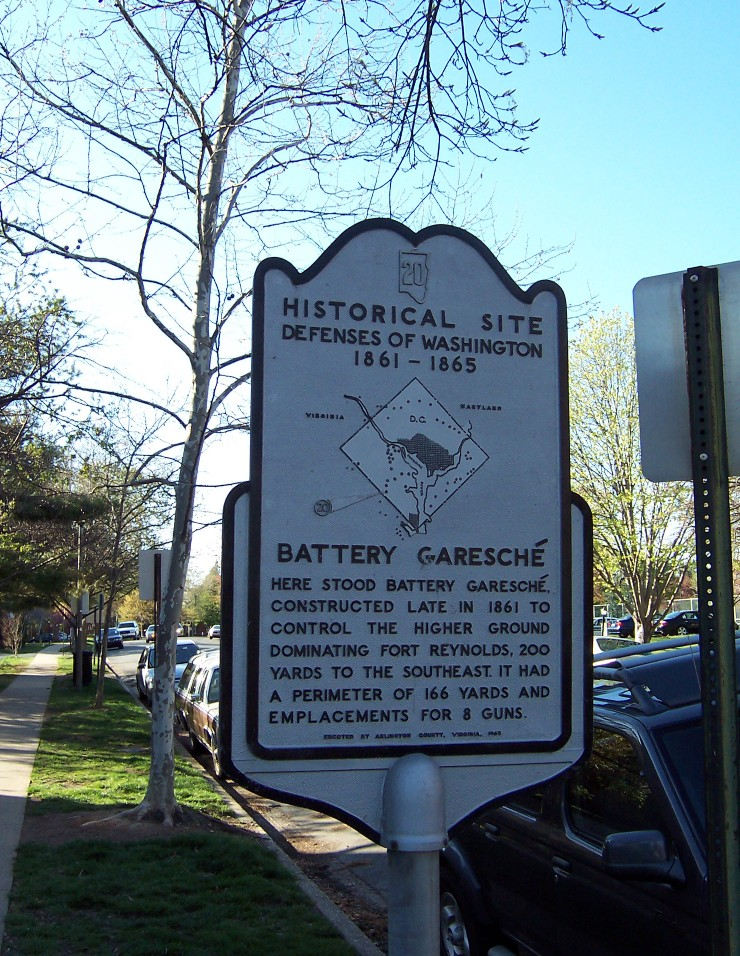
- Battery Garesche historical marker

Location
- Location within the Washington, D.C., area
- Coordinates: 38.838517°N 77.09725°W

Site history
- Built: 1861

Battery Garesche or Battery Garesché was a Union Army artillery battery built as part of the defenses of Washington, D.C. in the American Civil War at what is now Abingdon Street at South 30th Road in Fairlington, Arlington County, Virginia.

The battery was named after Lieutenant Colonel Julius P. Garesché who was killed on 31 December 1862 at the Battle of Stones River in Tennessee.

== History ==
It was constructed in late 1861 to control the high ground over Fort Reynolds, 200 yards (180 m) to the southeast, and to protect it from Confederate attack from positions on Seminary Ridge. It had a perimeter of 166 yards (152 m) and emplacements for 9 guns.

Although located in Virginia, a Confederate state, this was part of the area near Washington that was never controlled by Confederate forces. The battery no longer exists and is now noted only with a historical marker.

Another Battery Garesché commemorated the deceased lieutenant colonel much later at Fort Williams, in Cape Elizabeth, Maine. It was a concrete shore battery which contained two disappearing 6-inch (155 mm) guns. Built in 1906, its armed existence was brief, as its guns were removed for use on the Western Front in World War I.
