= Henry G. Shirley Memorial Highway =

Coordinates: 38.77773°N 77.17976°W

Henry G. Shirley Memorial Highway
- Shirley Highway
- Shirley Highway highlighted in red

Route information
- Length: 17.3 mi (27.8 km)
- History: Constructed and opened from 1941 to 1952
- Component highways: I-95 from Colchester to Springfield; I-395 from Springfield to 14th Street Bridges

Major junctions
- South end: I-95 / US 1 in Colchester
- SR 286 in Springfield; I-95 / I-495 in Springfield; SR 7 in Alexandria; SR 27 in Arlington; US 1 / SR 110 in Arlington
- North end: I-395 / US 1 in Arlington at 14th Street Bridges

Location
- Country: United States
- State: Virginia

Highway system
- Virginia Routes; Interstate; US; Primary; Secondary; Byways; History; HOT lanes
← SR 349	→ SR 351

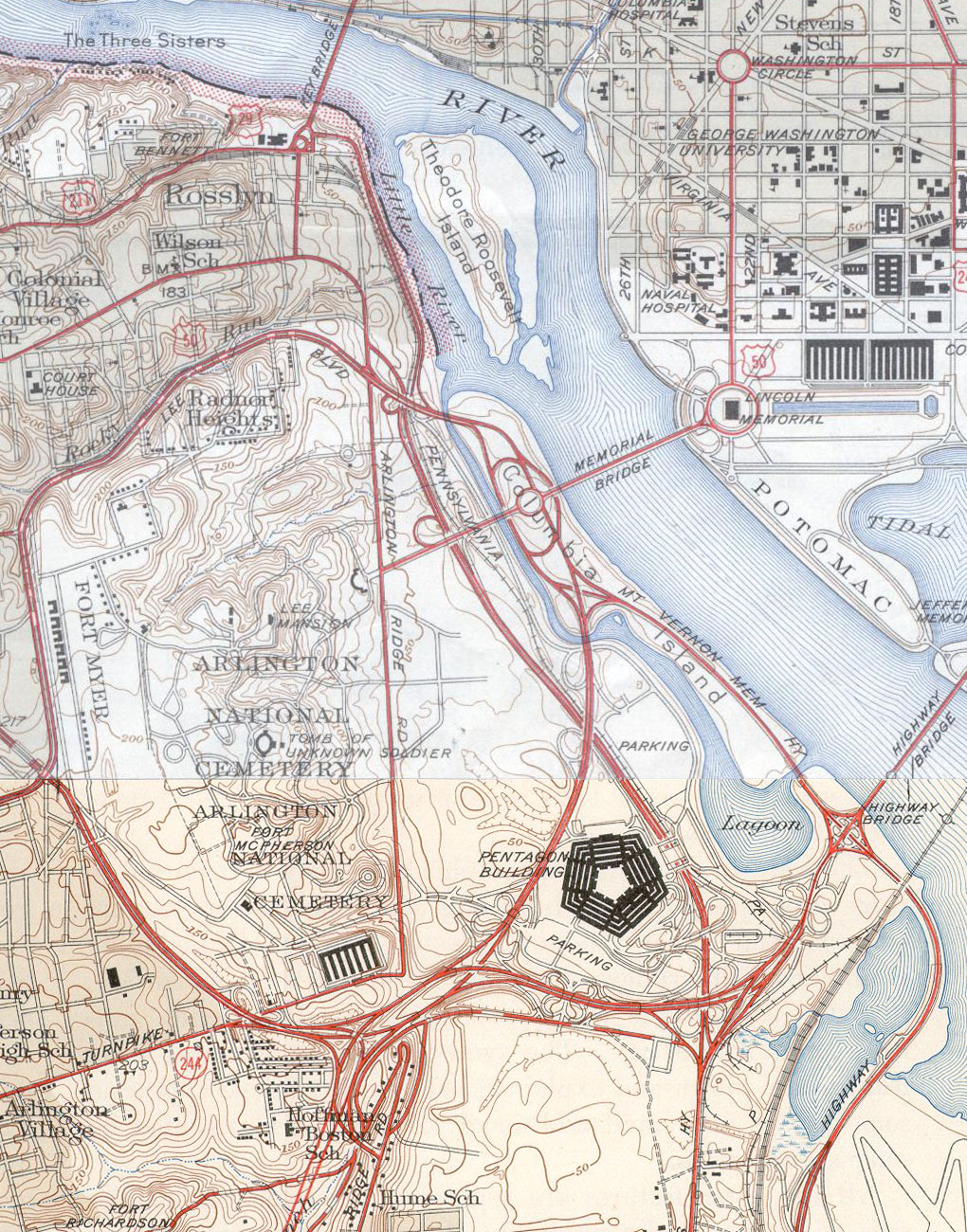
1945 map of the Pentagon road network, including part of the Shirley Highway

The Henry G. Shirley Memorial Highway, often shortened to Shirley Highway, consists of a 17.3-mile (27.8 km) portion of Interstates 95 and 395 in the U.S. Commonwealth of Virginia. Shirley Highway was the first limited-access freeway in Virginia. Begun in 1941, the road was completed from U.S. Route 1 in Colchester, Virginia, just north of Woodbridge, to the 14th Street Bridge over the Potomac River between Virginia and Washington, D.C. in 1952.

== History ==
=== 20th century ===
The Shirley Highway is named in honor of Henry G. Shirley, the head of the Virginia Department of Highways, now Virginia Department of Transportation, from 1922 to 1941, who died in July, 1941, just a few weeks after giving the "go-ahead" for work on the new highway. The road was originally a four-lane highway, and it was designated State Route 350 from its southern intersection with U.S. Route 1 north of the Occoquan River near Woodbridge, Virginia, and its northern intersection with U.S. Route 1 near the Pentagon in Arlington, Virginia.

Construction began in October 1941. The first section in Arlington, from the Pentagon south to State Route 7, mostly two lanes, was opened in October 1943. This section was completed with four lanes in October 1944. Due to World War II constraints, the new highway had an unusual at-grade railroad crossing instead of a bridge over the Washington and Old Dominion Railroad just north of Shirlington Circle. This location was the site of a fatal collision between a train and a dump truck on June 26, 1952.

The remaining portions of the Shirley Highway south to U.S. Route 1 in Colchester, just north of Woodbridge, were completed in 1952. It facilitated the rapid development of Arlington County in the Shirlington, Parkfairfax, and Fairlington neighborhoods during World War II, and during that period connected the city to suburban shopping opportunities at Shirlington Shopping Center, which at the time was a five-minute drive away.

== The original "Mixing Bowl": largest in the world ==
The new Shirley Highway included the "Mixing Bowl" interchange complex near the newly completed Pentagon (War Department Building), which was completed in 1944. At this location, the State Route 27 freeway (Washington Blvd.) merges with the Shirley Highway and then branches off again. The original interchange had a merge section each way, about 1/3 mile long, with a third "mixing lane" where the vehicles would weave when they wanted to change to the other freeway. It was rebuilt in the 1960s. After rebuilding, it was the largest interchange complex in the world. There are currently 52 lane-miles of roadways and ramps, with four freeway junctions and numerous local ramps, and with several interchanges to the reversible express (HOV) roadway, all within a 2.5-mile (4.0 km) section of the Shirley Highway.

== I-95, I-395 ==
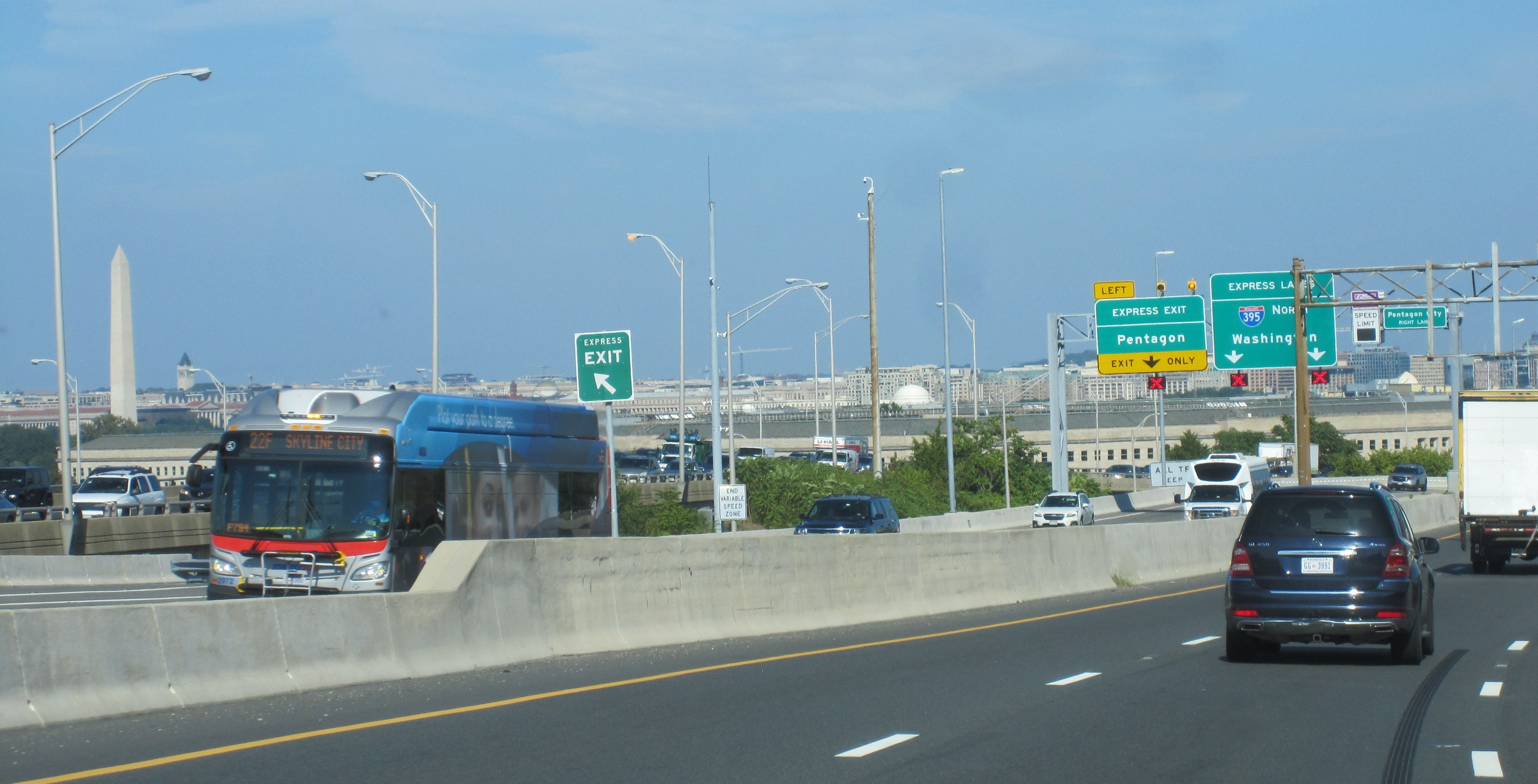
The Washington Monument seen from I-395 in Arlington County, Virginia

From 1965 to 1975, the Shirley Highway was reconstructed to Interstate Highway System standards. As portions were completed, they were designated as Interstate 95. This project led to the purchase and demolition of the Twin Bridges Hot Shoppes Restaurant and the closure of the Washington & Old Dominion Railroad - the latter of which delayed the widening of the highway while a fight over its abandonment was resolved. Original plans called for I-95 to cut straight through Washington, D.C., and connect with the Capital Beltway (I-495) in Maryland. However, community opposition halted this plan in 1977, diverting planned funding to construction of the Washington Metro subway system.

Because of the cancellation of the originally-proposed section of I-95 from New York Avenue in the District of Columbia, northward into Prince George's County to Interstate 495, the Capital Beltway, the I-95 designation was rerouted onto the eastern half of the Beltway. The remaining portion of the Shirley Highway north of Springfield was redesignated Interstate 395, which continues into D.C. to its end at U.S. Route 50 (New York Avenue).

=== Shirley Busway ===
On September 22, 1969, the reversible roadway between Edsall Road and SR 7 was converted to the first separated bus rapid transit (BRT) route on an Interstate highway during peak morning commute hours (0630–0930); this was extended north to Shirlington the next day. The busway was extended to north of Glebe Road in September 1970, and then to the new Center Span Bridge on April 5, 1971. The Shirley Highway Express Bus-on-Freeway Project was implemented from June 1971 to the end of 1974, demonstrating that BRT on a highway was a feasible way to boost public transit ridership and on-time performance. However, compared to the Lindenwold High Speed Line, a light rail service of comparable distance serving approximately the same number of people, Prof. Vukan R. Vuchic found the Shirley Busway had fewer riders and revenue.

== Springfield Interchange ==
The roots of the Springfield Interchange began with the Shirley Highway. This jumble of highways in Springfield, Virginia, where I-395, I-95, and the Capital Beltway meet, is officially called the "Springfield Interchange." It is colloquially referred to as the "Mixing Bowl," but highway officials still use that terminology to refer to the interchange complex at the Pentagon (see Pentagon road network).

== Exit list ==
County	Location	mi	km	Exit	Destinations	Notes
Fairfax	Lorton	161.17	259.38	—	I-95 south – Richmond	Southern terminus of Shirley Highway
Fairfax	Lorton	161.17	259.38	161	US 1 south – Woodbridge	Southern terminus of Shirley Highway
Fairfax	Lorton	161.17	259.38	—	US 1 south – Woodbridge	Southern terminus of Shirley Highway; southbound exit and northbound entrance for I-95 Express lanes
Fairfax	Lorton	163.66	263.39	163	SR 642 – Lorton	
Fairfax	Newington	165.56	266.44	—	I-95 Express north	Northbound exit only
Fairfax	Newington			—	Alban Road / Boudinot Drive	Southbound entrance only for I-95 Express lanes
Fairfax	Newington	166.8	268.4	166	SR 286 (Fairfax County Parkway) / Backlick Road (SR 617) / Fullerton Road / Heller Road – Newington, Fort Belvoir	Signed as exits 166A (south) and 166B (north); Heller Rd. not signed northbound; Backlick Rd./Fullerton Rd. not signed southbound
Fairfax	Newington			—	I-95 Express south	Southbound exit and northbound entrance
Fairfax	Newington			167	SR 617 south (Backlick Road) / Fullerton Road	Southbound exit only
Fairfax	Springfield	169.05	272.06	169A-B	SR 644 – Franconia, Springfield	No southbound exit; southbound access from I-395 exit 1B
Fairfax	Springfield	169.05	272.06	—	SR 289 (Franconia-Springfield Parkway)	I-95 Express lane interchange
Fairfax	Springfield	169.05	272.06	—	I-95 Express north	Northbound exit and southbound entrance
Fairfax	Springfield	169.05	272.06	—	SR 644 west – Springfield	Southbound exit and northbound entrance for I-95 Express lanes
Fairfax	Springfield			—	I-95 north / I-495 east / Capital Beltway – Baltimore	Northbound exit and southbound entrance; part of Springfield Interchange; southern terminus of I-395
Fairfax	Springfield			170B	I-495 north / Capital Beltway – Tysons Corner	Northbound exit and southbound entrance; part of Springfield Interchange; continuation onto I-395 northbound signed as exit 170A
Fairfax	Springfield			—	I-95 north / I-495 / Capital Beltway – Baltimore, Tysons Corner	Express lane interchange; part of Springfield Interchange; transition from I-95 Express lanes to I-395 Express lanes
Fairfax	Springfield			1B	SR 644 – Franconia, Springfield	Southbound exit; part of Springfield Interchange; continuation onto I-95 southbound signed as exit 1A
Fairfax	Springfield			1C	I-95 north / I-495 east / Capital Beltway – Baltimore	Southbound exit and northbound entrance; part of Springfield Interchange
Fairfax	Springfield			1D	I-495 north / Capital Beltway – Tysons Corner	Southbound exit and northbound entrance; part of Springfield Interchange
Fairfax	Springfield	0.40	0.64	2A	SR 648 east (Edsall Road)	
Fairfax	Springfield	0.40	0.64	2B	SR 648 west (Edsall Road)	
Fairfax	Springfield	1.10	1.77	—	I-395 Express south	Southbound exit and northbound entrance
Fairfax	Springfield	1.10	1.77	—	I-395 Express south / I-395 north (HOV Lanes)	Current northern terminus of I-395 Express lanes and southern terminus of HOV lanes
Fairfax	Springfield	1.10	1.77	—	I-395 north (HOV Lanes)	Northbound exit and southbound entrance
City of Alexandria		2.00	3.22	3A	SR 236 east (Duke Street) – Landmark	
City of Alexandria		2.00	3.22	3B	SR 236 west (Little River Turnpike) – Lincolnia	
City of Alexandria		3.70	5.95	4	Seminary Road (SR 420)	Includes full access to and from HOV lanes
City of Alexandria		4.60	7.40	5	SR 7 (King Street)	
Arlington	Shirlington	5.40	8.69	6	Shirlington	Southbound access is part of exit 7; includes exit ramp to Quaker Lane
Arlington	Shirlington	5.40	8.69	—	Shirlington	Southbound exit and northbound entrance via HOV lanes only
Arlington	Shirlington	5.90	9.50	7	SR 120 (South Glebe Road) – Marymount University, Shirlington	Signed as exits 7A (south) and 7B (north/Marymount) northbound; southbound exit includes exit ramp to Quaker Lane
Arlington	Arlington Ridge	6.90	11.10	8A	SR 27 west (Washington Boulevard) to SR 244 (Columbia Pike) / South Arlington Ridge Road – Pentagon South Parking	SR 244 (Columbia Pike) signed northbound only; Pentagon South Parking/South Arlington Ridge Road signed southbound only
Arlington	Pentagon City			—	SR 27 east / Arlington Memorial Bridge	Northbound exit and southbound entrance via HOV lanes only
Arlington	Pentagon City	7.50	12.07	8B	SR 27 east (Washington Boulevard) – Pentagon, Arlington Cemetery, Rosslyn	Northbound exit and southbound entrance
Arlington	Pentagon City				I-395 (HOV Lanes)	Southbound entrance only from HOV lanes
Arlington	Pentagon City			—	Pentagon	Access via HOV lanes only
Arlington	Pentagon City	8.00	12.87	8B	SR 110 north to I-66 west – Rosslyn	Southbound exit and northbound entrance
Arlington	Crystal City	8.40	13.52	8C	US 1 south – Pentagon City, Crystal City, Reagan National Airport, Alexandria	Southern terminus of concurrency with US 1; left exit southbound; northbound signed as "To US 1"
Arlington	Crystal City	8.50	13.68		I-395 north (HOV 3+)	Northbound exit and southbound entrance; future northern terminus of I-395 Express Lanes; HOV lanes to continue north as before
Arlington	Crystal City	8.70	14.00	9	Clark Street	Northbound exit is part of exit 10A
Arlington	Long Bridge Park	8.90– 9.00	14.32– 14.48	10	Boundary Channel Drive – Pentagon North Parking	Signed as exit 10A
Arlington	Long Bridge Park	8.90– 9.00	14.32– 14.48	10	George Washington Parkway – Memorial Bridge, Reagan National Airport, Mount Vernon	Signed as exits 10B (south) and 10C (north)
Potomac River		9.91	15.95	14th Street Bridges		
Potomac River		9.91	15.95	—	I-395 north / US 1 north – Washington	Continues into the District of Columbia as Southwest Freeway
1.000 mi = 1.609 km; 1.000 km = 0.621 mi: Concurrency terminus; Electronic toll collection; HOV only; Incomplete access
