= Fairlington, Virginia =

- Fairlington Historic District
- U.S. National Register of Historic Places
- U.S. Historic district
- Virginia Landmarks Register
- Location within Northern Virginia Location within Virginia Location within the United States
- Location: Roughly bounded by Quaker Lane, King St., I-395, S. Walter Reed Dr., and S. Abingdon St., Arlington, Virginia
- Coordinates: 38°50′5″N 77°5′35″W
- Area: 322 acres (130 ha)
- Built: 1942
- Architect: Franzheim, Kenneth; et al.
- Architectural style: Colonial Revival
- NRHP reference No.: 99000368
- VLR No.: 000-5772

Significant dates
- Added to NRHP: March 29, 1999
- Designated VLR: December 2, 1998

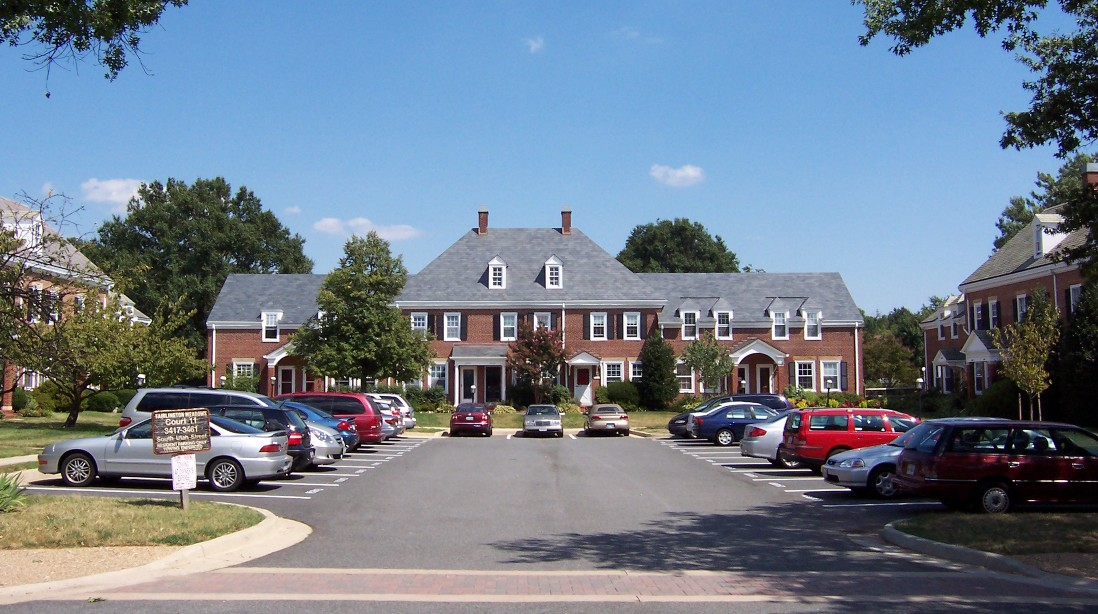
Apartment building in South Fairlington

Fairlington is an unincorporated neighborhood in Arlington County, Virginia, located adjacent to Shirlington in the southernmost part of the county on the boundary with the City of Alexandria. The main thoroughfares are Interstate 395 (Shirley Highway), which divides the neighborhood into North and South Fairlington, State Route 7 (King Street) and State Route 402 (Quaker Lane).

The neighborhood consists of primarily of a mix of townhouse and condominium apartments built in the 1940s as the largest housing project financed by the Defense Homes Corporation during World War II. Fairlington is listed on both the National Register of Historic Places and on the Virginia Landmarks Register.

== Name, boundaries, and geography ==
Fairlington was originally called Seminary Heights but it was changed due to confusion with other nearby geographical features named for Alexandria's Virginia Theological Seminary including Seminary Drive, Seminary Road, and Seminary View, among others. A new name, Fairlington, was chosen combining the two counties in which the neighborhood was then located: Fairfax and Arlington. The former Fairfax County section is now part of the City of Alexandria.

The neighborhood is wooded and sits on heights overlooking the Four Mile Run valley. It is bisected by I-395 into North and South Fairlington connected by the Fairlington Bridge (South Abingdon Street).

== History ==
=== Early history ===
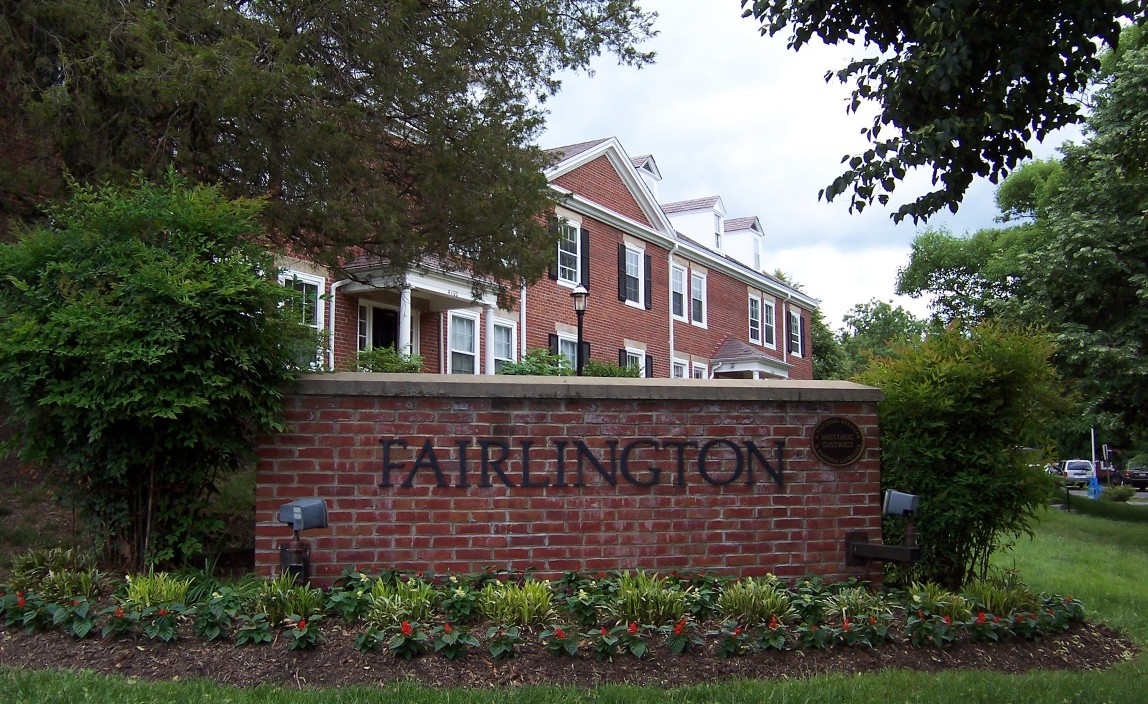
Fairlington Entrance at 32nd Road South

Upon the arrival of Europeans in the New World, the area that is now Fairlington was near a Necostin Indian village in the 17th century. In the early 18th century, a 534-acre (216 ha) tract including Fairlington and extending to nearby Four Mile Run was granted under the headright system to William Struttfield, one of 48 original landowners in what is now Arlington County. By 1756, the land was owned by John Carlyle, a friend of future U.S. President George Washington, who was also the builder of Carlyle House in Alexandria. Carlyle and his heirs would possess the area of Fairlington for 150 years. Around 1770, Caryle began construction of a plantation and summer house near the current intersection of 30th Street South and South Columbus Street. The house was first called Torthorwald and later changed to Morven and stood until 1942. Carlyle used his plantation as a stud farm and operated a grist mill downstream from Fairlington above what is now Arlandria. Following John Carlyle's death in 1780, the house passed to his grandson, Carlyle Fairfax Whiting. George Washington himself owned a portion of the land in what would become Fairlington, near the Abingdon Elementary School and South 28th Street after he bought two of the 48 Arlington land grants.

Following the American Revolution, new federal district governed by Congress was created in 1790 and the area that is now Fairlington (except for part of the section now within Alexandria) was included within the original boundaries of the new District of Columbia, forming part of Alexandria County, D.C. Congressional control began in 1801 and the area was no longer under Virginian jurisdiction. However, in 1846, the entire county was retroceded to Virginia and became Alexandria County, Virginia.

=== From Union occupation to World War II ===
With the secession of Virginia from the United States on 17 April 1861, Northern Virginia was quickly occupied by the United States military. A line of redoubts and breastworks above Four Mile Run was constructed to defend the main base of the occupying Army of the Potomac in Alexandria and the Fairlington area was the site of two of these. Fort Reynolds, a redoubt, was constructed in September 1861 to command the approach to Alexandria by way of the Four Mile Run valley. It had a perimeter of 360 yards (330 m) and emplacements for 12 guns and was located just northeast of what is now 31st Street South at South Woodrow Street. Battery Garesche at what is now South Abingdon Street at South 30th Road and was constructed late in 1861 to control the higher ground dominating Fort Reynolds, 200 yards (180 m) to the southeast. It had a perimeter of 166 yards (152 m) and emplacements for 8 guns. The area was never taken by Confederate forces and remained under U.S. military control until 1870.

Despite the military use of what is now Fairlington, the area retained a rural character—mostly wooded, with some small farms—into the 20th century. In 1879, the area of Fairlington was consolidated under Hawkins Smith who remodeled Morven and renamed it Hampton. His son, Hawkins Smith II, made Hampton a leading horse farm but sold it in 1926. It was subdivided with some of the land rented by sharecroppers. One cleared area in South Fairlington served as an airfield until the mid-1930s.

In 1920, Alexandria County was renamed Arlington County to distinguish it from the neighboring independent City of Alexandria and in 1929, Alexandria annexed all of Arlington County south of Four Mile Run to the current boundary along Quaker Lane.

=== The creation of Fairlington ===
Fairlington historical marker

At the time of the United States entry into World War II in December 1941, the Defense Homes Corporation (a component of the Federal Housing Administration) had purchased most of the area. The corporation was created by President Franklin D. Roosevelt in 1940 through the allocation of emergency funding and, by February 1942, it had assembled 322 acres (130 ha) for construction of housing for civilian and military defense personnel to be called Seminary Heights. The site was only 2 1/2 miles (4.0 km) from the Pentagon which had begun construction in August 1941. As with nearby Parkfairfax, Alexandria, and several other sites throughout metropolitan Washington, the Corporation endeavored to quickly satisfy increased wartime demand for housing and, by the end of 1943, by which time the project was renamed Fairlington, there were almost 2,415 housing units completed. By 1945, there were 3,439 units when the project was completed at a cost of $35 million ($626 million in 2025 dollars).

In 1947, the Defense Homes Corporation sold the property to Fairmac Realty Corporation, which operated Fairlington as rental apartments. The area surrounding Fairlington also began to urbanize with nearby Shirlington Shopping Center opening in 1945 and Bradlee Shopping Center in the 1950s.

In 1952, the independent City of Alexandria annexed the small Fairfax County portion of Fairlington, rendering the name an anachronism. In 1966, a mutual agreement between Arlington and Alexandria adjusted the city-county boundary through North Fairlington that had followed the original District of Columbia-Virginia line. The new boundary followed the north and east sides of State Route 7 (King Street), 30th Street South, South Columbus Street, and 28th Street South. In 1954, the well-preserved Fort Reynolds was leveled to construct the Park Shirlington apartments.

In 1967, as part of the conversion of Shirley Highway to interstate standards, a bridge connecting South Abingdon Street in North Fairlington and 34th Street South in South Fairlington was opened, directly connecting the two sections for the first time.

=== Fairlington as condominiums ===
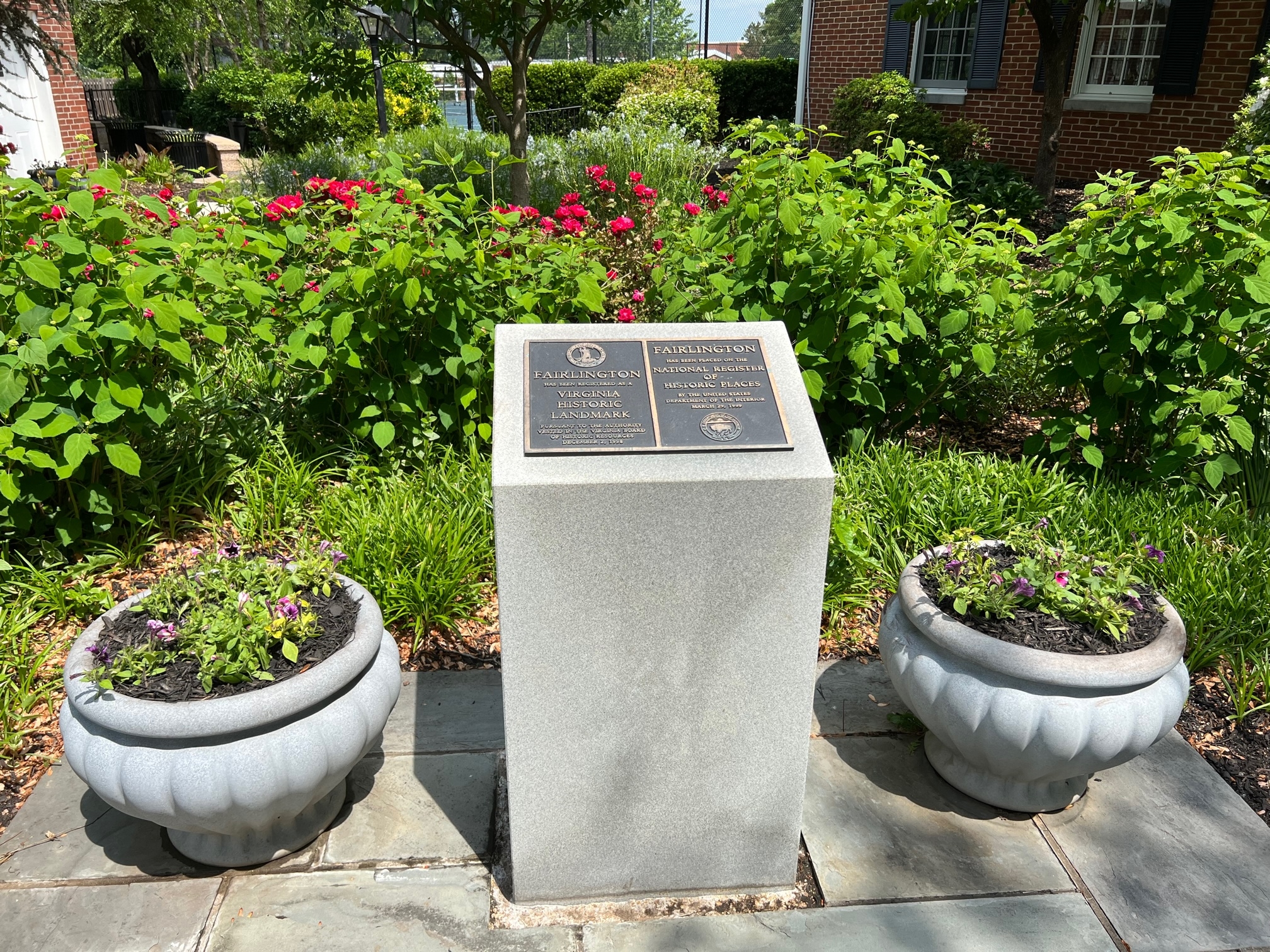
Fairlington Virginia Historic Landmark/NRHP marker

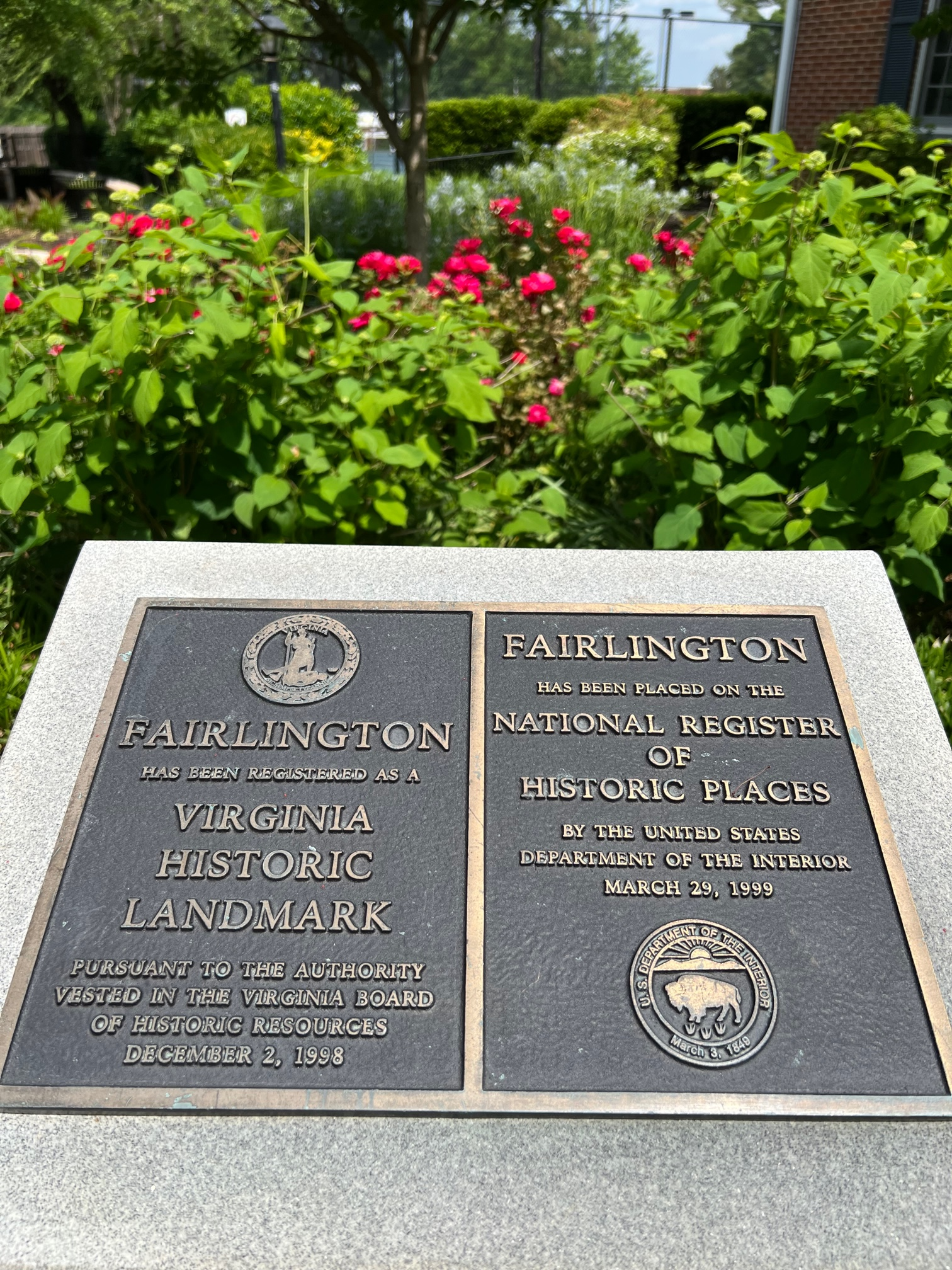
Closeup of the Fairlington Virginia Historic Landmark/NRHP marker

By the late 1960s, Fairlington's owners, now Hartford Insurance, considered razing the apartments and constructing high-rise apartment buildings. Instead, it decided to convert the existing structures to condominium apartments in 1972. Virginia had only permitted condominium development since 1962 and Fairlington was the largest scale project ever undertaken to that date. Fairlington was sold to Chicago Bridge and Iron and operated by CBI-Fairmac; a five-year project to physically modify the apartments for their new use commenced. Common basement areas were divided between apartments and boiler houses were removed and replaced with recreation facilities. Beginning in South Fairlington, CBI-Fairmac converted the area into seven legal entities under the Virginia Horizontal Property Act. Six of the condominiums were in South Fairlington and the entirety of North Fairlington formed one condominium. The initial offerings sold for $19,000–$45,500 ($146,000–$350,000 in 2025 dollars) in 1972 and prices were increased for later sales with the final units sold in 1978.

In 1979, Fairlington Elementary School was closed and the building became the Fairlington Community Center.

In 1996, the value of Fairlington was assessed at $423,701,600 ($869,788,000 in 2025 dollars). Fairlington as a whole was listed on the Virginia Landmarks Register in December 1998 and the National Register of Historic Places in March 1999.

=== Historical marker ===
An Arlington County Office of Historic Preservation historical marker installed at the corner of Quaker Lane and South 32nd Street reads:

"Designed in the Colonial Revival style by Kenneth Franzheim and Alan B. Mills and constructed between 1942 and 1944, Fairlington is an early example of successful community planning and large-scale, publicly financed rental housing built for defense workers and their families during World War II. With 3,439 garden apartments, Fairlington was the largest project financed by Defense Homes Corporation (a component of the National Housing Agency) and the nation's largest apartment complex at that time. The units were renovated and sold as condominiums between 1972 and 1977. The name Fairlington combines Fairfax and Arlington, the counties in which the project was located."

== Civic organization ==
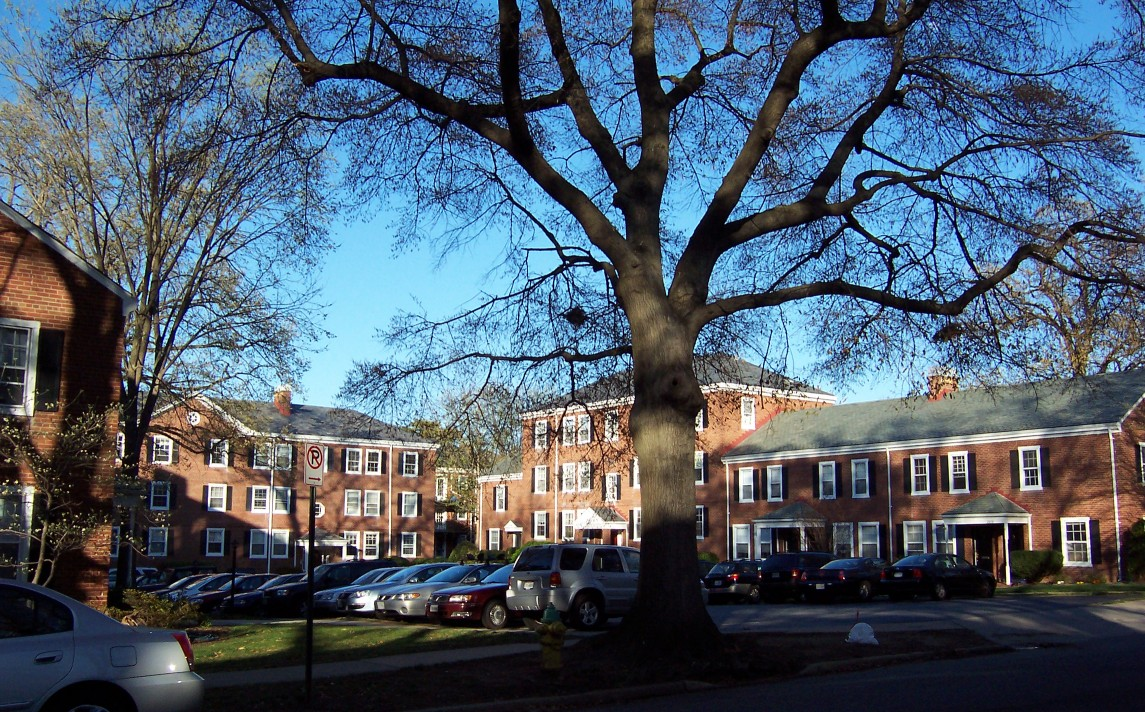
Apartments in North Fairlington

Fairlington is organized into seven, independent condominium associations sometimes called villages including Fairlington Arbor, Fairlington Commons, Fairlington Glen, Fairlington Green, Fairlington Meadows, and Fairlington Mews, all in South Fairlington, and Fairlington Villages in North Fairlington. There is a single civic association, the Fairlington Citizens Association, representing the community in local affairs and the Fairlington Historical Society promotes historical preservation.

== Physical environment ==
=== Layout ===
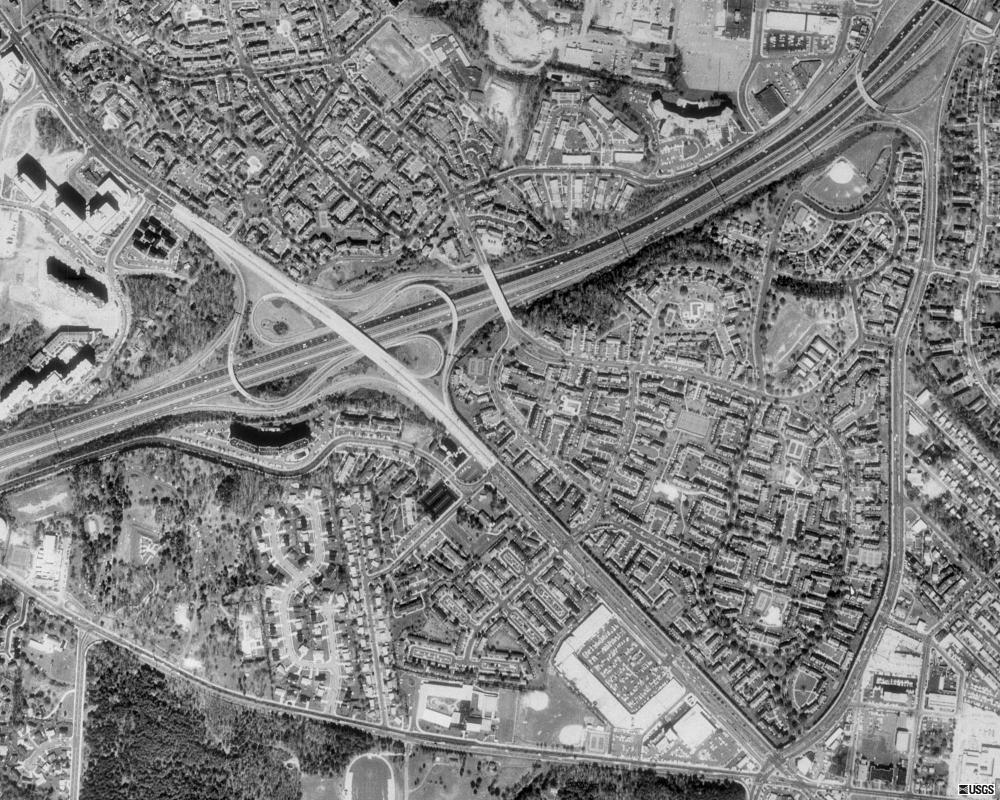
1988 aerial photograph of Fairlington

Fairlington's streets are all two lanes and they are neither on a grid with uniform city blocks nor in the suburban cul-de-sac style found in most American suburbs but are slightly winding and usually separated by the equivalent of two or more city blocks. Fairlington's apartment units are grouped in "courts," usually three or four separate buildings of around 40-50 total units facing a parking lot (carpark). Most units are three levels (upstairs, ground level and basement) with front and back doors. Some units are two or three story walk-ups with units on a single floor. Prior to the condominium conversions, back doors opened to common areas with connecting sidewalks leading to back porches. Post-conversions, most units have a small courtyard off the back door, surrounded by a wooden fence. The common areas between the courts contain open areas for recreation. Originally the common areas included playgrounds and wading pools. The latter consisted of flat concrete squares with short concrete sides and a sprinkler in the center. These provided cooling and recreation in the summer when air conditioning was not widely available. With the conversion to condominiums, tennis, basketball courts, playgrounds, and swimming facilities replaced the original playgrounds and wading pools. Prior to the condominium conversions, each building had a common basement area, which could be reached from the basement of apartments which had basements, or from a stairway in buildings containing single-floor apartments. Common basements could also be accessed from outside the apartments via an exterior stairway. The common basement contained trashrooms and laundry facilities. Buildings with single-floor apartments also had storage units in the common basements. With the condominium conversions, the common areas were divided to become part of the basement areas of individual condominiums. Exterior access to what had been common areas was removed. Sidewalks (pavements) along the streets and in the common areas connect the neighborhood. Each condominium association in South Fairlington consists of around 15 courts.

=== Architecture ===
Fairlington's nomination to the National Register of Historic Places identifies 1024 historical buildings in Fairlington and 30 residential unit types and describes North and South Fairlington as follows:

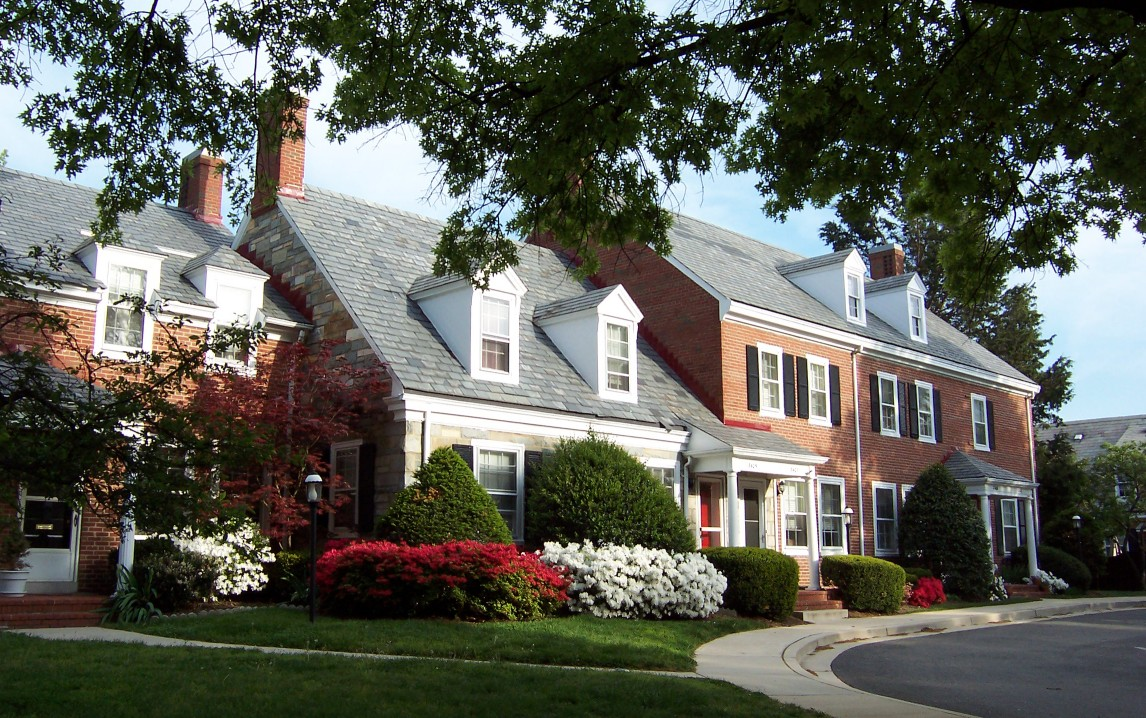
Townhouses in South Fairlington

In terms of style, materials and detailing, the two sections are very similar. All buildings are of the Colonial Revival style. Building heights range from 1½ to three stories. Gable roofs predominate, followed by hipped roofs, flat roofs, gambrel roofs, and a handful of mansard roofs. Most are slate. Walls primarily are brick, laid in five- or six-course American bond, although a few of the 1½-story buildings with steeply pitched gable roofs are of cut stone. Windows are six-over-six double-hung sash. Exterior doors are paneled, with or without lights. Front entrances are sheltered by porches or stoops. All of the one-story, one-bay porches feature hipped, shed or gable roofs supported by wooden Tuscan or Doric columns, square or turned wooden posts or brick piers. Front entrance stoops often are sheltered by bracketed canopies. Many buildings have nonfunctioning brick chimneys. Typical details include dentils and other decorative wood molding, stone window and door lintels, pilasters, sidelights, wheel and round windows, belt courses and inoperative shutters.

In journalist David Brinkley's 1988 Washington Goes to War, he mentions the area, describing life there in the summer of 1943 noting its lack of shopping and transportation options. However, "Fairlington at least had sturdy, well-designed housing (most of it still standing today and now expensive townhouses and condominiums)." Fairlington is listed on the Virginia Landmarks Register and the National Register of Historic Places and, in 2002, the neighborhood was presented the "Test of Time" award by the Virginia Society of the American Institute of Architects, for the lasting value of its architectural design. Such listings and awards do not impose restrictions on property use which is the under the purview of the condominiums. Fairlington was the first large-scale apartment community to be considered for such designation and the campaign for listing was largely a volunteer effort.

=== Arboriculture ===
Fairlington's streets and common areas are heavily treed with oaks, maples, elms, and sycamores (planes). A Fairlington Notable Tree Walk showcases some of the more unusual trees in the area.

== Transportation ==
=== Roads ===
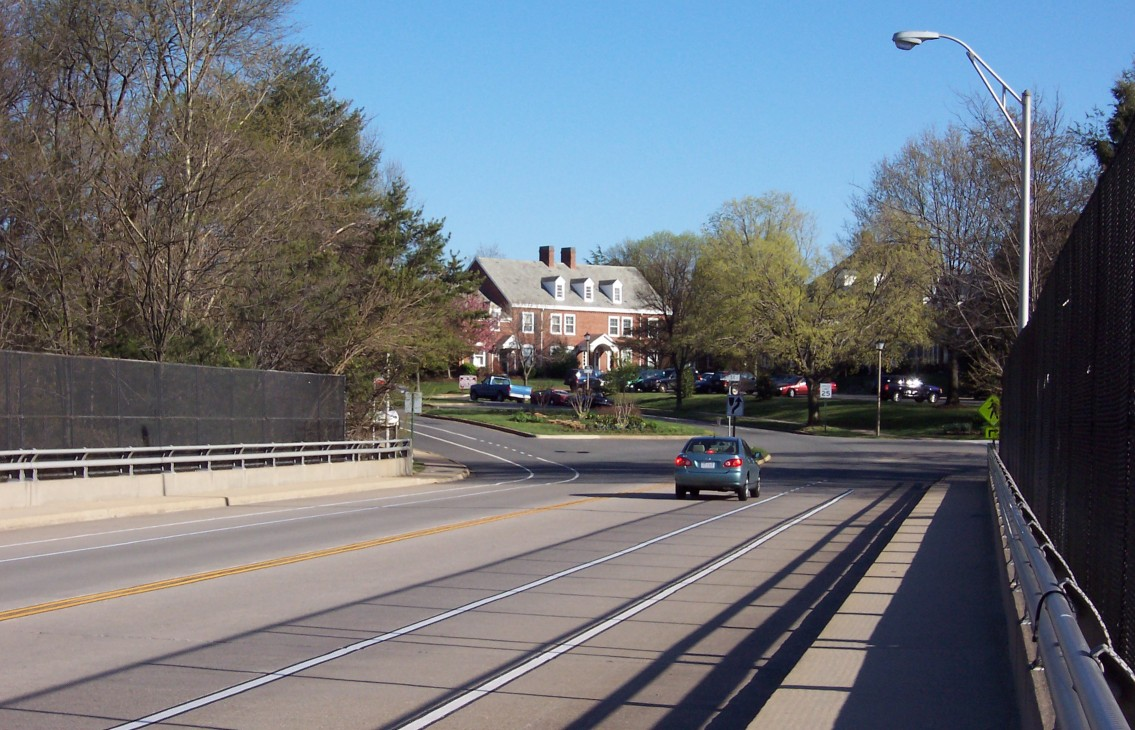
Fairlington Bridge (South Abingdon Street) over I-395

The controlled access Interstate 395 (Shirley Highway) divides Fairlington and is bridged by South Abingdon Street within the neighborhood but provides no direct access. State Route 7 (King Street) and State Route 402 (Quaker Lane) bound the neighborhood on the southwest and east respectively but are largely separated from it by chain link fencing with access only at street entrances.

Although Fairlington's street names and addresses follow the rules of the grid-style Arlington County's street-naming system, the streets do not follow a grid but are also not the suburban cul-de-sac style found in most American suburbs. Intersections consist of both four-way stops and modern roundabouts (traffic circles).

Within Fairlington there are both bicycle lanes and an on-street bicycle route.

=== Buses ===
Several Metrobus routes traverse the neighborhood and adjacent roads provide additional Metrobus and Alexandria's DASH bus service.

=== Rail ===
Several Washington Metro stations are within 3–4 miles (5–6 kilometers) of Fairlington and Metrobus and DASH directly connect the neighborhood with the King Street – Old Town Metro station in Alexandria and the Pentagon Metro station in Arlington.

Alexandria Union Station provides Amtrak and Virginia Railway Express service to the area and is accessible by DASH from Fairlington.

=== Airports ===
Fairlington is located 5 miles (8 km) from Ronald Reagan Washington National Airport in Arlington County and 25 miles (40 km) from Washington Dulles International Airport in Sterling, Virginia.

== Recreation and commerce ==
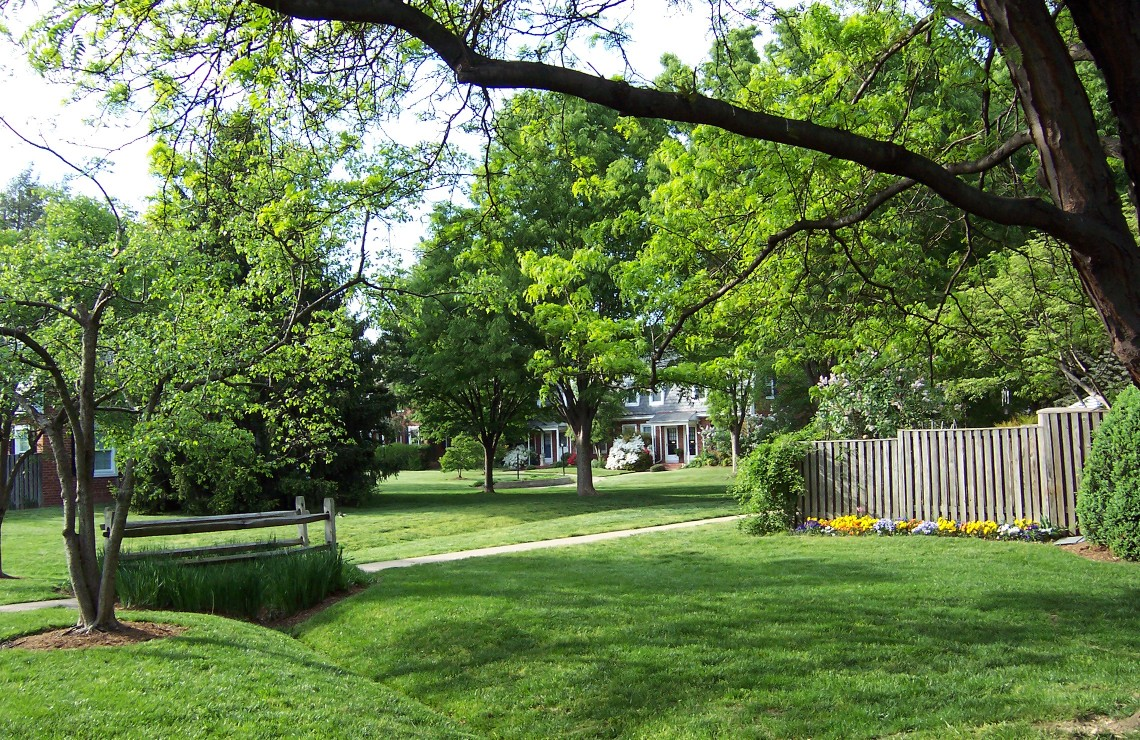
Fairlington Common Area

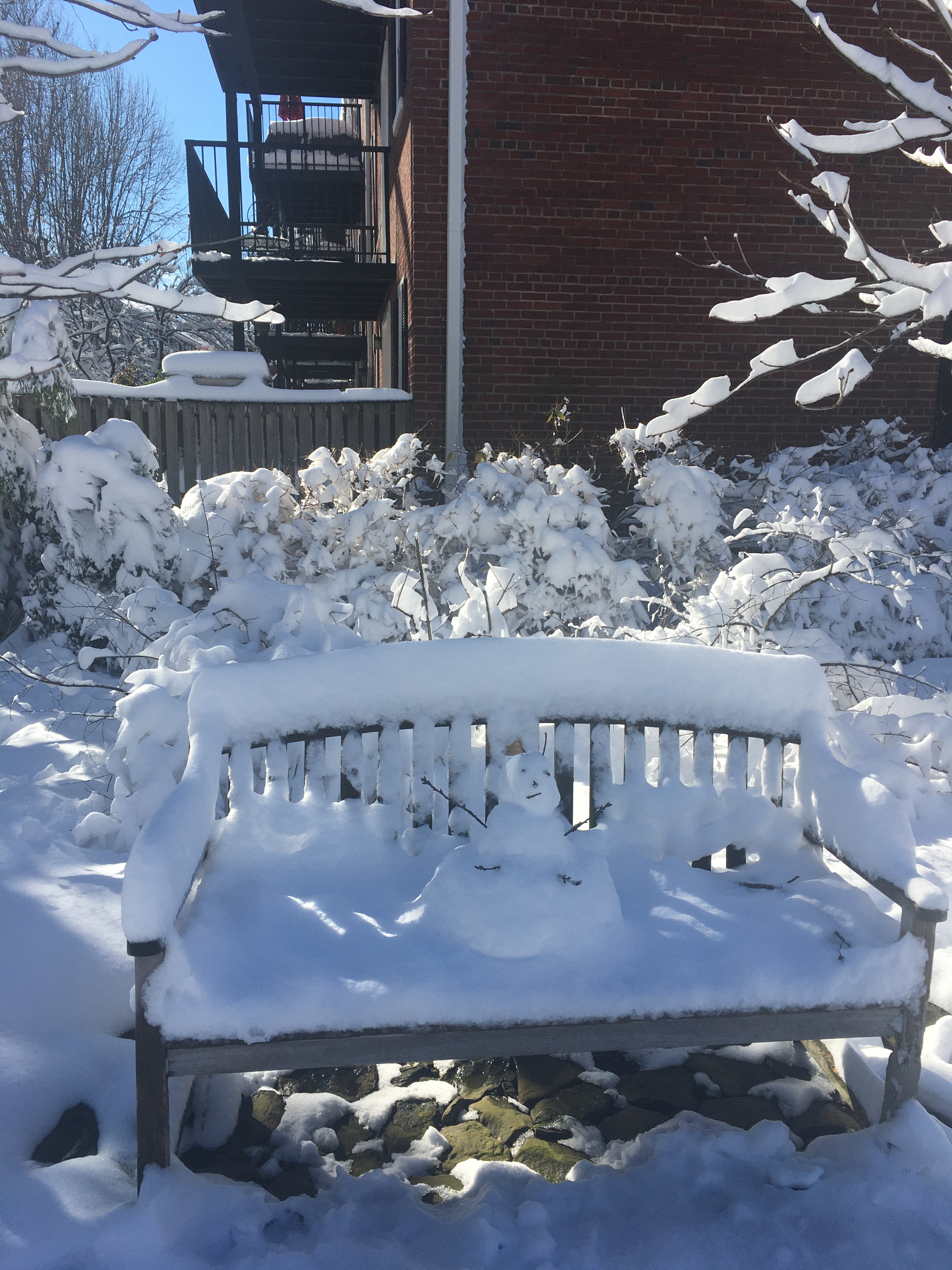
Snowman on common-area bench in North Fairlington

The Fairlington Community Center, which was once an elementary school, is located at the northeast corner of 34th Street South and South Stafford Streets in South Fairlington. It provides space for a number of community and recreational activities. Utah Field Park and Abingdon Elementary School also have space for public recreation. Each condominium association within Fairlington also maintains its own system of swimming pools and tennis and basketball courts for its own residents.

Within the confines of Fairlington, there are several commercial buildings that house local businesses such as health care service providers (dentist, physical therapy, chiropractic, etc.) and business offices (real estate, law, patent services, etc.) that cater to local residents and the broader community. Adjacent to Fairlington, The Village at Shirlington, provides restaurants, stores (shops), bars (pubs), a theater (theatre), a cinema, and the Washington & Old Dominion Railroad Trail trailhead within walking distance for North Fairlington residents. South Fairlington residents are connected to Shirlington by a pedestrian walkway that crosses the Shirlington Circle interchange with I-395.

The Fort Ward Museum and Historic Site, the Virginia Theological Seminary, both in Alexandria, are a short distance from South Fairlington. Alexandria's Bradlee and Fairlington shopping centers are adjacent to South Fairlington.

== Education ==
The public Abingdon Elementary School is on 30th Road South in North Fairlington and serves all of Fairlington as do Gunston Middle School and Wakefield High School.

The Arlington County Department of Parks, Recreation & Cultural Resources provides continuing education at the Fairlington Community Center. The Community Center began as the Fairlington Elementary School in 1940 and was converted into a community center in 1979.

== County and state services ==
Fairlington is in the 3rd District of the Arlington County Police Department which cooperates with the Fairlington Citizens Association. Arlington Fire Station No. 7 of the Arlington County Fire Department housing Engine 107, is located on South Abingdon Street in North Fairlington (temporarily closed due to structural/foundation issues). The Arlington County office of the Virginia Cooperative Extension Service is located in the Fairlington Community Center.

All of Fairlington, including the Alexandria portion, is in the 22206 ZIP code area and is served by the United States Postal Service's Shirlington Annex Post Office although the Parkfairfax Post Office in Alexandria is closer to most of Fairlington.

== See also ==
- List of Arlington County Historic Districts
- List of Registered Historic Places in Virginia
- Parkfairfax, Virginia
