= Shirlington, Virginia =

Human settlement in Arlington County, Virginia, United States of America

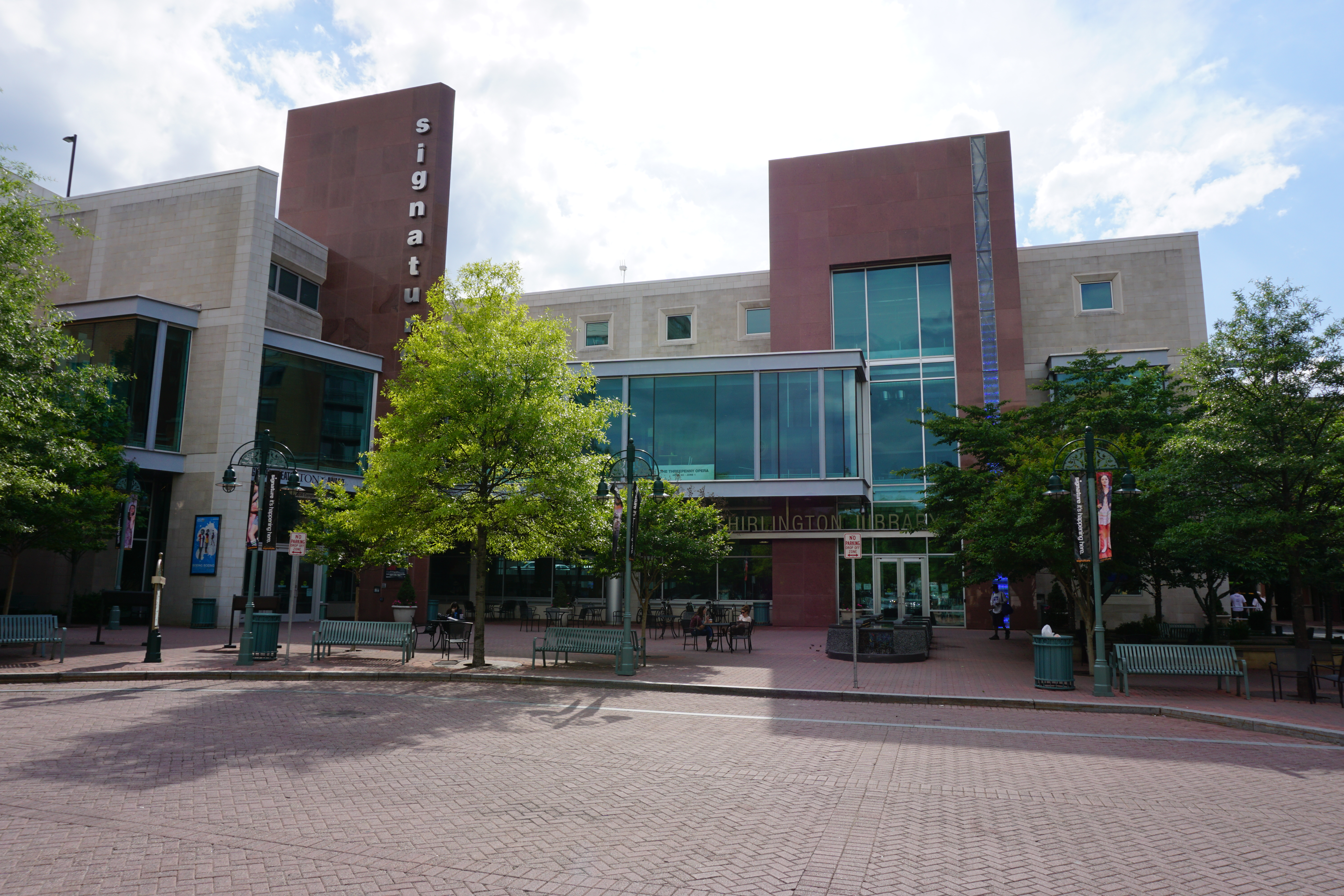
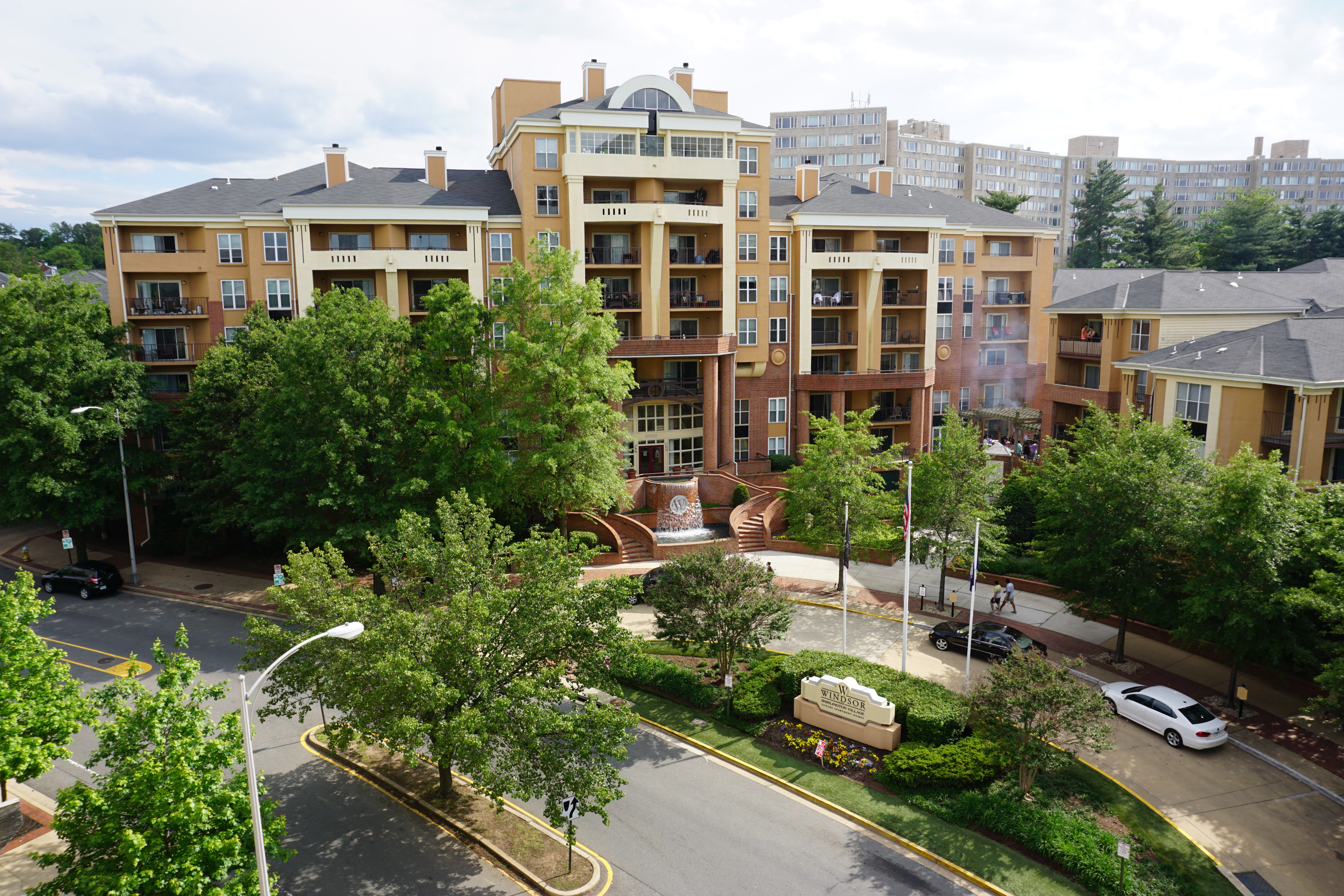
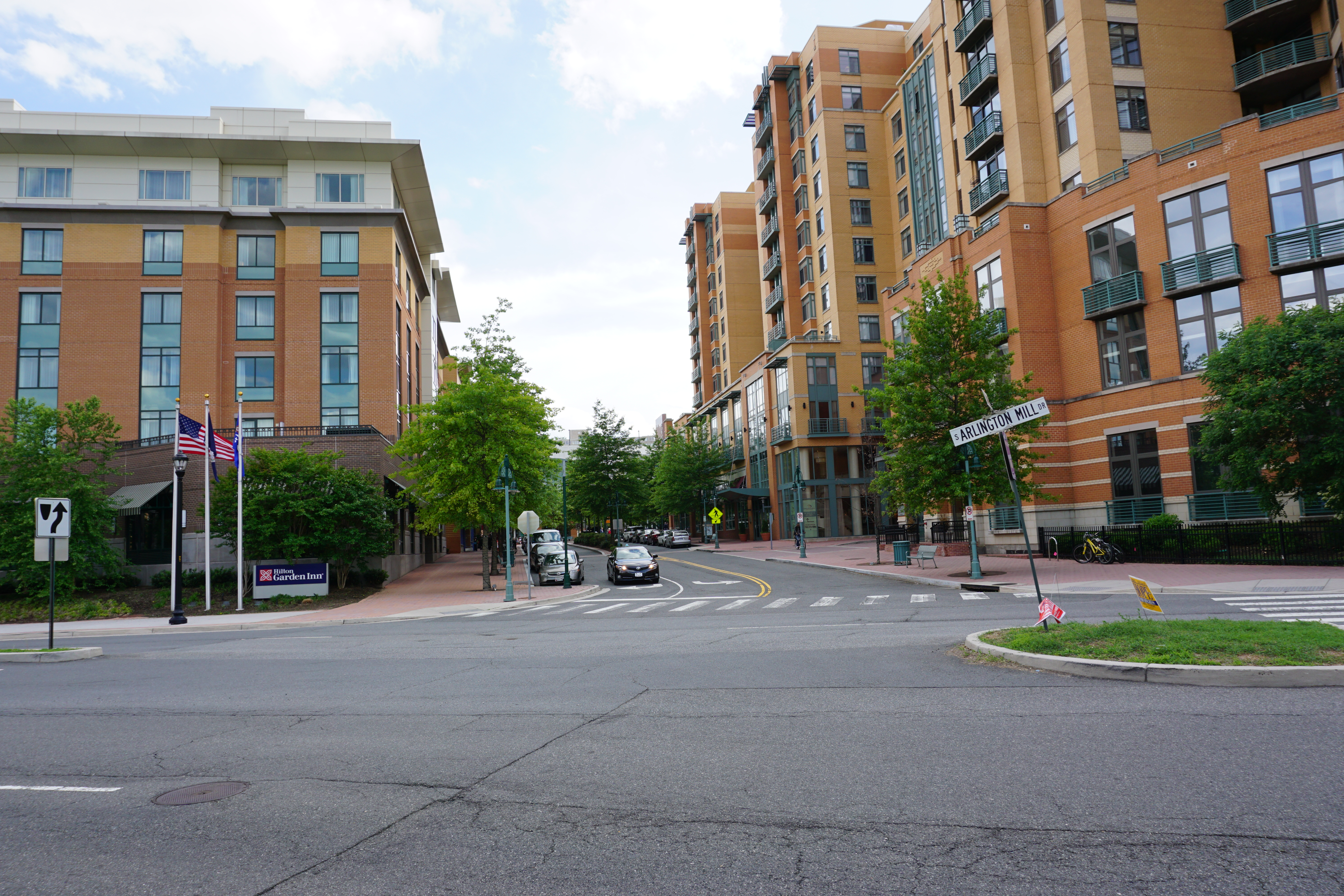
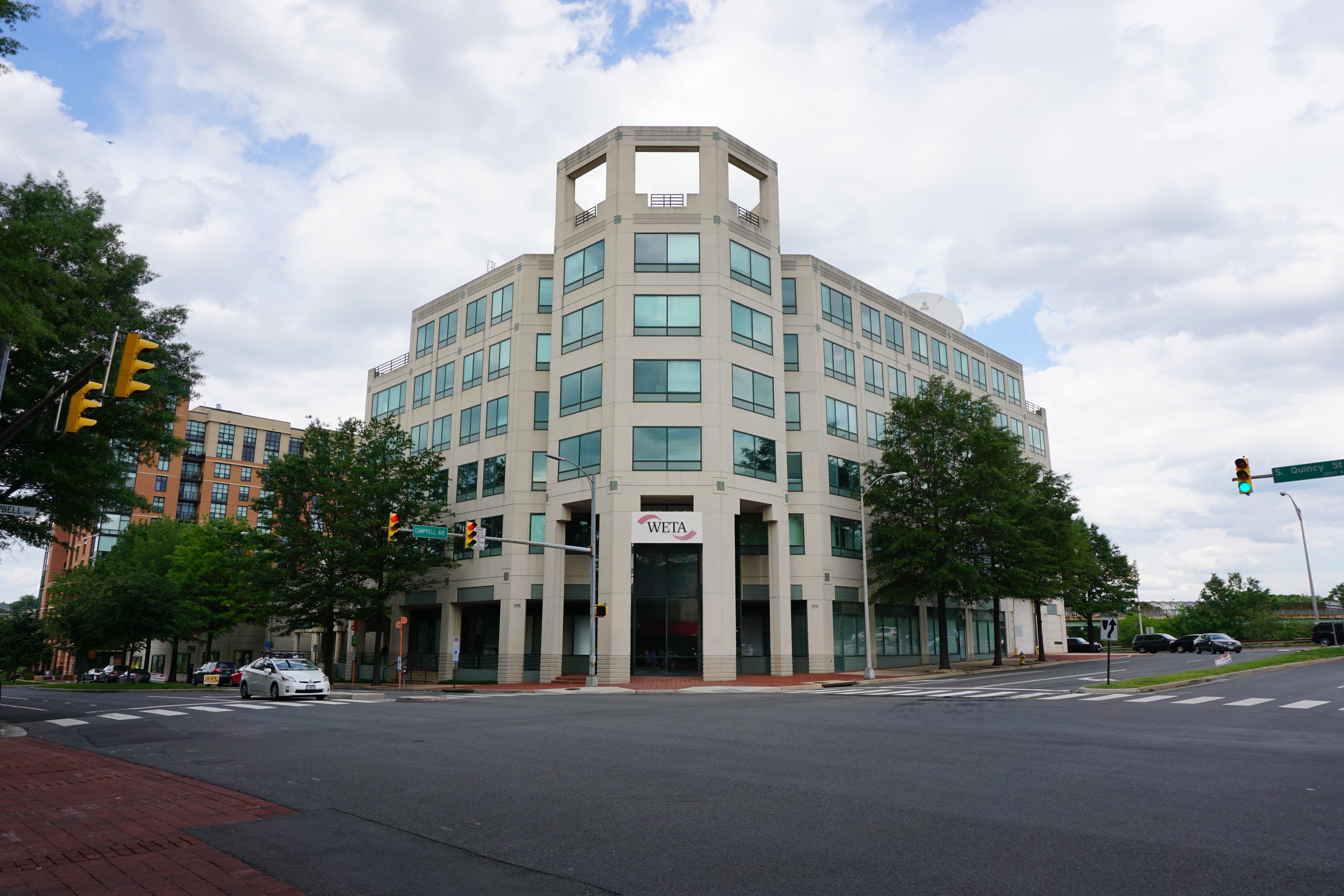
Shirlington locations (clockwise from upper left): Signature Theatre and Shirlington Library; Windsor Apartments complex; Campbell Avenue as viewed from South Arlington Mill Drive; and WETA FM's administrative offices.

Shirlington is an unincorporated urban area, officially called an "urban village", in the southern part of Arlington County, Virginia, United States, adjacent to the Fairlington area. The word "Shirlington" is a combination of "Shirley" (from the Shirley Highway or Interstate 395) and "Arlington".

Shirlington is billed as "Arlington’s Arts and Entertainment District" and is a largely mixed-use development based on New Urbanist principles. It is mostly middle-class residential, but like most of Arlington County has been experiencing an economic renaissance and is now home to many upscale dwellings and retail and service establishments that also serve the nearby Fairlington, Parkfairfax, Green Valley, and Long Branch Creek areas.

== Geography ==
Shirlington lies in the valley of Four Mile Run, a tributary of the Potomac River. The land rises toward Fairlington in the south and Green Valley in the north.

The area is bounded by I-395 on the east except for a small section of the Alexandria that lies to the west of the interstate. The only structure in that section, the Shirlington Gateway office building, has an Arlington address and is usually considered a part of Shirlington. To the north and west, starting in the east, Shirlington is bordered by South Glebe Road, 24th Street South, South Shirlington Road, South Four Mile Run Drive, and South Walter Reed Drive. On the west and south, starting in the west, Shirlington is bounded by South Arlington Mill Drive, the Arlington County Environmental Services facility, and the west side of Park Shirlington Apartments.

Most residential, commercial, and retail development lies south of Four Mile Run while the area to the northeast, which is sometimes considered part of neighboring Green Valley, is more light industrial.

== History ==
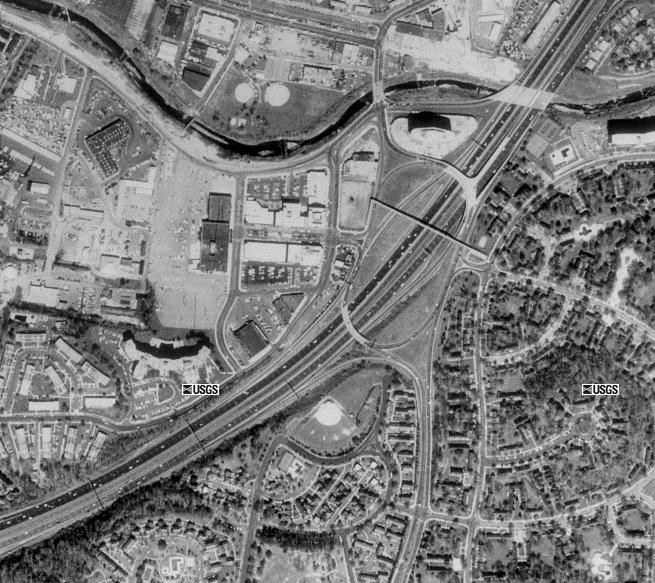
1988 aerial photo of Shirlington

Shirlington began when Joseph Cherner, automobile dealer and banker, established the Shirlington Corporation to build a shopping center for nearby Fairlington and Parkfairfax. He began with a 23 1/2-acre (9.5 ha) site on which the first store opened in June 1944. In 1959, the Lansburgh's department store opened a 150,000-square-foot (14,000 m^{2}), $2.5 million store, its second suburban branch. However, by the 1970s, Shirlington was an aging traditional shopping center facing competition from shopping malls.

In the 1980s, Shirlington was partially renovated to create a "traditional main street" along South 28th Street (now Campbell Avenue) with two office buildings at one end and a big box store and a cinema at the other. However, Shirlington remained small.

By 2000, Arlington County authorities, who had previously concentrated on development of areas adjacent to Washington Metro rail lines, began giving more attention to areas not served by Metro, such as the Columbia Pike corridor and Shirlington. The property's owner and the county spurred the creation of a Shirlington Phased Development Site Plan (PDSP) and the associated Shirlington Design Guidelines. A conceptual design for the area was established and almost 1,000,000 square feet (about 93,000 m^{2}) of new mixed-use development was envisioned. Emphasis was placed on making the area pedestrian friendly with automobile parking located behind the commercial buildings. This plan was approved by the Arlington County Board in 2001.

The development, a public-private partnership between developer Federal Realty Investment Trust of Rockville, Maryland (the operator of several other regional town-center-like developments such as Bethesda Row, Pentagon Row, and Rockville Town Center) and the county, began in the mid-2000s. As the plan was implemented, South 28th Street was extended westward and a building to house both the Signature Theatre and the Shirlington Library was constructed. Several new residential and parking structures were added as well.

== Economy ==
Shirlington is home to WETA-TV where nationally-broadcast programs such as PBS Newshour and Washington Week are filmed. WETA-FM radio and some USPTO satellite offices are also located in the town. The non-profit Analytic Services (ANSER) and the Association for Unmanned Vehicle Systems International are headquartered there. The design firm HNTB Corporation has major offices in Shirlington as well.

== Transportation ==
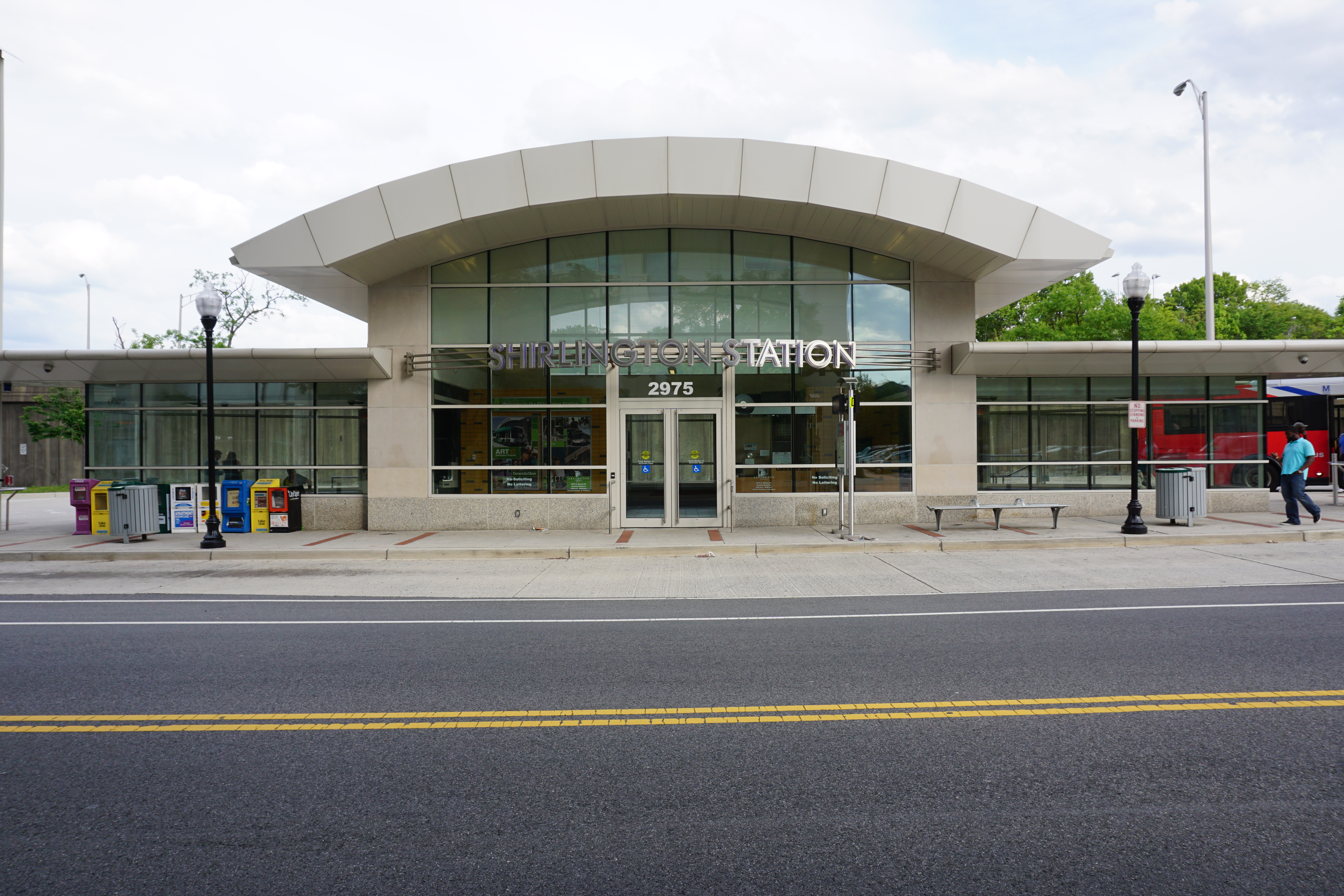
Shirlington Bus Station

Shirlington lies on Shirley Highway (I-395) for which the town is named and is accessible from Shirlington Circle (Exit 6 on I-395). The town is served by the Shirlington Bus Station, the only enclosed public bus station in Arlington and the principal transfer point for Metrobus and Arlington Transit (ART) bus service in South Arlington.

Shirlington is the site of the trailhead of the Washington & Old Dominion Railroad Regional Park rail trail that travels along the route of a railroad that closed in 1968, Shirlington Park, and Jennie Dean Park.

=== Shirlington Circle ===
Shirlington Circle or Shirlington Rotary (38°50′26″N 77°5′6″W) is a roundabout interchange connecting I-395 (Shirley Highway) with several surface roads in Arlington County and Alexandria. Although the circle is named after Shirlington, roughly half of it is located in Alexandria. The circle resembles roundabout interchanges common in the United Kingdom and Ireland but rare in the US.

The circle includes multiple access points including ramps (slip roads) to and from I-395 (Exit 6) both north and southbound as well as a reversible direction ramp that provides access to and from the reversible high-occupancy vehicle (HOV) lanes that run in the center of I-395. Four surface streets intersect with the circle; going counterclockwise (in the direction of traffic) from the north, they are:

- Shirlington Road, which forms the border between Arlington County and Alexandria to the north of I-395. (The road, however, enters Arlington County just to the north of the interchange.)
- Campbell Avenue (formerly 28th Street South) in Arlington County.
- Quaker Lane (State Route 402), which forms the border between Arlington County and Alexandria to the south of I-395.
- Gunston Road in Alexandria.

Traffic generally follows roundabout rules, i.e., traffic inside the circle has the right-of-way and traffic entering the circle must yield. However, there are also traffic lights and stop signs regulating traffic flow and the I-395 off-ramps enter the circle from the interior of the circle, requiring a left merge into the traffic circle.

The current circle and traffic arrangement have existed since a 1969-1972 reconstruction of Shirley Highway which widened the previous circle to allow for access to the then-proposed the Four Mile Run Expressway.

A high-occupancy toll lanes (HOT lanes) project proposed for I-395 in the 2000s would have directed additional traffic onto the circle and required the addition of a new entrance and exit to the circle and six new traffic lights, but the Arlington County portion of the project was cancelled in 2011.

== Services ==
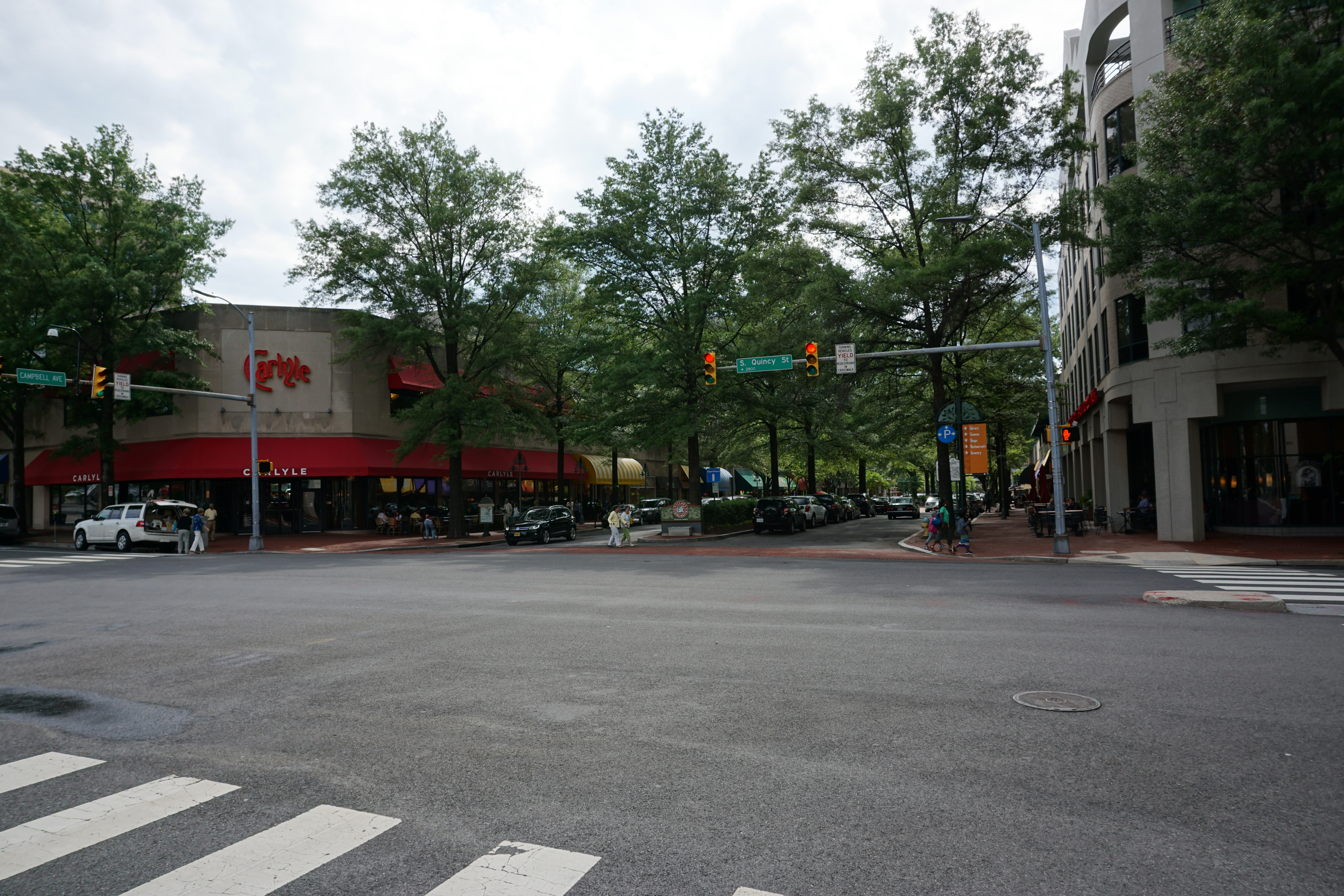
Restaurants along Campbell Avenue in 2014

=== Shopping ===
The center of Shirlington is occupied by the extensive Village at Shirlington retail, service, and residential complex which includes a series of buildings along Campbell Avenue (formerly South 28th Street). It was originally opened in 1944, as Shirlington Shopping Center, one of the earliest suburban shopping centers in the United States, and today provides most of the town's retail shopping. There are numerous restaurants, saloons, a Harris Teeter grocery store, a public library, a full service station that has been there since the 1940s, and a theater in the complex.

=== Entertainment ===
Shirlington is home to the Signature Theatre, a Tony-Award-winning regional theater company, Theatre on the Run, and the AMC Loews Shirlington 7 cinema. Public events and festivals include Wags and Whiskers (dog and cat festival) in August, Celtic Festival in September, Oktoberfest in October and Shir-la-la live music and wine tasting on summer Thursdays.

=== Library ===
Shirlington has been the site of a public library for over 60 years. The first library was called Fairlington Library after the nearby development of Fairlington which predated Shirlington and was opened in 1947 in the Shirlington Trust Building at 2780 South Randolph Street. The library expanded twice in the 1950s until moving to a location purpose-built for Shirlington Library at 2700 South Arlington Mill Drive in the early 1960s.

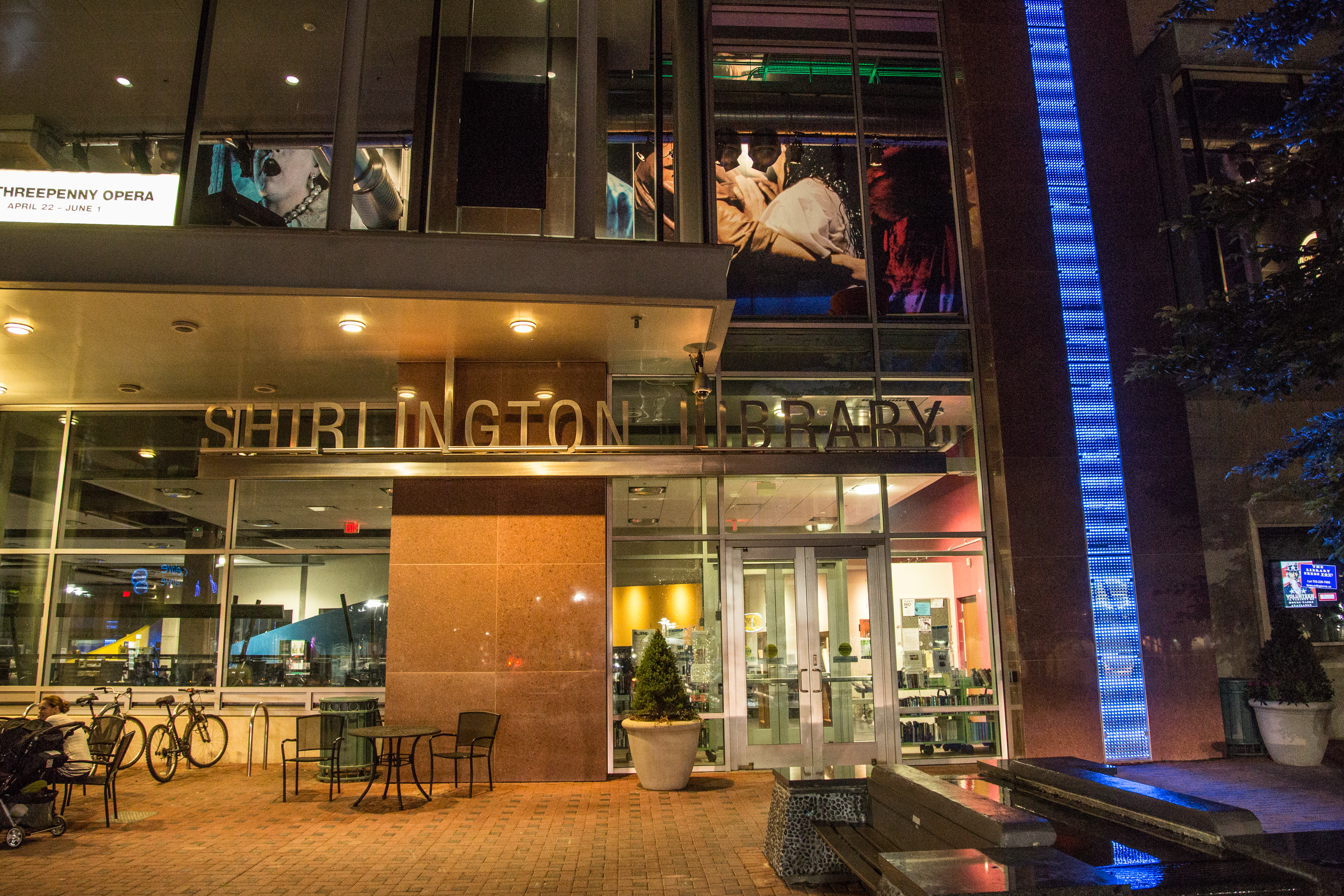

Plans for a new location for the library were approved in late 2000. In 2001, the Arlington Mill Drive location was razed and the Shirlington Library moved to a temporary location in the lower section of the Village at Shirlington shopping center fronting on Arlington Mill Drive (2786 South Arlington Mill Drive). This location housed the library until a flood in the restaurant above it caused the library to close in November 2006. The current Library, a 15,000-square-foot (1,400 m^{2}) facility at 2800 South Stafford Street (since changed to 4200 Campbell Ave) underneath the Signature Theater, which was under construction from August 2005 opened in March 2007. The Shirlington Library is a branch of Arlington Public Library.

== See also ==
- Shook's Hill interchange on the Queen Elizabeth Way in Ontario, an interchange similar to Shirlington Circle
