= Colonial Village (Arlington, Virginia) =

Historic apartments in Virginia, US

- Neighborhood
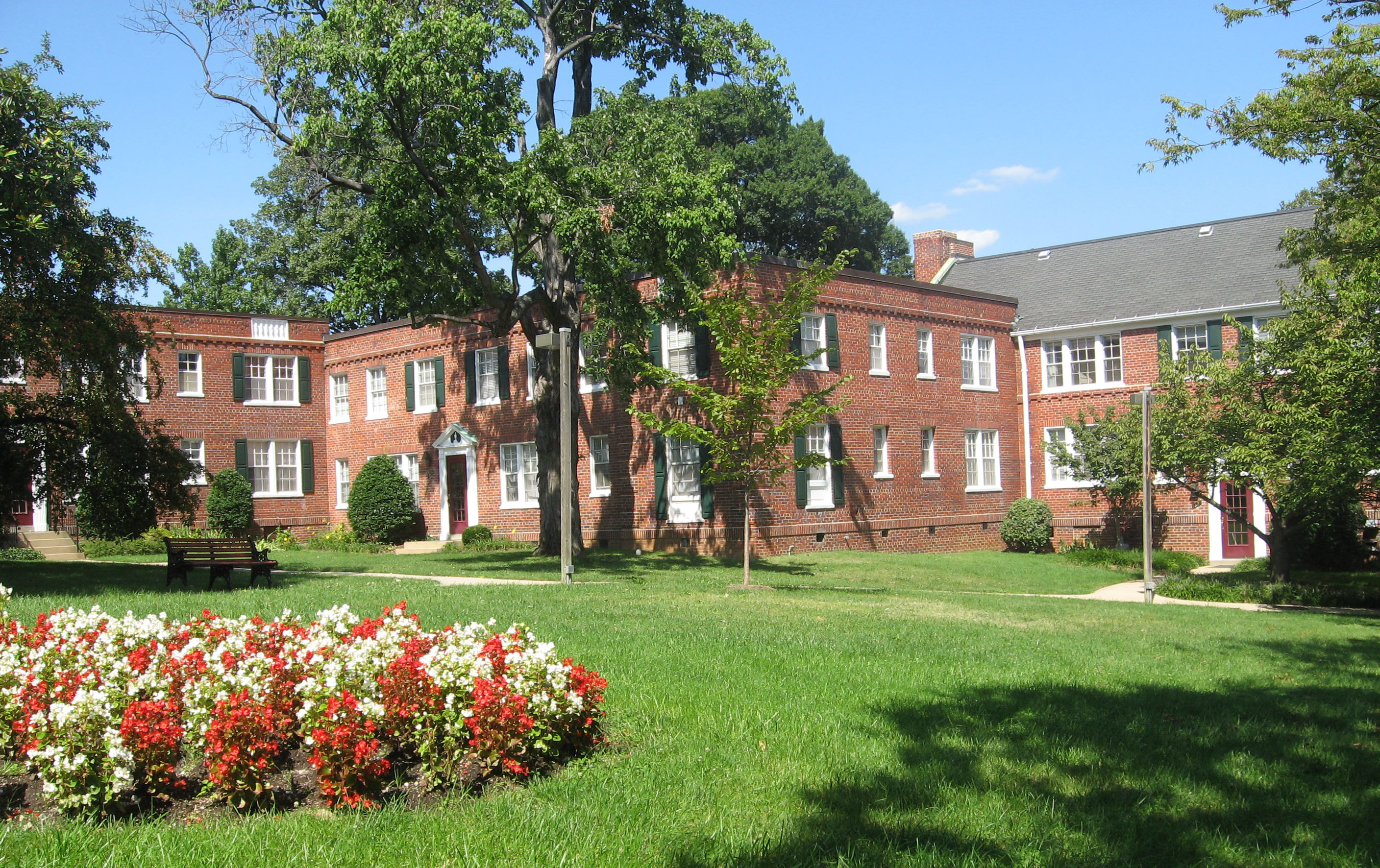
- Apartments and landscaped lawn
- Interactive map of Colonial Village
- Country: United States of America
- State: Virginia
- County: Arlington
- Time zone: UTC-5 (EST)
  - Summer (DST): UTC-4 (EDT)
- ZIP Codes: 22201
- Area code: 703
- Colonial Village
- U.S. Historic district
- Virginia Landmarks Register
- Location: Roughly bounded by Wilson Boulevard, Lee Hwy., N. Veitch St. and Queens Lane, Arlington, Virginia
- Coordinates: 38°53′39″N 77°4′59″W
- Area: 40 acres (16 ha)
- Built: 1935-1940
- Architect: Warwick, Harvey; Koenig, Francis
- Architectural style: Colonial Revival
- MPS: Garden Apartments, Apartment Houses and Apartment Complexes in Arlington County, Virginia MPS
- NRHP reference No.: 8000417
- VLR No.: 000-0013

Significant dates
- Added to NRHP: December 9, 1980
- Designated VLR: September 16, 1980

Colonial Village is a historic garden apartment complex and neighborhood located in Arlington County, Virginia, United States. Built in the Colonial Revival style with garden city design principles, it was constructed in four stages between 1935 and 1940 during the Great Depression and New Deal era. The complex contains a total of 245 buildings arranged around landscaped courtyards with approximately 1,055 apartments. Colonial Village was the first large-scale affordable housing project that was insured by the Federal Housing Administration (FHA). Its popularity resulted in it becoming a model community for the FHA that inspired numerous other developments in the Washington metropolitan area and around the United States.

Colonial Village was added to the National Register for Historic Places on December 9, 1980 in recognition of its significance in the early history of the FHA and evolution of garden apartment properties. Today, it has been partially converted to condos and co-ops, with remaining rental units designated as either market rate or affordable housing.

== History ==
=== Planning and construction ===
Colonial Village was initially conceived as a multi-family rental property in the early 1930s by Gustave Ring, a local real estate developer. After purchasing 50-acres of land on a former golf course in Arlington, Ring unsuccessfully petitioned local lenders to provide financial backing for the project, who were hesitant given the ongoing Great Depression. He first engaged with the FHA in 1935 while applying to get support for Colonial Village under Title II of the 1934 National Housing Act (NHA); this application was ultimately rejected. FHA staff advised Ring to adjust Colonial Village's specifications to qualify for FHA backing under the NHA Section 207. This proved successful, and the FHA accepted Colonial Village's application on February 15, 1935. FHA officials collaborated closely with Ring to ensure that the project's architecture and layout aligned with their standards, as they planned to use Colonial Village as a prototype for future FHA-insured developments.

As FHA-insured housing built during the Jim Crow era, Ring arranged Colonial Village as a racially segregated community only available to white renters. This was achieved through racially restrictive covenants that prevented African Americans and other minorities from becoming tenants, which were included as a part of Ring's FHA application materials for Colonial Village. Ring had incorporated similar discriminatory policies into his other Washington area developments. Those he instituted for Colonial Village were adopted in other FHA-insured apartment projects following its completion, and therefore impacted the early trajectory of these practices within FHA housing policy.

Aerial shot of Colonial Village, 1940

Construction began on April 8, 1935 after financing was secured through the New York Life Insurance Company. The superblock complex was completed in 4 phases between 1935 and 1940, the first 3 of which were insured by the FHA. Harvey Warwick, an architect who worked with Ring on The Westchester apartment building in the Cathedral Heights neighborhood of Washington, D.C., designed the FHA-insured phases. The final section, which Ring personally contracted under his own firm to control cost, was designed by Frank Koenig.

=== Reception and impact ===
Colonial Village was popular with prospective renters; around 15,000 rental applications were submitted before the first phase was completed in October 1935. Its success was soon recognized by the press, with Architectural Forum calling it the "most talked about project in the country" in August 1939. Colonial Village convinced investors like the New York Life Insurance Company that real estate development could be financially viable despite the Depression-era economy, and went on to become a widely promoted model for similar FHA projects and garden apartment developments across the United States. It also influenced other complexes of similar scale in the Washington metropolitan area, including Buckingham and Fairlington in Arlington County. Ring himself built several other FHA-insured rental housing projects in the region, such as Arlington Village in 1939.

=== Anti-discrimination lawsuits and historic site designation ===
In 1973, Ring was sued by the United States Department of Justice for allegedly refusing to accept tenants of Asian background in Colonial Village, with the intention of maintaining its "virtually all-white character". The lawsuit was ultimately settled via consent decree, which required that Ring not practice racial discrimination when considering potential tenants.

Ring maintained ownership over Colonial Village until October 1977, when it was sold to Mobil Land Development, a subsidiary of Mobil Oil Corporation. The anticipated arrival of the Washington Metro Orange Line in 1979 and high demand for rental housing had increased the property value substantially, and residents feared that Mobil would redevelop the community into more expensive high-rise units. Tenant groups organized in opposition of redevelopment, and after a hearing with the County Board, Colonial Village was designated as a local historic landmark on December 6, 1978, preventing Mobil from changing building exteriors without a special permit. By 1980, Colonial Village was added to the National Register of Historic Places.

In 1987, Mobil was sued by local fair housing councils and a Georgetown University professor for alleged racial bias in their advertising of Colonial Village, which only featured white models up to May 1986. Mobil eventually settled the case in 1995 and agreed to include models reflective of all races in the area in future advertising.

=== Further developments ===
By the late 1980s, many of Colonial Village's apartments were converted into condos and co-ops, separating part of the development from remaining market-rate rental units. Wesley Development Corporation, an affordable housing non-profit, purchased the rental units from Mobil in 1992. Welsey eventually renovated their units and converted them into low-income housing in 2012.

== Architecture ==
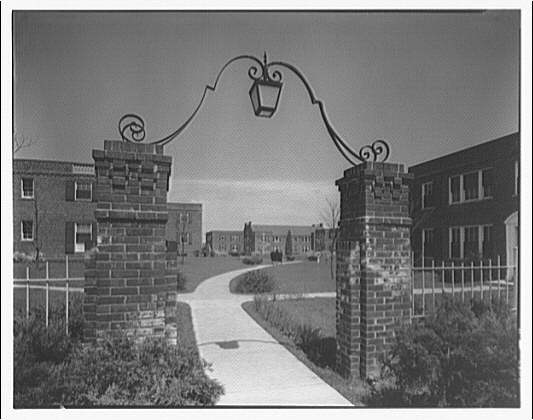
View through an arch into a courtyard, by Theodor Horydczak, ca. 1940 - 1950

Colonial Village was built in 4 separate phases between 1935 and 1940 by architects Harvey Warwick and Frank Koenig. Its forested areas and low-density, with buildings only occupying 18 percent of the land, reflect garden city concepts that were popular in the early 20th century. As its name implies, it was designed in the Colonial Revival style, which was favored by the FHA due to its popularity. The complex consists of 245 two to three story buildings spread over 50 acres. Buildings are organized in clusters that surround courtyards and are connected through a network of pathways. Landscaping, which includes native trees, shrubs, and public lawns, has been attributed to James K Wright.

Colonial Village's apartment buildings are of a brick and block construction with concrete foundations. Buildings exteriors are finished in 6-course American bond red bricks with wood millwork details. Each building contains four to ten apartment units that range from studios to 2-bedrooms. The interiors have plaster walls, wood millwork, and parquet and linoleum flooring.

== Geography ==
Colonial Village is located on a hillside and is bounded by Wilson Boulevard, Langston Boulevard, North Veitch Street and Queens Lane. It is bordered by the neighborhoods of Lyon Village, Court House, Radnor/Fort Myer Heights, and Rosslyn.

== Infrastructure ==
Colonial Village is adjacent to Langston Boulevard, with is a component highway of U.S. Route 29, and Interstate 66. Wilson Boulevard runs to the south of the neighborhood. Bike lanes running through Clarendon and Rosslyn pass Colonial Village along Wilson Boulevard. The Custis Trail, a shared-use path, is accessible through N Veitch Street.

=== Public transit ===
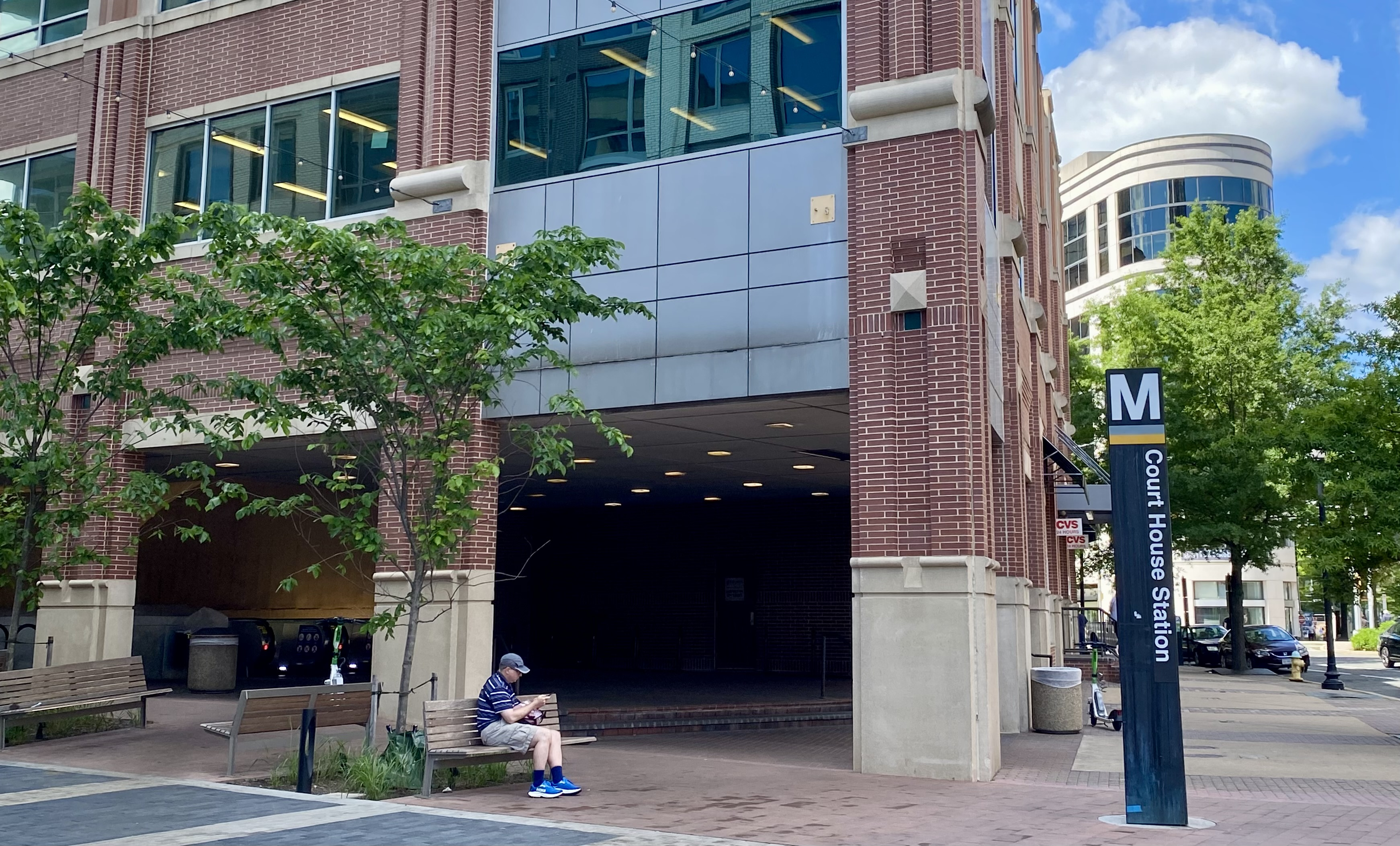
Main entrance to Court House metro station

4 Capital Bikeshare stations are located near Colonial Village on Wilson Boulevard and N Veitch Street. The Court House Metro station along the Orange and Silver Metrorail lines is in the nearby Court House neighborhood, as well as the following Metrobus and Arlington Transit bus routes:

- Metrobus F62: Pershing Drive-Arlington Boulevard
- Metrobus A58: Ballston-Farragut Square
- ART 41: Columbia Pike-Ballston-Courthouse
- ART 43: Courthouse-Rosslyn-Crystal City
- ART 45: Columbia Pike-DHS/Sequoia-Rosslyn
- ART 61: Rosslyn-Court House Metro Shuttle

== See also ==
- List of Arlington County Historic Districts

== Bibliography ==
- Trieschmann, Laura; Schoenfeld, Anrea (February 2, 2011). National Register of Historic Places Multiple Property Documentation Form: Garden Apartments, Apartment Houses and Apartment Complexes in Arlington County, Virginia: 1934-1954 (PDF). National Park Service.
- National Register of Historic Places (May 1980). National Register of Historic Places Inventory Nomination Form - Colonial Village (PDF). National Park Service.
