= Court House, Arlington County, Virginia =

Neighborhood in Virginia, US

- Neighborhood
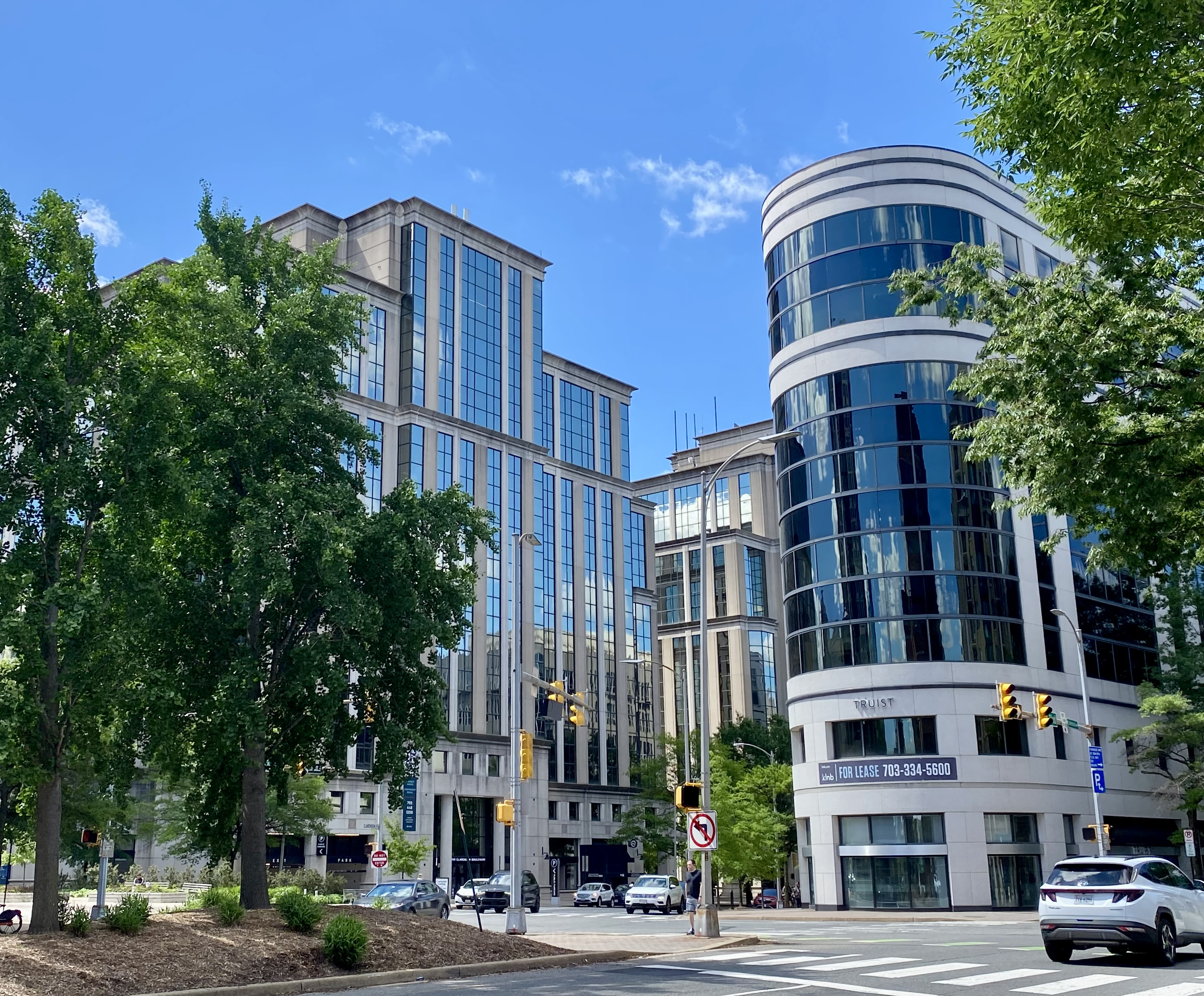
- Intersection of N Veitch St, Clarendon Blvd, and Wilson Blvd
- Interactive map of Court House, Arlington County, Virginia
- Coordinates: 38°53′15″N 77°05′21″W
- Country: United States
- State: Virginia
- County: Arlington
- ZIP Code: 22201
- Area code: 703

Court House, also known as Courthouse, is a neighborhood in northern Arlington County, Virginia that serves as Arlington's seat of government. It is generally bounded by Arlington Boulevard, N Rhodes Street, Courthouse Road, Key Boulevard, and N Danville Street, and is located along an urban corridor that follows the Orange and Silver Metro lines.

The site of Fort Woodbury during the Civil War, Court House began in the late 19th century as a small community that surrounded Arlington County's first courthouse built outside of Alexandria, Virginia. Population growth in Arlington in the first half of the 20th century prompted greater residential and commercial development, which was further spurred by the opening of the Court House Metro station in 1979. Court House, like other neighborhoods in the Rosslyn-Ballston corridor, has since become mixed-use and transit-oriented.

== History ==
During the colonial era, Thomas Fairfax, 6th Lord Fairfax of Cameron sold 705 acres of land that includes present-day Court House to George Mason on September 7, 1767. The area remained undeveloped until the Civil War, when it was selected as the site of Fort Woodbury. The lunette-type fortification, designed by Major D. P. Woodbury in 1861, was positioned on top of a hill and formed part of the Arlington Line of defenses protecting Washington, D.C. from Confederate incursions.

=== First courthouse and early development ===
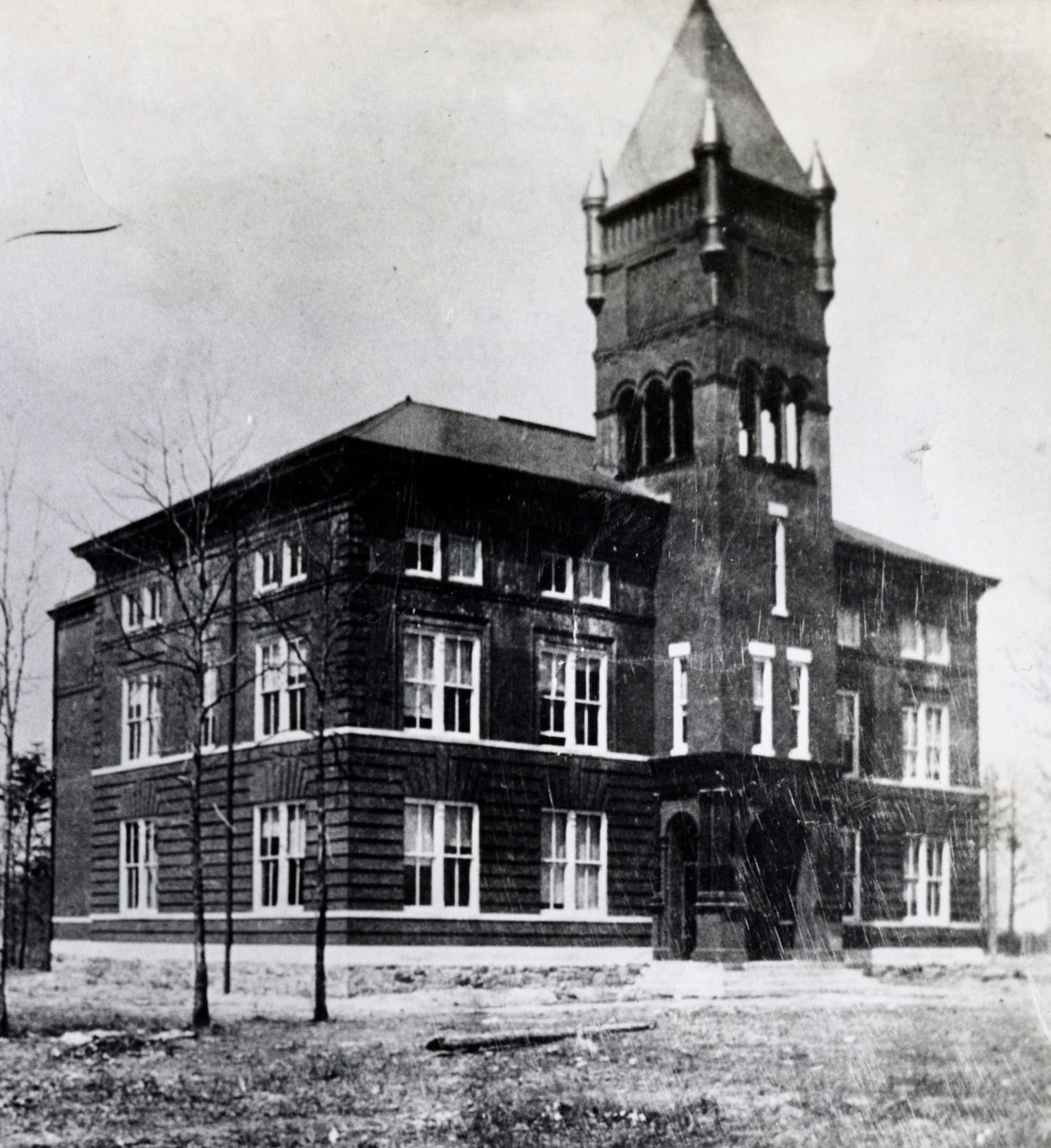
1898 courthouse shortly after construction, courtesy of Charlie Clark Center for Local History, Arlington Public Library

While Alexandria County, as Arlington County was then known, had legally separated from the City of Alexandria in 1870, the County's courthouse continued to be located in Alexandria. In 1896, the Virginia General Assembly passed legislation enabling residents of Alexandria County to vote whether the courthouse should remain in Alexandria or be moved to an alternative location within the County. On May 28, 1896, voters chose the former site of Fort Woodbury, which was by then within the recently platted Fort Myer Heights subdivision.

The new County courthouse, a 3-story red brick structure in the Richardsonian Romanesque style that included a jail nearby, was completed by November 1898. It was designed by local architect Albert Goenner, an immigrant from Germany who had designed numerous buildings in the Washington metropolitan area, including the Concordia Church in Foggy Bottom, the Arlington Brewery in Rosslyn, and the Reserve Hill estate. Virginia Governor James Hoge Tyler spoke at the opening ceremony.

The land surrounding the courthouse remained unoccupied until local lawyers began establishing offices across the street during the 1920s and 1930s. This collection of buildings became known as Lawyer's Row. Arlington's population growth during the New Deal era and World War II resulted in further development, including office buildings and businesses. The Colonial Village garden apartment complex, the country's first FHA-insured housing project, was constructed in the neighborhood between 1935 and 1940. Lee Gardens North, another garden apartment property designed by prominent Armenian American architect Mihran Mesrobian, was built south of the courthouse in 1950. Both are listed on the National Register for Historic Places.

=== Second courthouse and arrival of Metro ===
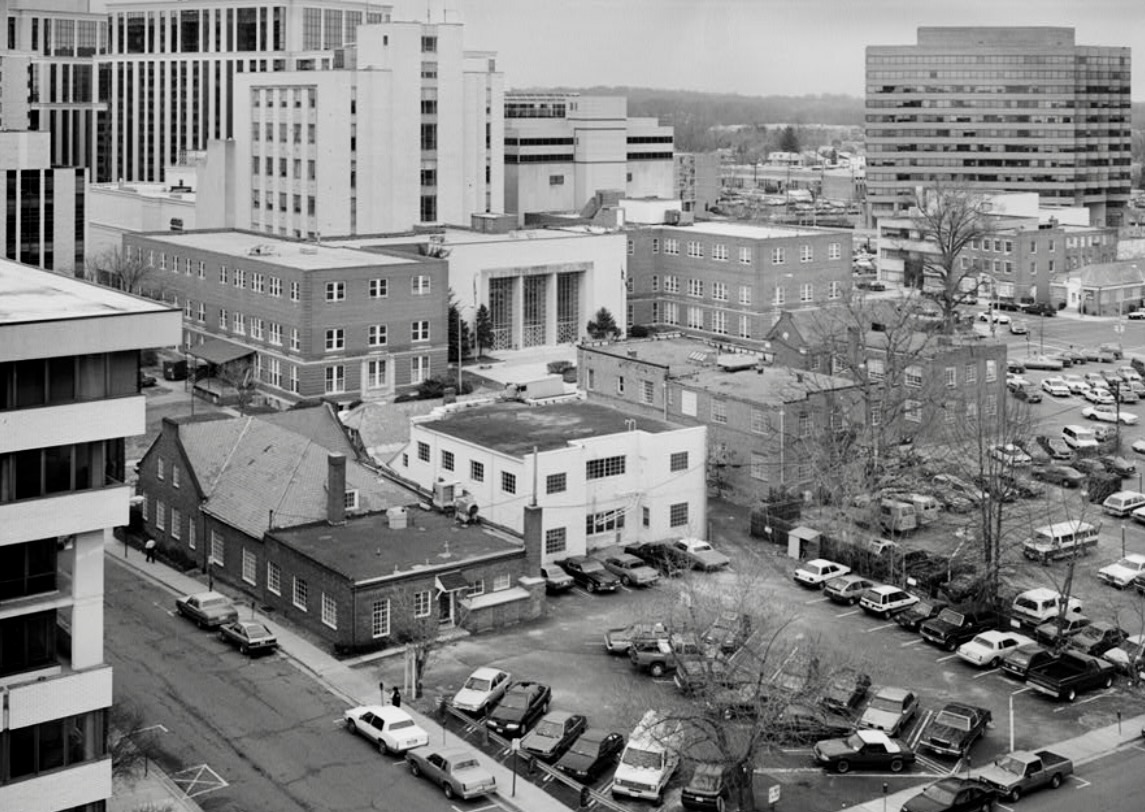
1961 courthouse with earlier wings and Lawyer's Row before demolition, early 1990s

The 1898 courthouse had acquired two additional wings in 1950 to accommodate the County's growing needs, and in June 1956 voters approved for more improvements to the structure. The original building was demolished in 1960 to make way for a new 7-story courthouse that was dedicated the following year. In 1967, the new courthouse was the site of the trial for the murder of George Lincoln Rockwell, founder of the Arlington-based American Nazi Party.

The completion of Court House station on the new Washington Metro Orange Line on December 1, 1979 resulted in more development. This included Courthouse Plaza, a large apartment, retail, and office complex built in 1988 on a former parking lot. As a Metro stop on the Rosslyn-Ballston, Virginia corridor, Arlington County officials sought to encourage greater mixed-use urbanization of Court House within walking distance of the station. Former single family properties were replaced with condo buildings, apartments, and townhomes.

=== Third courthouse and continued development ===
The site of Lawyer's Row was being considered for a new courthouse building by 1989. After a fire in the courthouse building in May 1990, Arlington residents voted for it to be demolished and replaced. A new 13-story complex was completed in 1995, and the 1961 courthouse was razed in 1997. The trial table from the original 1898 courthouse is preserved in one of the new courthouse's trial rooms.

New construction in the neighborhood has persisted, including high-rise apartment buildings such as The Commodore, which replaced the commercial structures on Landmark Block, and The Wendy. According to the neighborhood's sector plan, County planners intend on eventually redeveloping the parking lot opposite the present courthouse, which was the site of the County's original courthouse buildings, into a public square.

== Geography ==
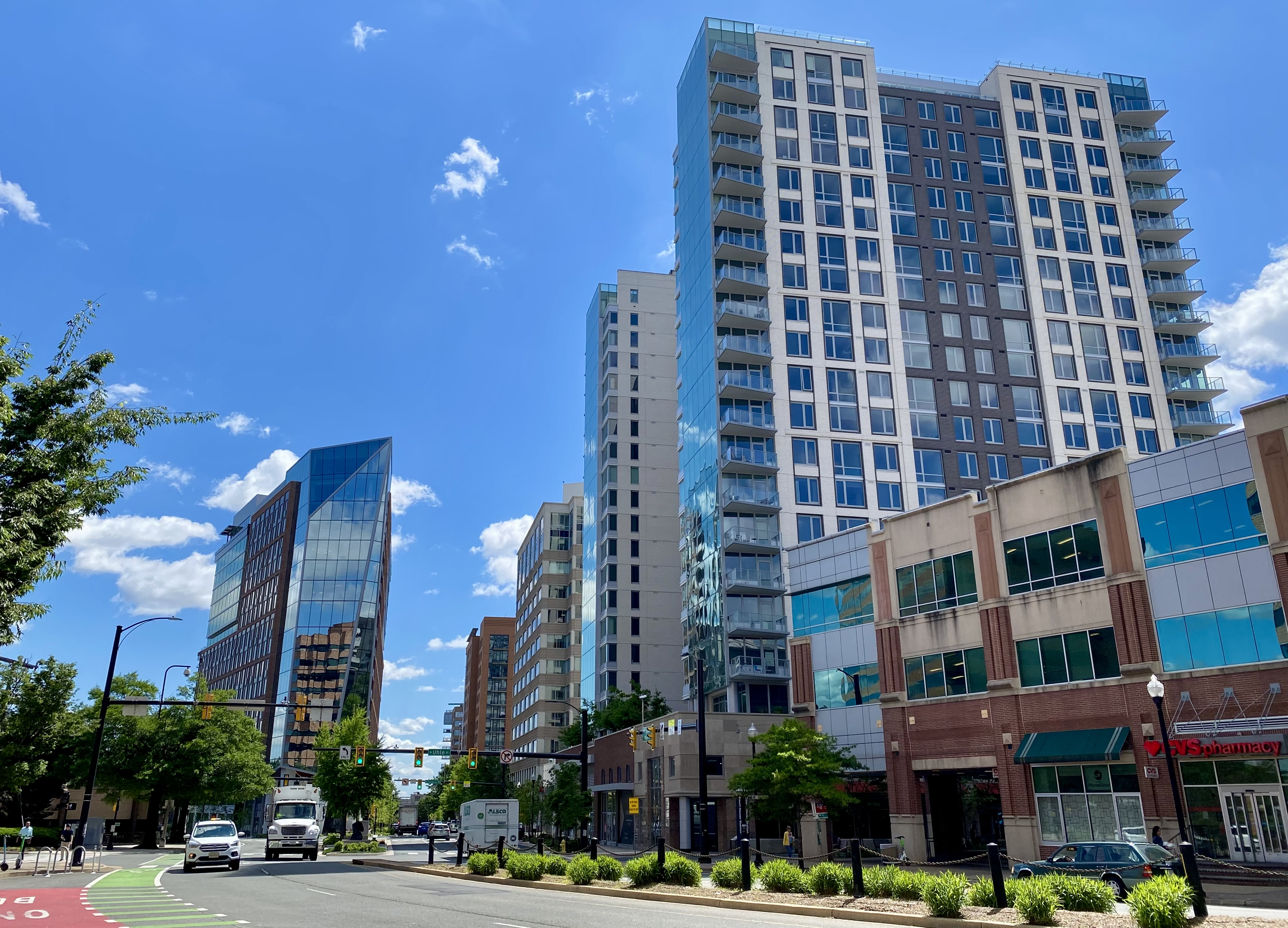
Looking down Clarendon Blvd

As with many communities in Arlington, the exact boundaries of the Court House neighborhood are unclear. Arlington County's Court House Sector Plan includes the area roughly bounded by Arlington Boulevard, N Rhodes Street, Courthouse Road, Key Boulevard, and N Danville Street. The Clarendon-Courthouse Civic Association defines boundaries that overlap with the Clarendon neighborhood to the west.

Court House is situated on a hill, and is surrounded by the following neighborhoods:

- Colonial Village
- Radnor/Fort Myer Heights
- Lyon Village
- Clarendon
- Lyon Park

== Economy ==
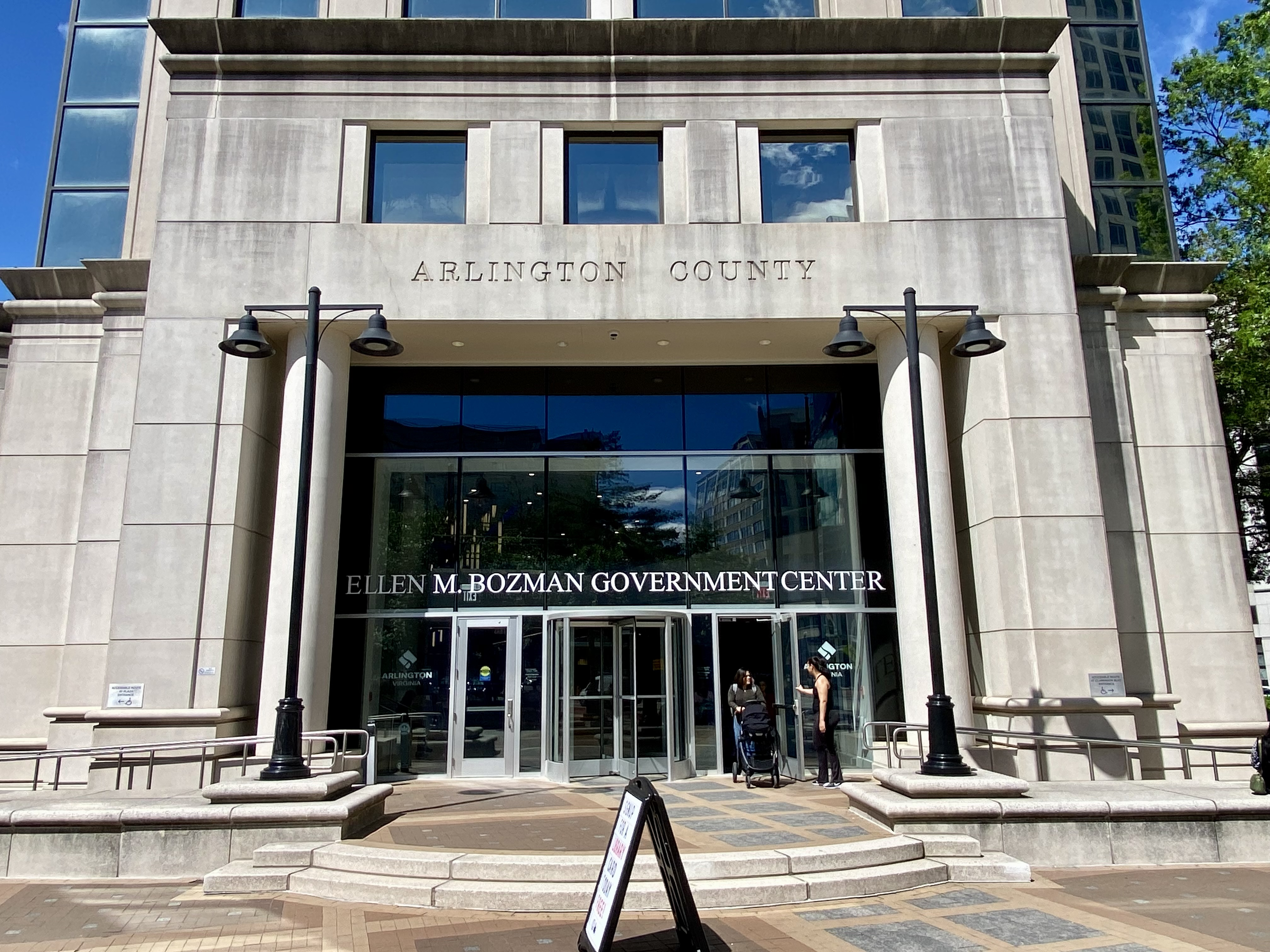
Ellen M. Bozman Government Center

Court House is the seat of the Arlington County government, and hosts many of its administrative offices in the Ellen M. Bozman Government Center. It is the location of large residential and offices buildings, as well as restaurants, bars, and other retail that serves the local community. The neighborhood also has an AMC theater located in Courthouse Plaza.

== Infrastructure ==
Clarendon Boulevard and Wilson Boulevard run in parallel through the middle of the neighborhood. Arlington Boulevard, a component highway of the transcontinental U.S. Route 50 and a major arterial road, is located on Court House's southern boundary.

Bike lanes running through Clarendon and Rosslyn pass Court House along Clarendon and Wilson Boulevards. The Custis Trail, a shared-use path, is accessible through N Veitch Street. The Arlington Boulevard Trail that follows Route 50 is accessible via Courthouse Road.

=== Public transit ===
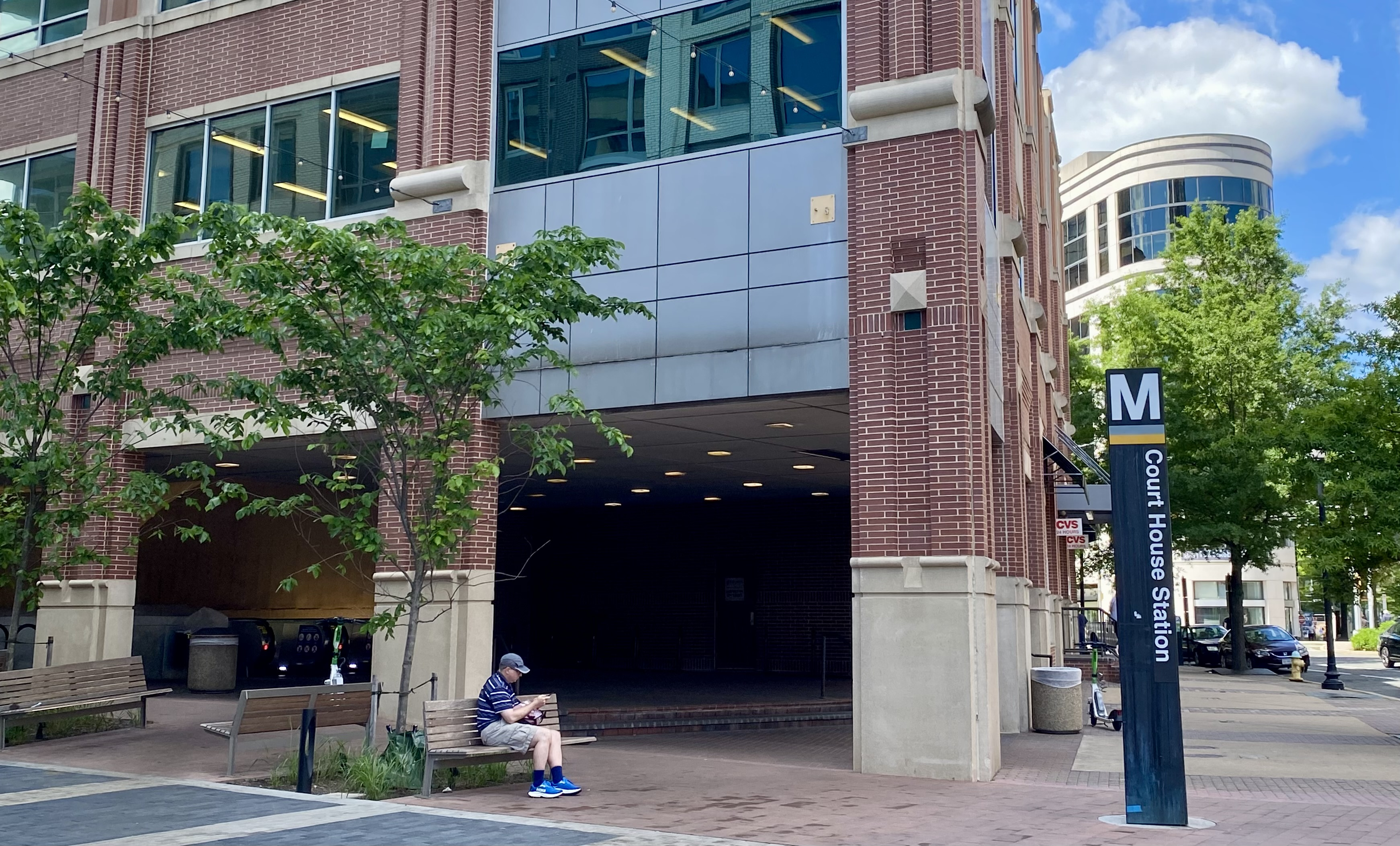
Main entrance to Court House metro station

Court House has several Capital Bikeshare stations on Wilson Boulevard, Clarendon Boulevard, N Veitch Street, and 15th Street. It is served by the Orange and Silver Metrorail lines, as well as the following Metrobus and Arlington Transit bus routes:

- Metrobus 4AB: Pershing Drive-Arlington Boulevard
- Metrobus 38B: Ballston-Farragut Square
- ART 41: Columbia Pike-Ballston-Courthouse
- ART 43: Courthouse-Rosslyn-Crystal City
- ART 45: Columbia Pike-DHS/Sequoia-Rosslyn
- ART 61: Rosslyn-Court House Metro Shuttle
- ART 62: Court House Metro-Lorcom Lane-Ballston Metro
- ART 77: Shirlington-Lyon Park-Courthouse

== Arts and culture ==
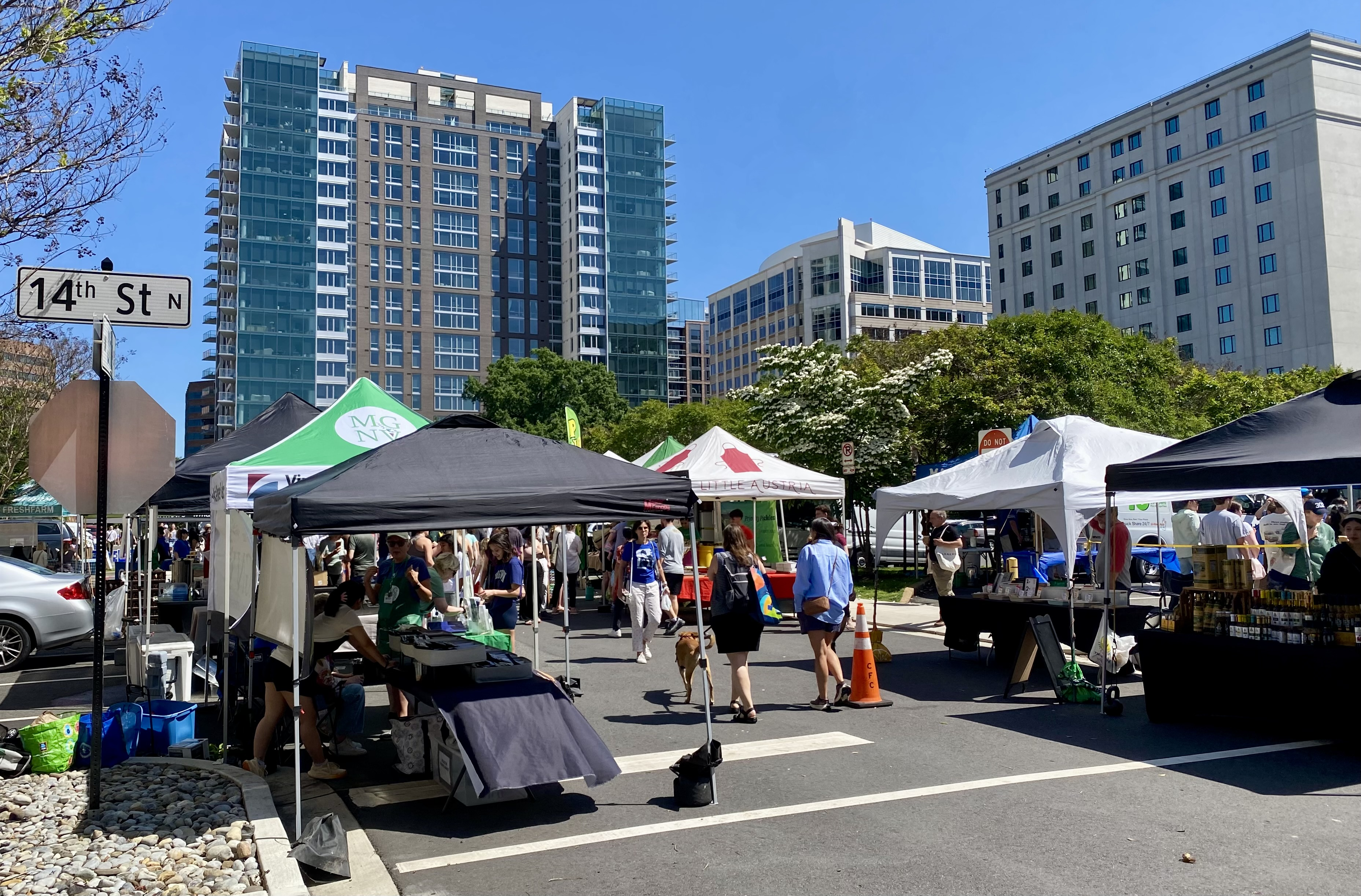
Arlington Farmer's Market

Every Saturday, the Arlington Farmer's Market and a flea market operate on N Uhle Street and 14th Street N, and 15th Street N, respectively. The Courthouse branch of the Arlington Public Library is located in the Ellen E. Bozman Government Center

== Parks and recreation ==
Court House has the following parks:

- Rocky Run Park
- Barton Park
- Clarendon-Barton Interim Open Space

Rocky Run Park has a playground, basketball courts, a field, and fitness equipment.

== Bibliography ==
- Dodge, George (October 2005). "Symbols of Justice from the Three Courthouses of Arlington" (PDF). Arlington Historical Magazine. 13 (1): 39–53.
- Rose, Jeanne (October 1979). "A History of the Arlington County Courthouse" (PDF). Arlington Historical Magazine. 6 (3): 32–41.
- Webb, Willard (October 2000). "Albert Goenner: The Forgotten Architect of Arlington's First Courthouse" (PDF). Arlington Historical Magazine. 11 (4): 30–38.
- County of Arlington, Virginia (September 21, 2015). Courthouse Sector Plan Addendum: Courthouse Square (PDF). Arlington County Department of Community Planning, Housing and Development, Planning Division.
