= Lyon Village, Virginia =

Neighborhood in Virginia, US

Lyon Village
- Neighborhood
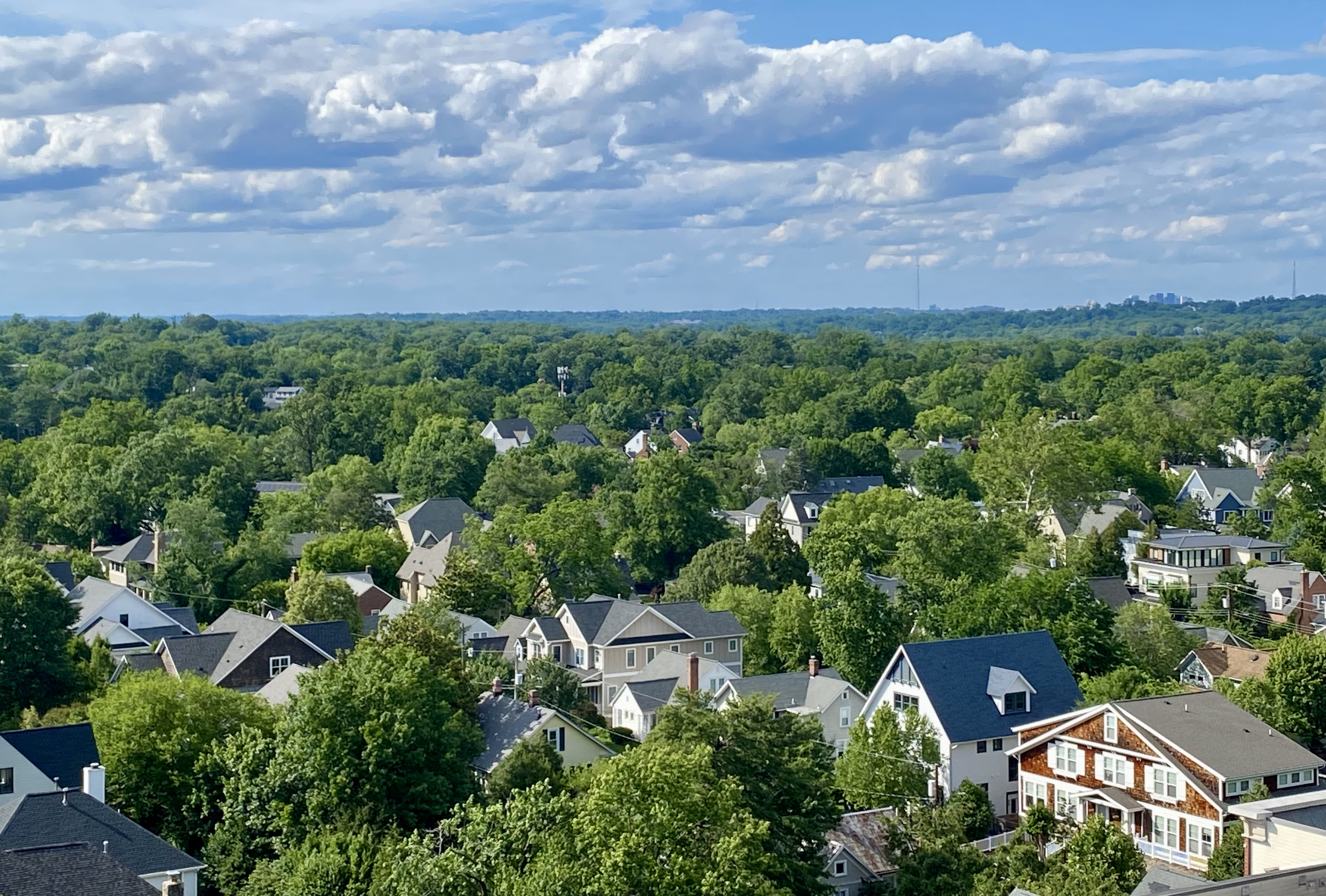
- Birdseye view of Lyon Village
- Interactive map of Lyon Village
- Country: United States of America
- State: Virginia
- County: Arlington
- Time zone: UTC-5 (EST)
  - Summer (DST): UTC-4 (EDT)
- ZIP Codes: 22201
- Area code: 703
- Lyon Village Historic District
- U.S. National Register of Historic Places
- U.S. Historic district
- Virginia Landmarks Register
- Location: Roughly bounded by Langston Blvd, N. Veitch St., N. Franklin Rd., N. Highland St., N. Fillmore St., and N. Kirkwood Rd., Arlington County, Virginia
- Coordinates: 38°53′29″N 77°5′42″W
- Area: 191 acres (77 ha)
- Built: 1846-1950
- Architect: Lyon, Frank; et al.
- Architectural style: Late Victorian, Late 19th And 20th Century Revivals, Art Deco, Other
- NRHP reference No.: 02000512
- VLR No.: 000-7822

Significant dates
- Added to NRHP: May 10, 2002
- Designated VLR: December 5, 2001

Lyon Village is a neighborhood in Arlington County, Virginia. It is roughly bounded by Langston Boulevard, North Veitch Street, North Franklin Road, North Highland Street, North Fillmore Street, and North Kirkwood Road, and is positioned next to the urbanized Rosslyn-Ballston corridor.

Lyon Village was established in 1923 after real estate developer Frank Lyon purchased farmland from the Cruit family directly north of the growing Clarendon community, which had been platted in 1900. It was built as a middle and upper-middle class suburb of nearby Washington, D.C., and was located along Virginia's interurban trolley lines. Lyon's real estate company, Lyon & Fitch, split the development into 9 sections that incorporated preexisting homes from the Clarendon and Aurora Heights subdivisions. The neighborhood was mostly complete by the early 1950s, and contains many examples of Colonial Revival, Craftsman, Spanish Mission Revival, Tudor Revival, and Classical Revival architecture. Lyon Village was listed on the National Register for Historic Places in 2002 as a well preserved community built during Arlington's early 20th century suburbanization. Despite its proximity to the higher-density Clarendon, Court House, and Virginia Square neighborhoods, it has generally retained its low-density character and landscaping.

== History ==
During the colonial era, present-day Lyon Village was part of the larger Northern Neck land grant. William Struttfield of Westmoreland County, Virginia purchased 500 acres of this property in 1709 from Thomas Fairfax, 5th Lord Fairfax of Cameron. The land passed through a series of owners during the 18th and 19th centuries, including George Mason and his son John. One of them, Robert Cruit, a butter merchant from Washington who bought the property from Robert and Mary Witticomb in July 1846, used it as a summer retreat and dairy farm. Cruit and his family ran the farm with enslaved labor between 1847 and the early Civil War. The Cruit's farmhouse, which still stands today on North Highland Street, was used as a hospital during the war for 6 months by the 3rd and 8th Pennsylvania Cavalry Regiments.

=== Planning and development ===
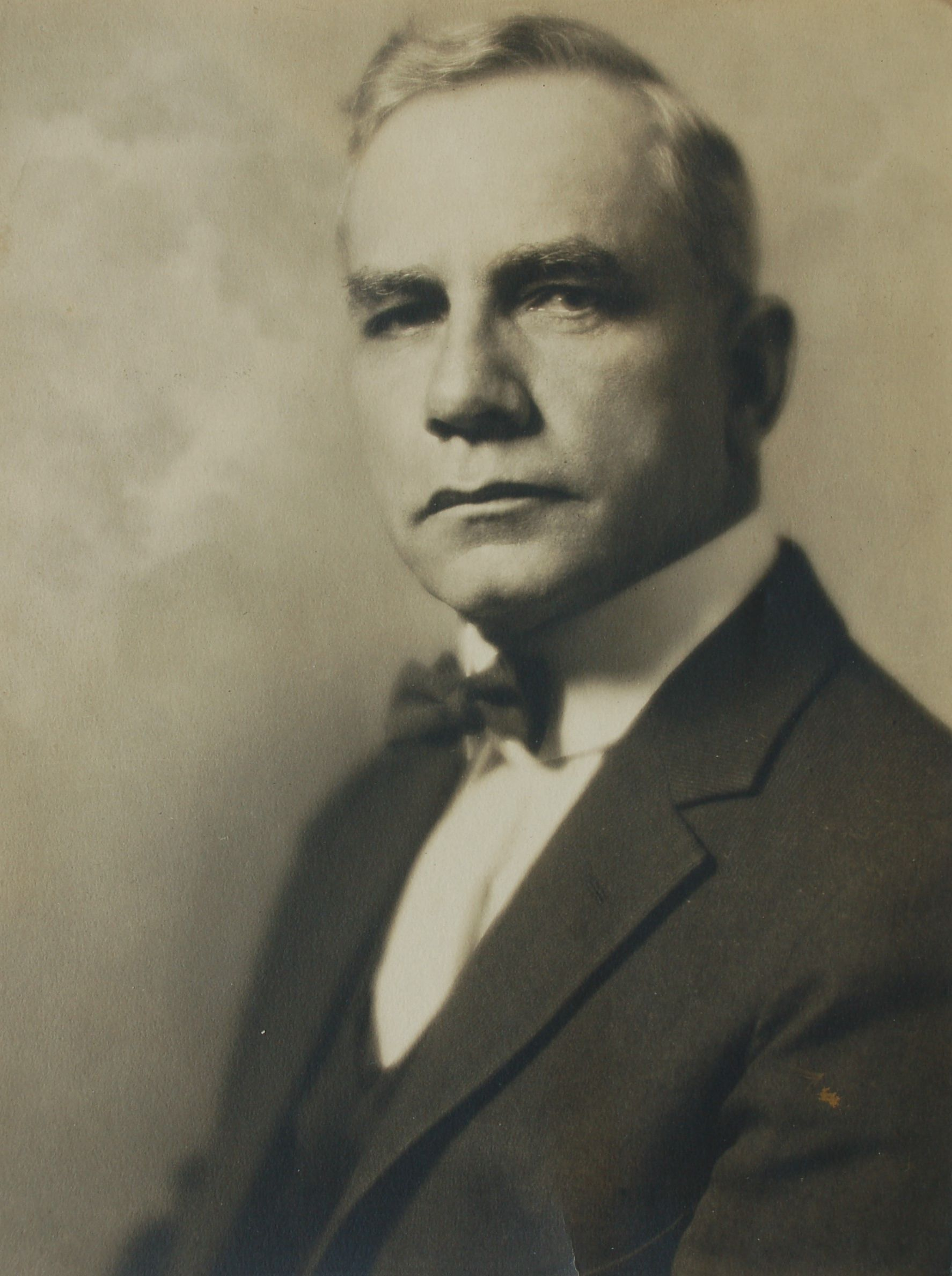
Portrait of Frank Lyon, developer of Lyon Village

The Cruit family maintained ownership over their farmland until 1912, when Robert Cruit's granddaughters began subdividing it for prospective residential development. Frank Lyon, a newspaper publisher and land developer from Petersburg, Virginia, purchased 165 acres of the Cruit's property in 1923 for $185,000, intending to develop it into his planned Lyon Village subdivision. Lyon had earlier developed neighboring Lyon Park in 1922. He and his partners envisioned Lyon Village as a more upper-middle class development informed by the tenants and aesthetics of the City Beautiful movement.

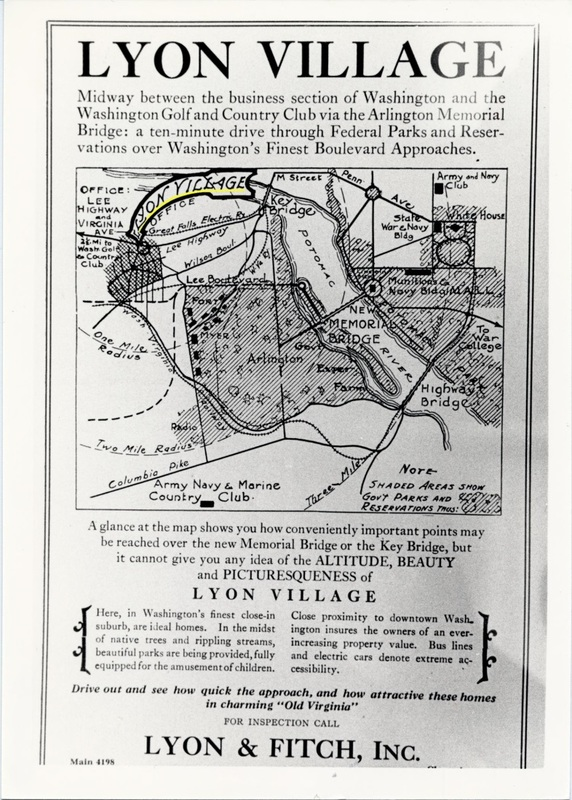
Ad of Lyon Village, c. 1923

Advertising for Lyon Village emphasized its proximity to planned infrastructure like the Arlington Memorial Bridge and easy commutes into Washington by car as well as trolley. This reflected the broader movement towards car-based transit and away from the trains and trolley lines that had served as the dominant forms of transportation in Arlington. Also highlighted in Lyon Village's promotional materials was its racial segregation that only permitted white buyers to purchase property. Racially restrictive covenants, which are known to have existed in Lyon Village and were common in Jim Crow era Arlington County, prevented African Americans and other minority groups from owning homes. This persisted until the passing of the Civil Rights Act of 1968, which officially abolished de jure housing segregation throughout the United States.

The first section of Lyon Village, which consisted of 148 acres of the original parcel, were platted for the neighborhood by Lyon & Fitch, Lyon's development company, in 1923. William F. Sunderland, who served as Lyon Village's landscape architect, divided the property into 9 sections. Parts of the adjacent Clarendon community, platted in 1900, and Aurora Heights, which was partially developed starting in 1906, were incorporated into Lyon Village. Most of the lots were sold during the 1920s, with demand driven by the growth in the Federal workforce. Around 134 buildings were completed to the east of North Highland Street by 1929, and the old Aurora Heights section contained over 135 buildings, including stores and a school. Development slowed during the Great Depression, but increased again after the economic recovery. By 1950, Lyon Village was mostly developed with over 800 buildings. Further additions and lots continued to be built into the mid-1960s.

Provisions promised by Lyon's firm to Lyon Village residents included a trust fund retaining 10% of the purchase price of each lot, which was used for regular maintenance of neighborhood infrastructure. This was to be kept under Lyon's firm until 75% of the lots were sold. The Lyon Village Citizens Association, a neighborhood association established in 1926, sought to claim this fund for the construction of a community center, a public park, and other amenities in 1940. Lyon Incorporated, renamed after Frank Lyon's partner C. Walton Fitch left the firm, refused to provide the funds. The Association sued Lyon and ultimately prevailed at the Supreme Court of Virginia, reaching an agreement in October 1944 that Lyon would provide $20,000 and 8 lots for the community center and park facilities. The community house, a 1-story Colonial Revival building completed in December 1949, was designed by Lyon Village resident Eimer Cappelmann.

=== Recent history ===
Lyon Village was added to the Virginia Landmarks Register on December 5, 2001, and the National Register of Historic Places on May 10, 2002. At the time of designation, non-contributing properties included infill development from the 1990s. Lyon Village's historic designations do not mandate architectural restrictions, which has enabled property owners to substantially renovate or demolish historic homes.

While currently under single-family zoning, Lyon Village has faced development pressures given its proximity to Clarendon, which has urbanized since the 2000s, and the Orange and Silver lines. This has in part taken the form of affordable housing projects pursued by its religious communities, including the First Baptist Church, which demolished most of their sanctuary to construct a 10-story low-income apartment building in 2011. The Clarendon Presbyterian Church on North Jackson Street tried to implement a similar 6-story affordable housing project for LGBTQ community seniors in the early 2020s. This was challenged by neighborhood groups as undermining Lyon Village's character, infrastructure, and the county's General Land Use Plan. The church later canceled the project, citing rising construction costs resulting from the Trump Administration's tariff policies. These developments have occurred during a County-wide controversy over missing middle housing policies pursued by the County Board.

== Architecture ==
=== 19th through early 20th centuries ===
Within its boundaries, Lyon Village contains buildings that were constructed before its platting in 1923. The oldest of these is the Cruit farmhouse on North Highland Street, a wood-frame home Robert Cruit built in 1846 as a summer retreat. It has been extensively modified since the Cruit family's ownership, including renovations by Frank Lyon that added the current gabled portico with Classical columns, and later modifications that encased the exterior in vinyl siding. Other pre-1923 buildings include dwellings built as a part of the earlier Clarendon and Aurora Heights communities. These structures, which range from the 1880s to the 1920s, are built in the Queen Anne and Craftsman styles with varying levels of ornamentation; those of the latter style exhibit bungalow and American Foursquare layouts.

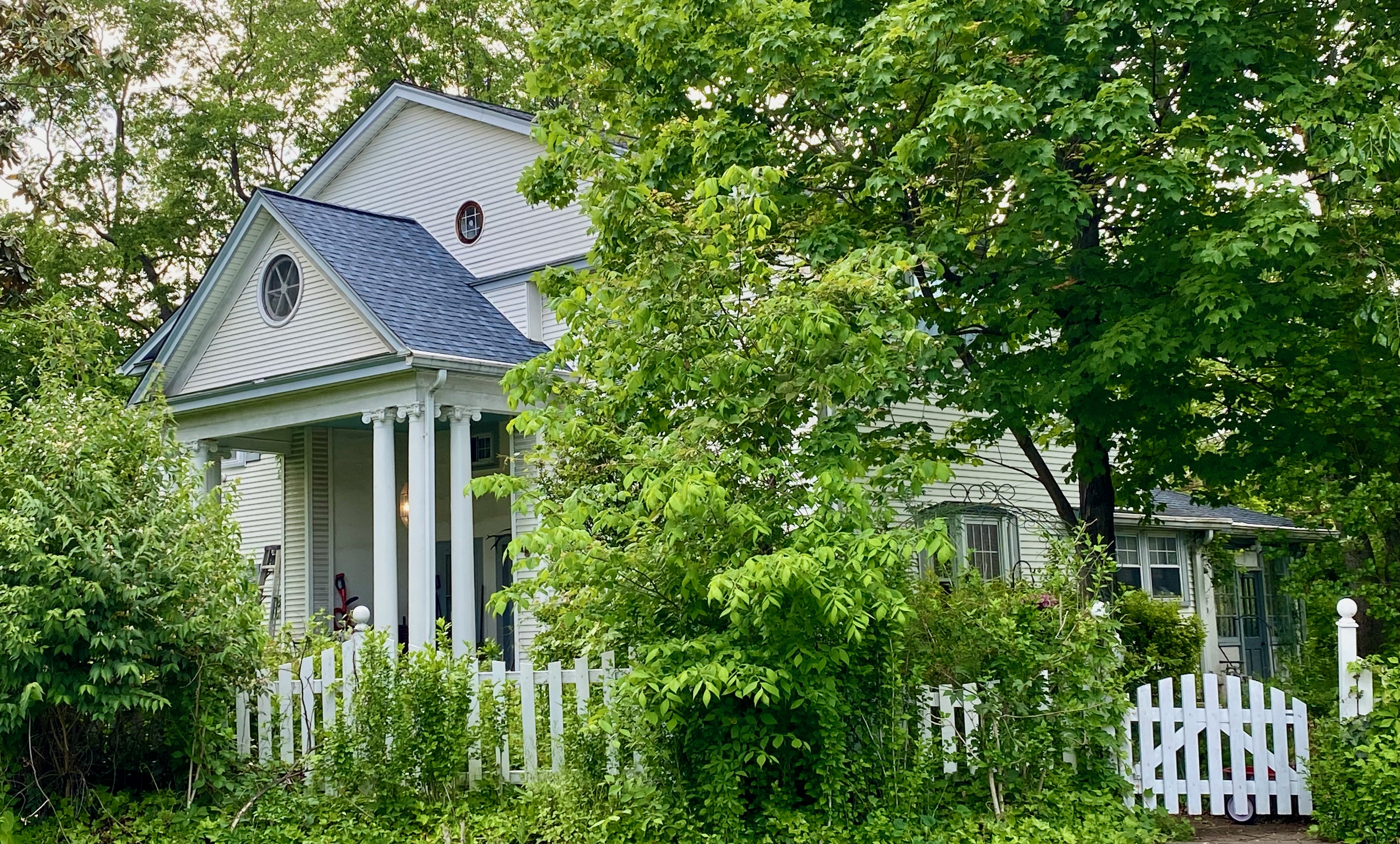
Cruit farmhouse, c. 1846

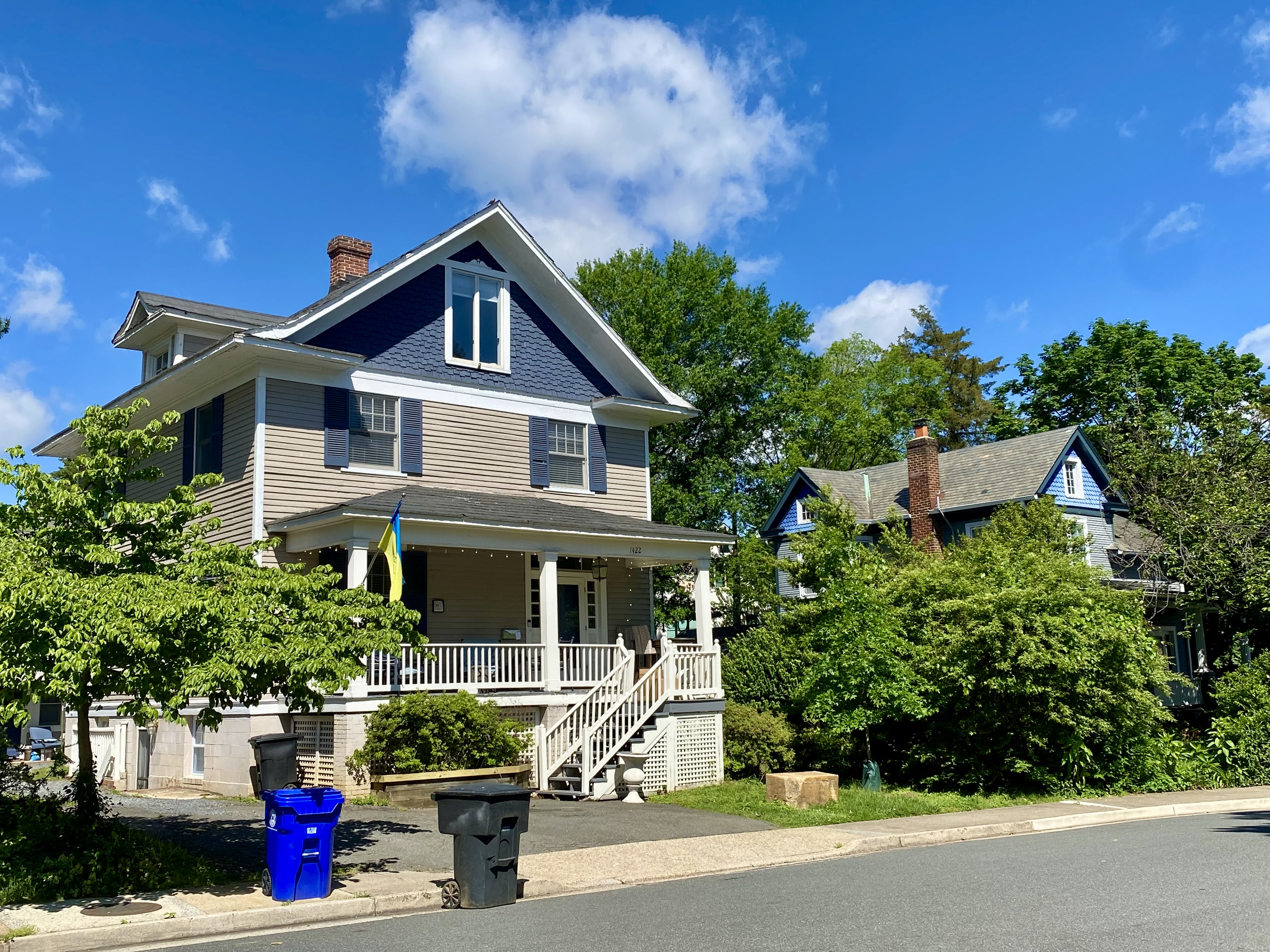
Queen Anne, c. 1925 and c. 1903

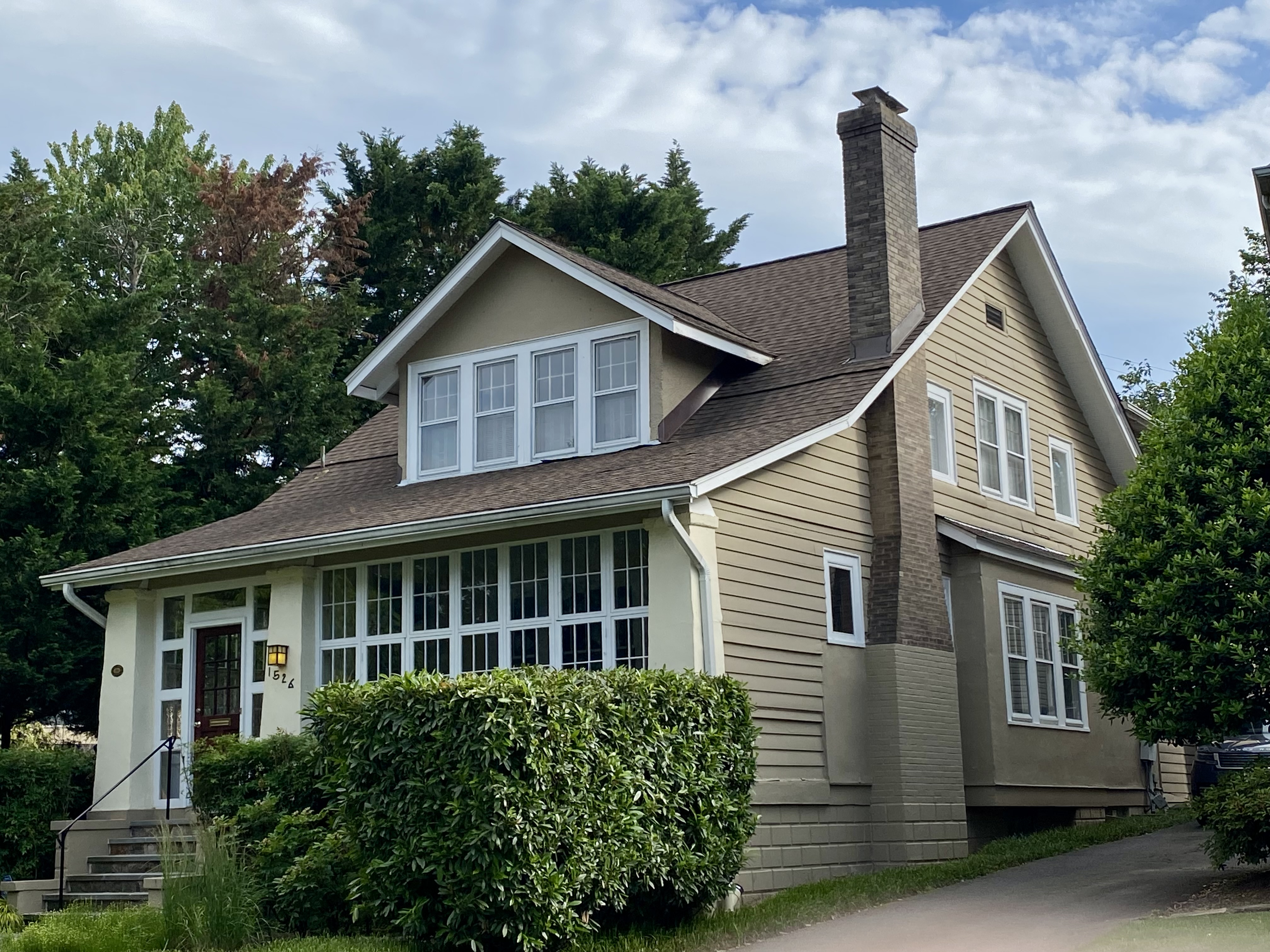
Craftsman Bungalow, c. 1915–1930

=== 1923-1950 ===
Homes that were part of Lyon Village's first section east of North Highland Street are mostly wood-frame, brick-faced structures built in the Colonial Revival, Craftsman, Spanish Mission Revival, Tudor Revival, and Classical Revival styles. Many of them represent more standardized, diluted forms designed for mass suburbanization; the neighborhood contains numerous examples of Sears kit houses. Houses of this period are set on lots of less than an acre along tree-lined, curvilinear streets.

Buildings constructed after the first phase of development between 1930 and 1950 include Cape Cod style cottages, larger Colonial Revival homes, and several garden apartment complexes that have Art Deco and Classical Revival elements. These properties are arranged in a more grid-like street pattern. The Lyon Village Citizen's Association was particularly insistent on advocating for the Colonial Revival style during Lyon Village's initial development. Hence, over 60% of houses in the neighborhood contain Colonial Revival elements.

Lyon Village also has 3 churches that were all established in the first quarter of the 20th century. The church buildings, which were constructed in the Colonial Revival and Gothic Revival styles, generally date between 1929 and 1950.

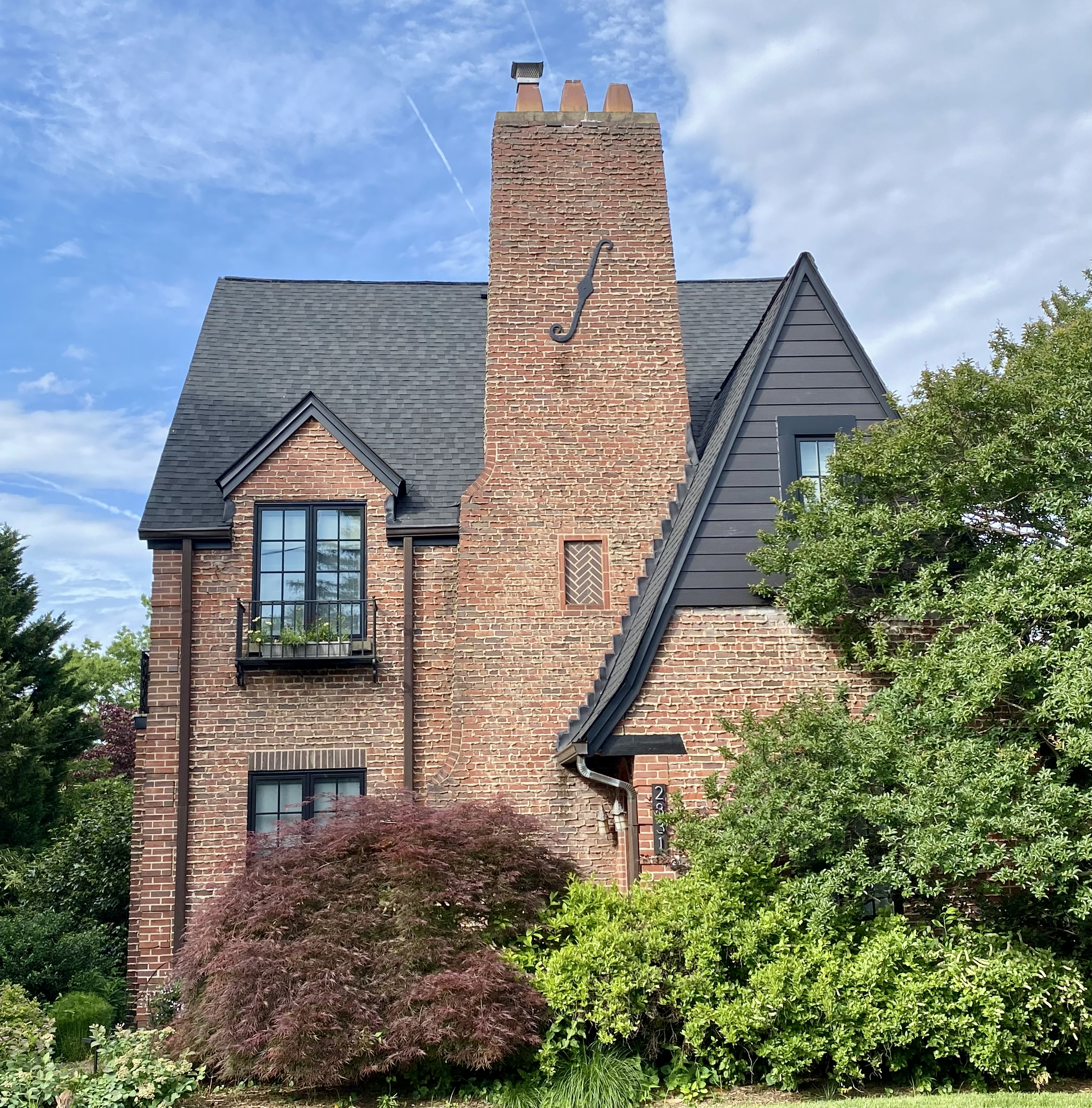
High-style Tudor Revival, c. 1927

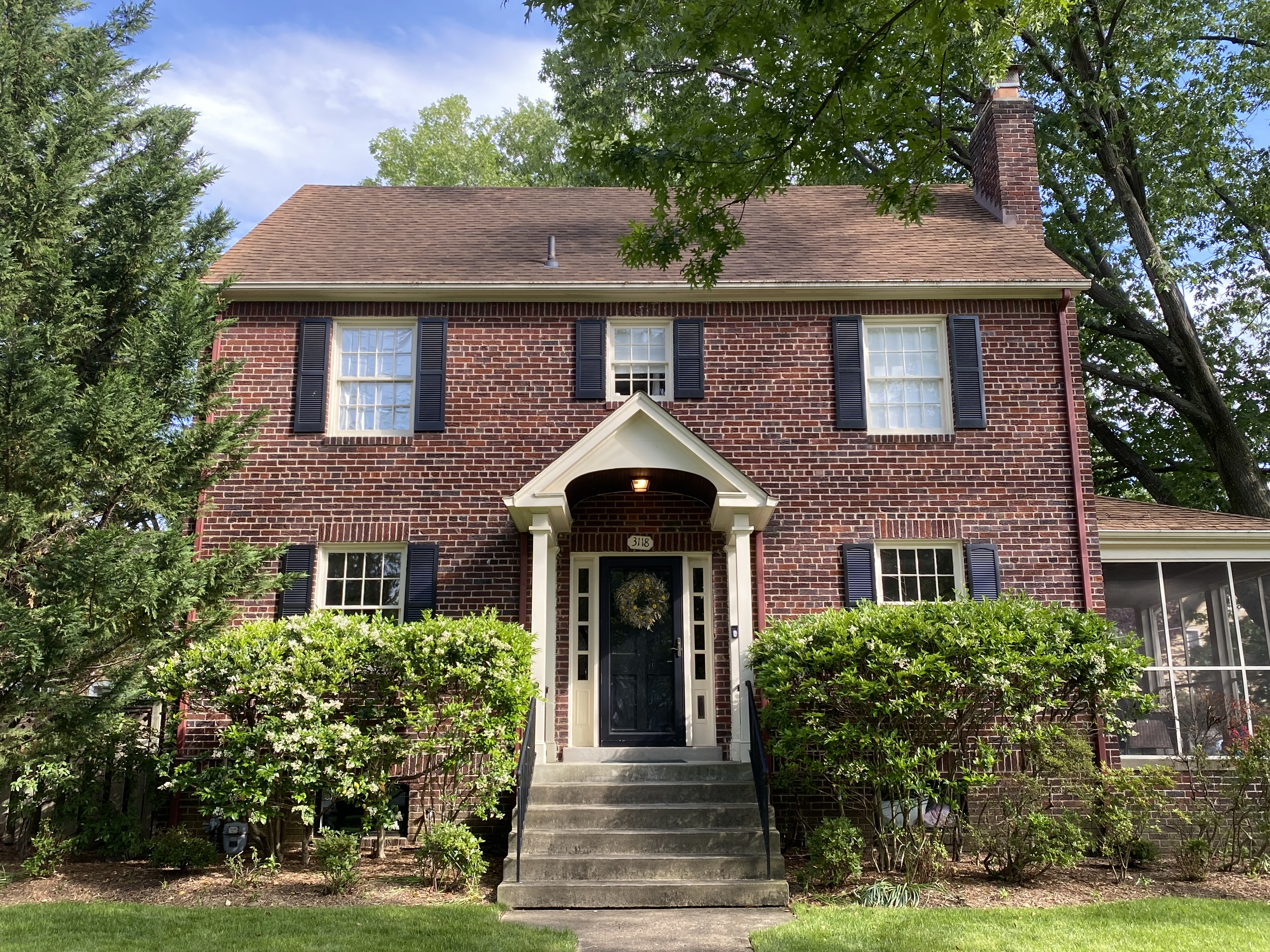
Colonial Revival, c. 1937

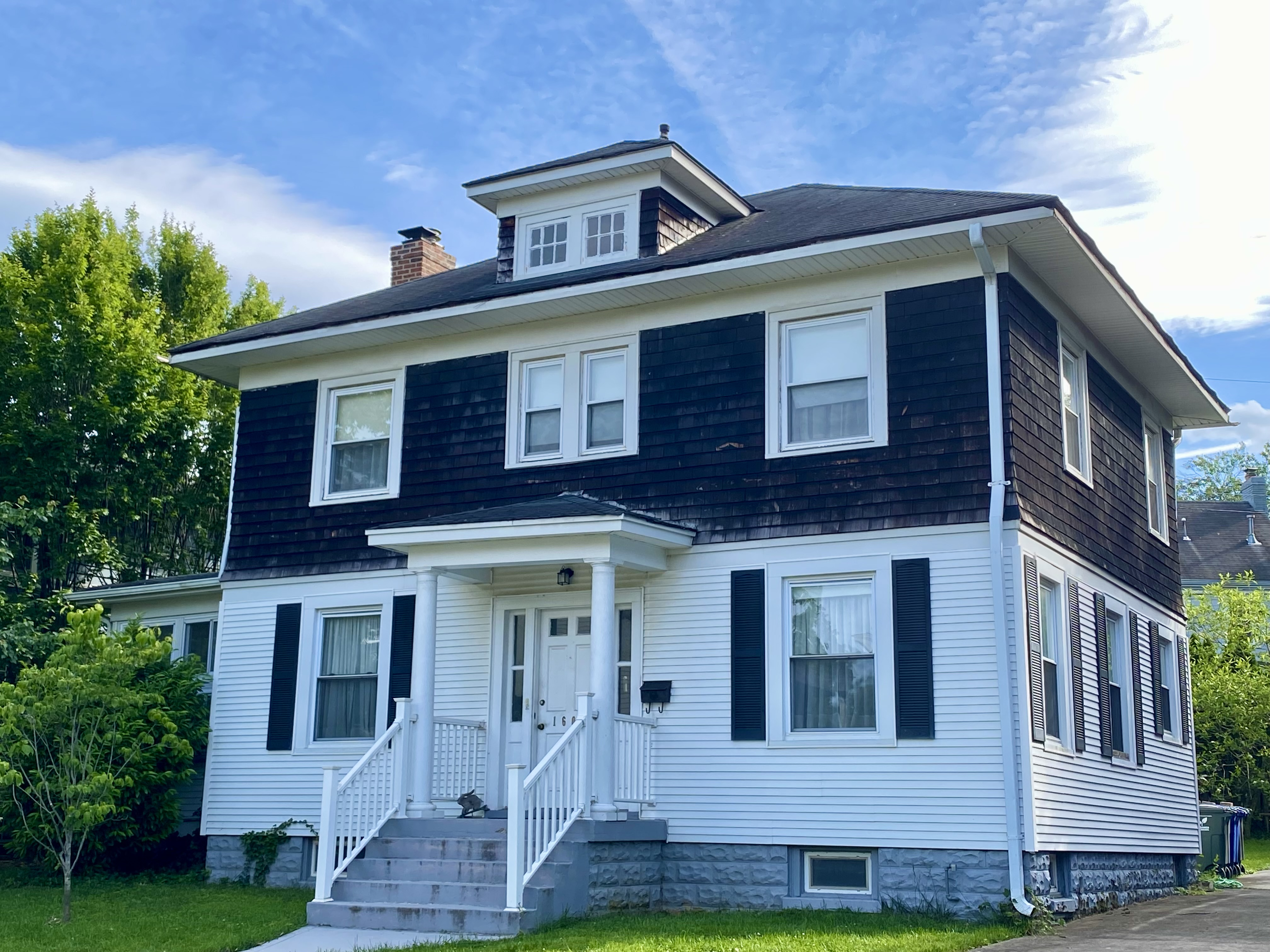
American Foursquare, c. 1939

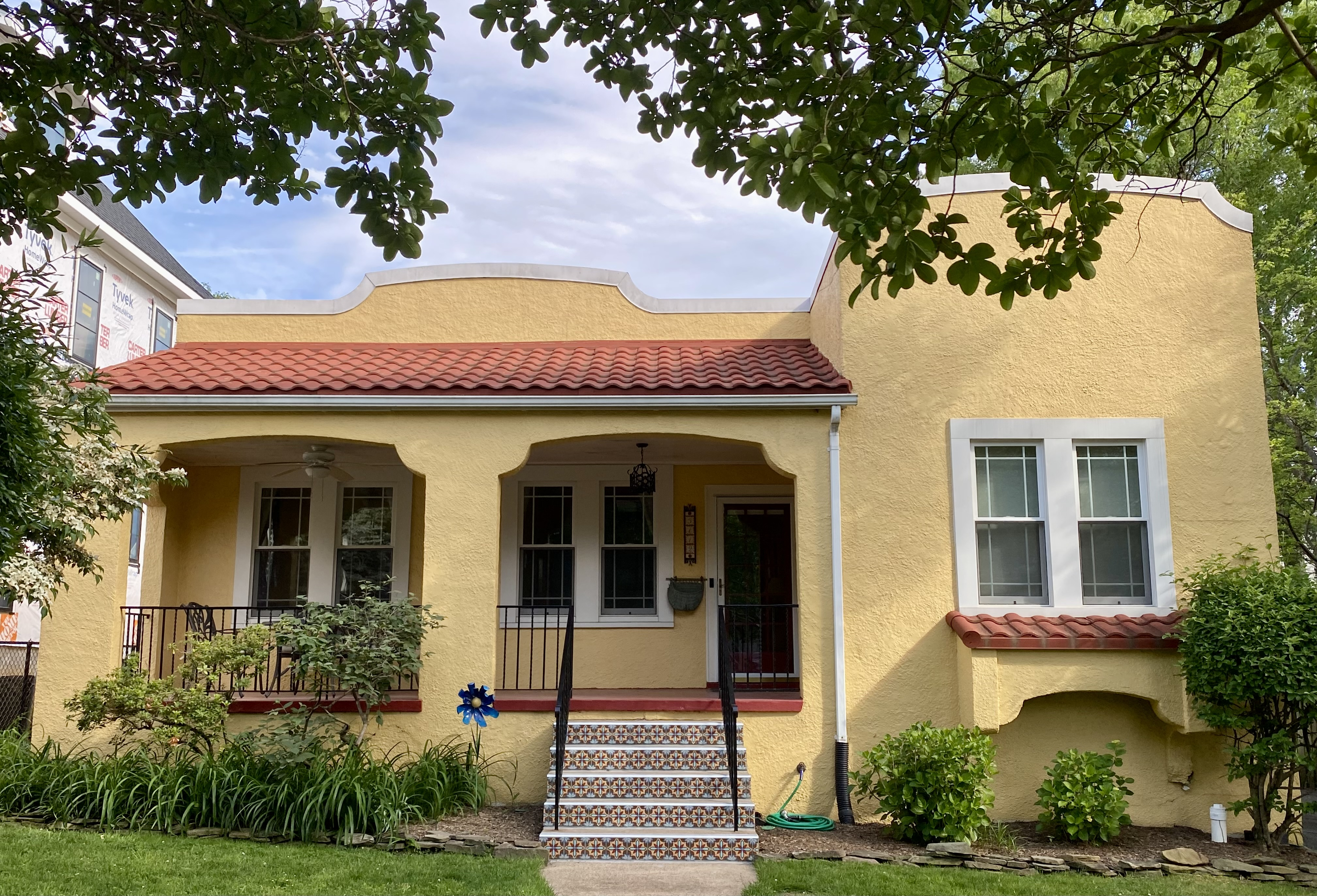
Mission Revival, c. 1925–1930

== Geography ==
Lyon Village is located in northern Arlington County and is bounded by Langston Boulevard, North Veitch Street, North Franklin Road, North Highland Street, North Fillmore Street, and North Kirkwood Road. It is bordered by the neighborhoods of Clarendon, Court House, Colonial Village, Virginia Square, Cherrydale, and Maywood. Lyon Village is low-density and primarily consists of single-family dwellings situated on lots of less than an acre. Streets follow curvilinear and grid patterns and are landscaped with trees, medians, and traffic circles. The higher-density Rosslyn-Ballston corridor, which follows the Silver and Orange Metro lines, is located directly to Lyon Village's south.

== Infrastructure ==
Colonial Village is adjacent to Langston Boulevard, which is a component highway of U.S. Route 29, and Interstate 66. Wilson Boulevard runs to the south of the neighborhood. The Custis Trail, a shared-use path, is accessible through N Veitch Street.

=== Public transit ===
6 Capital Bikeshare stations are located near Lyon Village on N Kirkwood Road, Langston Boulevard, Wilson Boulevard, and N Veitch Street. The Clarendon and Court House Metro stations along the Orange and Silver Metrorail lines are to Lyon Village's south and southeast in the adjacent Clarendon and Court House neighborhoods, as well as the following Metrobus and Arlington Transit bus routes:

- Metrobus A58: Wilson Blvd-Farragut Sq
- ART 41: Columbia Pike-Ballston-Courthouse
- ART 43: Courthouse-Rosslyn-Crystal City
- ART 45: Columbia Pike-DHS/Sequoia-Rosslyn
- ART 55: Rosslyn-East Falls Church
- ART 61: Rosslyn-Court House Metro Shuttle

== Neighborhood amenities ==
Lyon Village has two parks. Lyon Village Park, a 2-acre park located on North Highland Street, has a playground, tennis and basketball courts, and a sprayground open between Memorial Day and Labor Day. James Hunter Park, which is named for former Arlington County Board member James B. Hunter III, is located on North Hartford Street and contains green space and a dog park. The Lyon Village Citizens' Association organizes a variety of annual neighborhood gatherings, including an Independence Day parade, and Easter egg hunt, and December holiday party. The neighborhood's community house has a hall with a stage for hosting meetings, classes, and other social events.

== Bibliography ==
- Abbott, Dorthea (October 1986). "The Roots of Clarendon" (PDF). Arlington Historical Magazine. 8 (2).
- Bestebreurtje, Lindsey (2024). Built by the People Themselves: African American Community Development in Arlington, Virginia, from the Civil War through Civil Rights. Columbia: The University of South Carolina Press. ISBN 978-1-64336-498-8.
- Trieschmann, Laura V.; Weidlich, Robin J.; Didden, Amanda M. (June 2001). National Register of Historic Places Registration Form - Lyon Village Historic District (PDF). National Park Service.
