= Reevesland =

Coordinates: 38.869809°N 77.133763°W

Reevesland (Reeves Farmhouse or Torreyson Farm) is the remnant of an estate that was once located in the present Boulevard Manor neighborhood of Arlington County, Virginia. The former estate, located at 400 N. Manchester Street in the western part of the county, now consists of 2.4 acres (1.0 ha) of land with a house and outbuildings that were originally part of a 160 acres (65 ha) dairy farm.

== History ==
Reevesland has the distinction of being the last operating dairy farm in Arlington. The 160-acre farm remained in the same family for three generations and it represents an important era in Arlington’s history, when the area was transformed from a sleepy, rural community into the thriving suburban/urban county it is today. Reevesland was the name given to the farm and dairy operation by George Reeves.

Originally known as the Torreyson Farm, the land was purchased in 1863 by William H. Torreyson, who built a house around 1865 and used it as a tenant house. In 1898, it became the home of Torreyson’s daughter, Lucy and her husband, George Reeves. The last owner of the original property and farmhouse was Nelson Reeves, son of George Reeves. He was born in the existing farmhouse in 1900 and spent his life there, working as a third-generation farmer. In 1932, Reevesland began using milking machines — a sign of modernization. Nelson and his father continued to operate the farm during the Depression and World War II. The family continued to raise dairy cattle and crops until 1955, about the time that tank trucks replaced milk cans. After farming operations ceased, most of the land was subdivided and sold. Only two acres containing the farmhouse remain.

The Arlington County government purchased Reevesland in 2001 to enlarge the heavily-used Bluemont Park and provide additional recreational opportunities to County residents. The acquisition of the property allowed the County to protect a popular sledding hill and to preserve the remaining portion of the County’s last dairy farm. The Arlington County Board designated the building to be a local historic district on December 11, 2004.

== Future plans ==
On May 19, 2015, the Arlington County Board voted to sell the Reeves farmhouse and 6,000 square feet (560 m^{2}) of land to private buyers. In August 2015, a coalition of neighborhood and historic preservation groups, including the Arlington Historical Society, the Boulevard Manor Civic Association, and Preservation Arlington, proposed to establish a new nonprofit group with the goal of acquiring and maintaining the historic Reeves farmhouse.

== See also ==
- List of Arlington County Historic Districts
