= George Crossman House =

Historic house in Virginia, United States

- U.S. National Register of Historic Places
- Virginia Landmarks Register
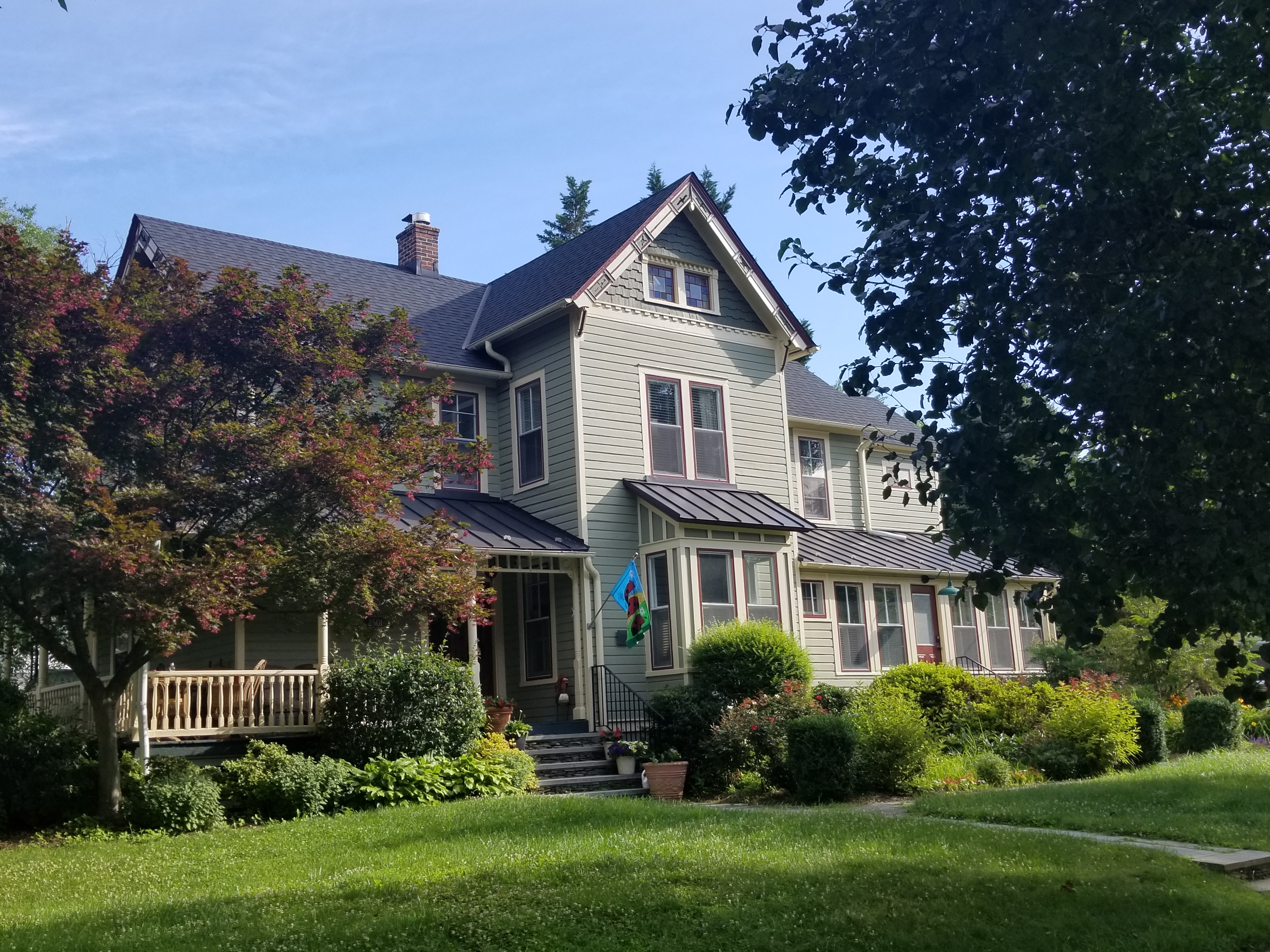
- Location: 2501 N. Underwood St., Arlington, Virginia
- Area: less than one acre
- Built: 1892
- Architectural style: Late Victorian
- NRHP reference No.: 03000455
- VLR No.: 000-8826

Significant dates
- Added to NRHP: May 22, 2003
- Designated VLR: December 4, 2002

George Crossman House is an historic home located in the East Falls Church section of Arlington, Virginia. It was built in 1892 by George Grant Crossman for his bride Mary Ellen (Nellie) Dodge of Lewinsville, Virginia. They married on April 7, 1892.

The house was once part of a 60-acre (24 ha) dairy farm in what was then rural Northern Virginia. The Crossman Farm's dairy products were sold to local neighbors as well as to the Maryland and Virginia Milk Producers Association. The Crossman's son William helped operate the farm and later assumed ownership and management of the house and dairy operation, which was one of the last dairy farms in Arlington County.

The East Falls Church neighborhood was part of the city of Falls Church until 1936. The Crossman Farm property included the house and several outbuildings, including two barns which no longer exist. The street running in front of the house was known as Crossman Street until its name was changed to North Underwood Street in 1935. The dairy was closed by 1949 and the land was sold by the Crossman Family in 1954. A portion of the property became the Tuckahoe Gardens subdivision. Tuckahoe Elementary School and Bishop O'Connell High School stand on land that was once part of the Crossman Farm.

== Crossman Family ==
George Grant Crossman (1863-1942) was the son of Isaac Crossman (1824-1900) (also spelled Crossmun) who played an important role in the development of the city of Falls Church. In 1864, Isaac Crossman came from Punxsutawney, Pennsylvania, to Northern Virginia, where he purchased the 126-acre Osborn-Hunter farm from Cyrus, Seth and Mary Osborn located in the areas now known as Falls Church and East Falls Church. Just a month earlier, his wife Mary Ann Mutersbaugh had died from complications following childbirth. The infant died as well, leaving Isaac a widower with seven young children, including George Grant Crossman. In 1866, Isaac married Elizabeth Peffer. Isaac Crossman was a business and civic leader, serving as Alderman on the first Falls Church Council when the city was incorporated in 1875 and becoming a director of the Fairfax and Georgetown Turnpike Company. He later donated the land for the Christ Crossman Methodist Church. Isaac died of stomach cancer on July 8, 1900, and is buried at Oakwood Cemetery in Falls Church.

In 1890, Isaac Crossman deeded approximately 60 acres of land to his son George, who began building Crossman House in anticipation of his upcoming engagement to Nellie Dodge in March 1892. George Crossman was described in the local newspaper as a "popular ladies' man," while Nellie was "one of Lewinsville's fair daughters." After the wedding, the local newspaper reported "the bride was duly installed in a brand new house all furnished and ready for occupancy."

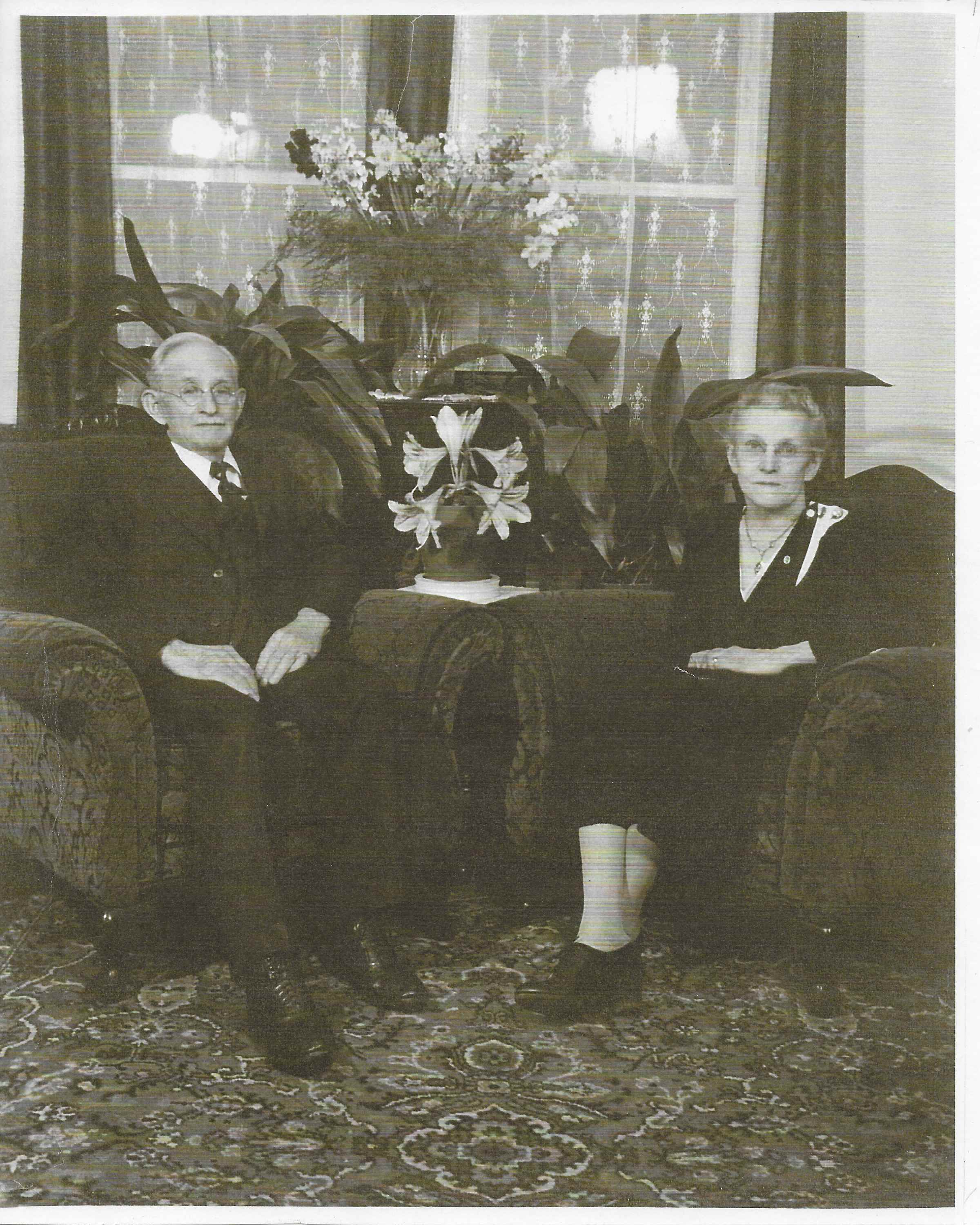
George and Mary Ellen (Nellie) Crossman in front parlor of Crossman House circa 1923.

George and Nellie had six children, four of whom survived infancy: William Clark (1894), Florence Celeste (1897), George Isaac (1900) and Mary Louise (1903).

On September 16, 1899, the family made local news when four-year-old William Clark Crossman was gored in the arm by a cow's horn, which cut open six inches of the child's arm, "nearly severing an artery." William Crossman was born at Crossman House and helped his father George run the Crossman dairy farm as a young man and later managed the farm until his retirement in 1949, when the farm closed and the land was divided. Land was donated for Steward Elementary School, which is now a park. Land was sold to build Tuckahoe Elementary School, Tuckahoe Park, and Bishop O'Connell High School. The house itself remained vacant for about five years. William Crossman died of pneumonia at Arlington Hospital on April 2, 1980.

== Later History ==
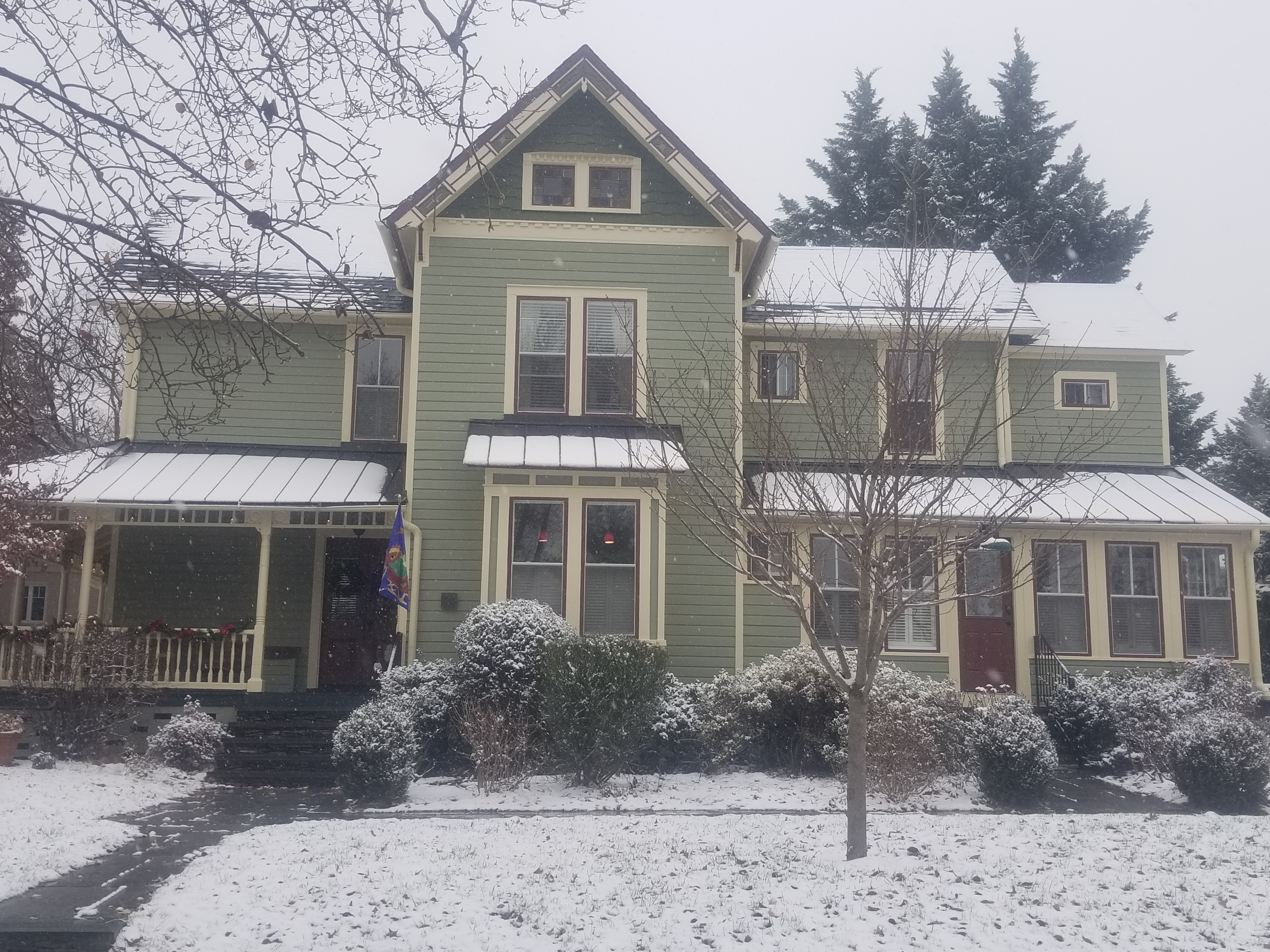
Crossman House was repainted green in fall 2017. The house was white for many years, but based on areas of paint uncovered during the 2012 renovation, green is believed to be its historical color.

In 1955, the house was purchased by Stephen and Irmgard Grey, who obtained its historic designation. Mrs. Grey was a secretary for U.S. Senator John Warner (R-VA) and, according to local legend, Warner's then-wife the actress Elizabeth Taylor visited the house. When Stephen Grey sold the house in 1991, it required significant restoration and renovation, which was undertaken by the three subsequent owners. Awarded the 2000 Arlington Heritage Award for restoration, it remains a private residence.

== Architecture ==
The house is two-story, four-square Late Victorian farmhouse. Although the architect of the Crossman House is unknown, it resembles the type of house that was available through mail-order catalogues in the late 19th century. The house exhibits the characteristics of both the Queen Anne and Folk Victorian styles, including the asymmetrical plan, dominant front-facing gable and use of patterned wood shingles (now asphalt), weatherboards, and projecting bays. The house sits on a fieldstone foundation and has a cross-gable roof. It features an original wraparound front porch with turned posts and balusters.

The house has three staircases. The railing of the main staircase which leads from the entry hall to the second level is decorated with wood squares that were originally made by the Smoot Lumber Company of Alexandria. When the staircase was restored in the 1990s, Smoot was able to locate the original saw blade to make the replacement squares. One of the most interesting and unusual features of the house is the carvings in the exterior eaves that, when the sun shines, creates shadows that make it appear as if birds are flying against the house. The house was painted white for more than 70 years. During the 2012 renovation, the removal of an area of dry wall revealed a layer of green paint on the exterior. Based on the paint discovery and an old photo, the house was recently repainted to what is believed to be more historically accurate colors.

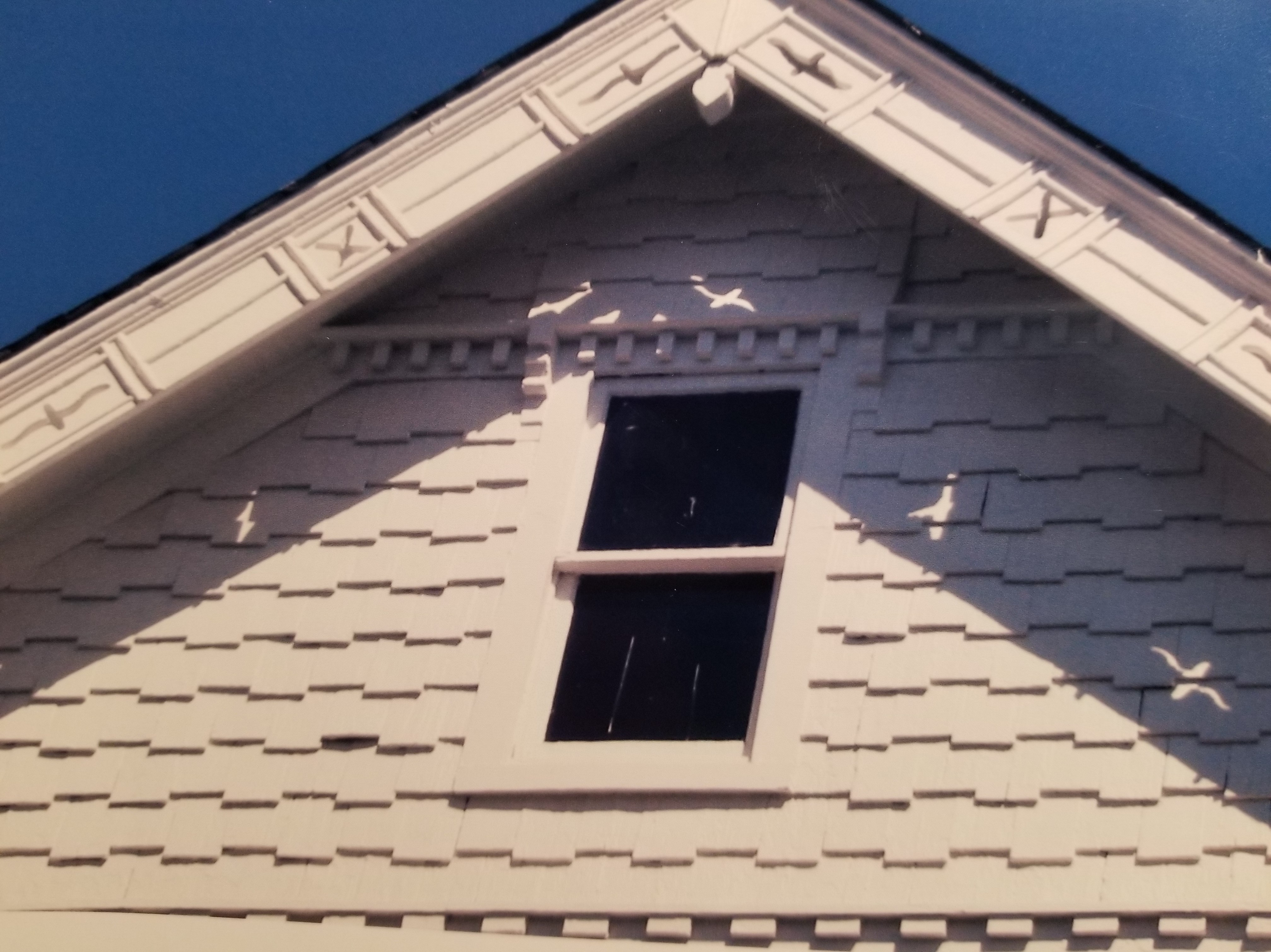
One of the more unusual features of the house is the carving on the eaves. When the sun shines, the shadows create the illusion of flying birds.

The Arlington County Board designated the building to be a local historic district on May 17, 1986. The National Park Service listed the house on the National Register of Historic Places on May 22, 2003

== See also ==
- List of Arlington County Historic Districts
