= Barcroft Community House =

- U.S. National Register of Historic Places
- Virginia Landmarks Register
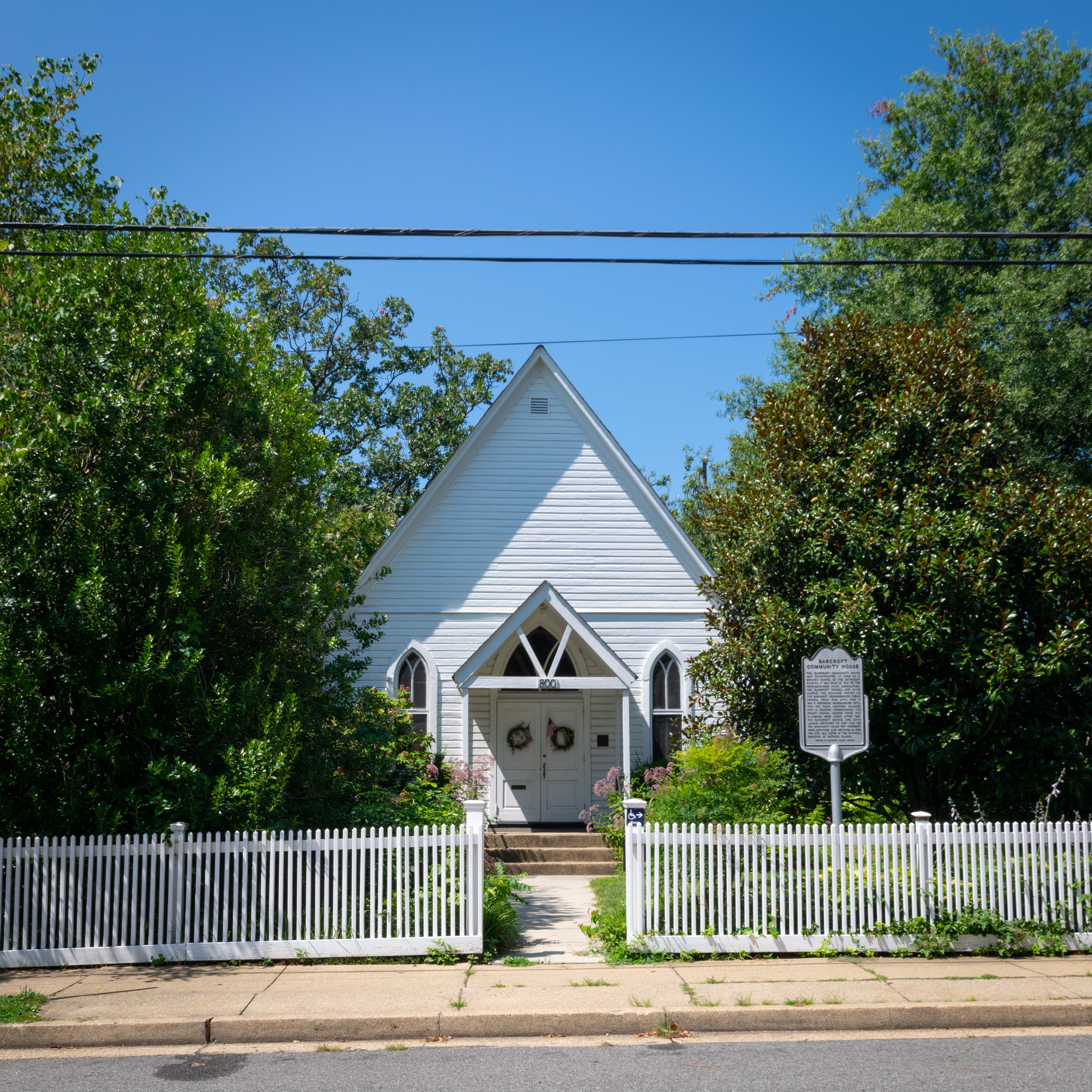
- Barcroft Community House

- Location within District of Columbia Location within Virginia Location within the United States
- Location: 800 S. Buchanan St., Arlington, Virginia
- Coordinates: 38°51′34″N 77°6′37″W
- Area: 0.3 acres (0.12 ha)
- Built: 1908
- Architectural style: Bungalow/craftsman
- NRHP reference No.: 95000928
- VLR No.: 000-0040

Significant dates
- Added to NRHP: July 28, 1995
- Designated VLR: April 28, 1995

Barcroft Community House is a historic community center located at Arlington, Virginia. It was built in 1908, and is a one-story, American Craftsman style frame building. It initially served as a church building for the Methodist Episcopal Church. It housed the Barcroft School until a new school building opened in 1925. The building has served collectively as a church, school, and community meeting place since its construction.

The Arlington County Board designated the building to be a local historic district on January 7, 1984. The National Park Service listed the house on the National Register of Historic Places on July 28, 1995. The Arlington County government erected a historic marker near the house in 1999.

== See also ==
- List of Arlington County Historic Districts
