= List of Arlington County Historic Districts =

This is a list page of all Historic Districts that the County Board of Arlington County, Virginia, has designated as of March 8, 2018. The term “historic district” includes both individual and collections of historic buildings, sites or objects.

== Cemeteries ==
- Ball-Carlin Cemetery (1785)
- Ball Family Burial Grounds (1814)
- Robert Ball Sr. Family Burial Ground (1854)
- Calloway Cemetery (1891)
- Travers Family Graveyard (1830)
- Walker Chapel and Cemetery (1871)

== Commercial buildings ==
- Green Valley Pharmacy (1942)
- Dan Kain Building (1946)

== Community buildings ==
- Barcroft Community House (1907)
- Carlin Community Hall (1892)
- Clarendon Citizens Hall (1921)

== Forts ==
- Fort C.F. Smith (1863)
- Fort Ethan Allen (1861)
- Fort Ethan Allen Trench (1861)

== Garden Apartment Complexes ==
- Colonial Village (1934)
- Buckingham Villages (1937-1953)
- Cambridge Courts (1943)

== Houses ==
- Alcova (1860)
- Ball–Sellers House (1760)
- Broadview (1881)
- George Crossman House (1892)
- Dawson Bailey House (1856)
- Eastman-Fenwick House (1876)
- Fraber House (1913)
- Glebe House (1854-1857)
- Glenmore (1910)
- Harry Gray House (1881)
- The Hermitage (1931)
- Reevesland (ca. 1900)
- Washington/Torreyson Farm House (ca. 1879)

== Industrial structures ==
- Benjamin Elliott's Coal Trestle

== Institutional Buildings ==
- Arlington Post Office (1937)
- Cherrydale Volunteer Fire House (1919)

== Natural elements ==
- Brandymore Castle (rock formation)

== Neighborhoods ==
- Maywood Neighborhood Historic District (1909)

== Places of Worship ==
- Lomax African Methodist Episcopal (AME) Zion Church (1922)

== Schools ==
- Clarendon (Maury) School (1910)
- Hume School (1891)
- Stratford School (1950)
- Swanson Middle School (1939)
