= George N. Saegmuller House =

Historic house in Arlington, Virginia, US

The George N. Saegmuller House is an 1894 building located in Arlington, Virginia, United States.

== Background ==
The George N. Saegmuller House is located on Reserve Hill farm, named for the reserve Union Army troops who encamped there during the American Civil War. Gilbert Vandenberg (or Vandenbergh) purchased the property from his brother in 1857. In 1894, after marrying Maria Jane Vandenberg, George Nicholas Saegmuller purchased the original house and property from her father.

The George N. Saegmuller House is 3,718 square feet and has 21 rooms and ten fireplaces. The house is now owned by the Columbus Club of Arlington, the home corporation of the Knights of Columbus Edward Douglass White Council.

== History ==
After the original wooden house burned down in 1892, George N. Saegmuller in 1894 built what is now called the George N. Saegmuller House. Construction of the mansion was completed in 1903.

Saegmuller decided to build the locally quarreled bluestone mansion in the style of the Nuremberg Castle, though the mansion has touches of traditional Southern architecture, such as the portico. The "Big House," as it is known to Saegmuller's descendants, functioned as the family's summer home until Saegmuller's 1926 retirement.

The George N. Saegmuller house was the first house in Arlington County to have a telephone line. It was installed in 1894 between the house and Easter Spring Farm, owned by John Saegmuller. The house was also the first to have running water in the county. This was done through the construction of the water tower in 1896. The water tower was modelled after one on the Nuremberg city wall in Germany. Saegmuller had a beer stein of that tower, which remains a family heirloom. The George N. Saegmuller house was equipped with the latest technology of the time: a gas lighting system and four bathrooms, one with a shower.

The George N. Saegmuller family raised livestock, including cows, horses, pigs, chickens, geese, and guineafowl, The family also maintained a vineyard and orchard, and grew crops such as corn and hay. By 1891, George N. Saegmuller was thought of as one of the "principle farmers" in the country. In 1882, Saegmuller built a stone barn, in the spot where now sits the Knights of Columbus EDW Hall. The Reserve Hill property also included three tenant farmers' houses and a house for the foreman. The area of the farm totalled over 240 acres by 1911.

Saegmuller died in the home on his 87th birthday, February 12, 1934. The George N. Saegmuller House remained a private home until 1951. That year, it was bought by the then-named Columbus Club of Clarendon
