= Buckingham Historic District =

Historic district in Virginia, United States

- U.S. National Register of Historic Places
- U.S. Historic district
- Virginia Landmarks Register
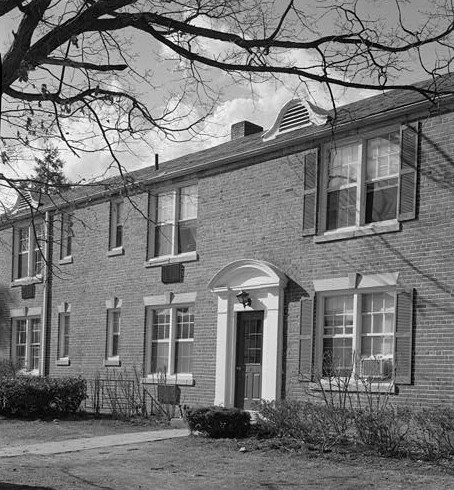
- Buckingham Apartment Complex, HABS Photo

- Location within District of Columbia Location within Virginia Location within the United States
- Location: Bounded by 11th, S. Edison, S. Dinwiddie, S. Columbus, S. George Mason, and S. Frederick St., and later expanded with boundary increases Arlington, Virginia
- Coordinates: 38°52′30″N 77°6′20″W
- Area: 123.1 acres (49.8 ha)
- Built: 1937-1941
- Built by: Paramount Communities Inc.
- Architect: Wright, Henry; Kamstra, Allan Foeke; Lueders, Albert
- Architectural style: Colonial Revival, Tudor Revival
- MPS: Garden Apartments, Apartment Houses and Apartment Complexes in Arlington County, Virginia MPS
- NRHP reference No.: 98001649, 04000048 (Boundary Increase), 10000092 (Boundary Increase)
- VLR No.: 000-0025

Significant dates
- Added to NRHP: January 21, 1999, February 11, 2004 (Boundary Increase), March 23, 2010 (Boundary Increase)
- Designated VLR: December 2, 1998 December 3, 2003 December 17, 2009

The Buckingham Historic District is a national historic district located at Arlington County, Virginia. It contains 151 contributing buildings in a residential neighborhood in North Arlington. They were built in six phases between 1937 and 1953, and primarily consist of two- and three-story, brick garden apartment buildings in the Colonial Revival-style. There is a single three-story brick building that was built in the International style. The buildings are arranged around U-shaped courtyards. The district also includes a community center, four single family dwellings, three commercial buildings and two commercial blocks.

The Arlington County government gave legal protection to some of the Buckingham buildings (those in Villages 3–12 and in the commercial area) by designating them in 1993, 1994 and 2007 as components of the County's Buckingham Village Historic District, a local historic district. However, other historic Buckingham buildings, including those in Villages 1 and 2, have been demolished. The National Park Service listed the Buckingham Historic District on the National Register of Historic Places in 1999 and expanded the listing in 2004 and 2010.

== See also ==
List of Arlington County Historic Districts
