= Maywood Historic District =

Historic house in Virginia, United States

- U.S. National Register of Historic Places
- U.S. Historic district
- Virginia Landmarks Register
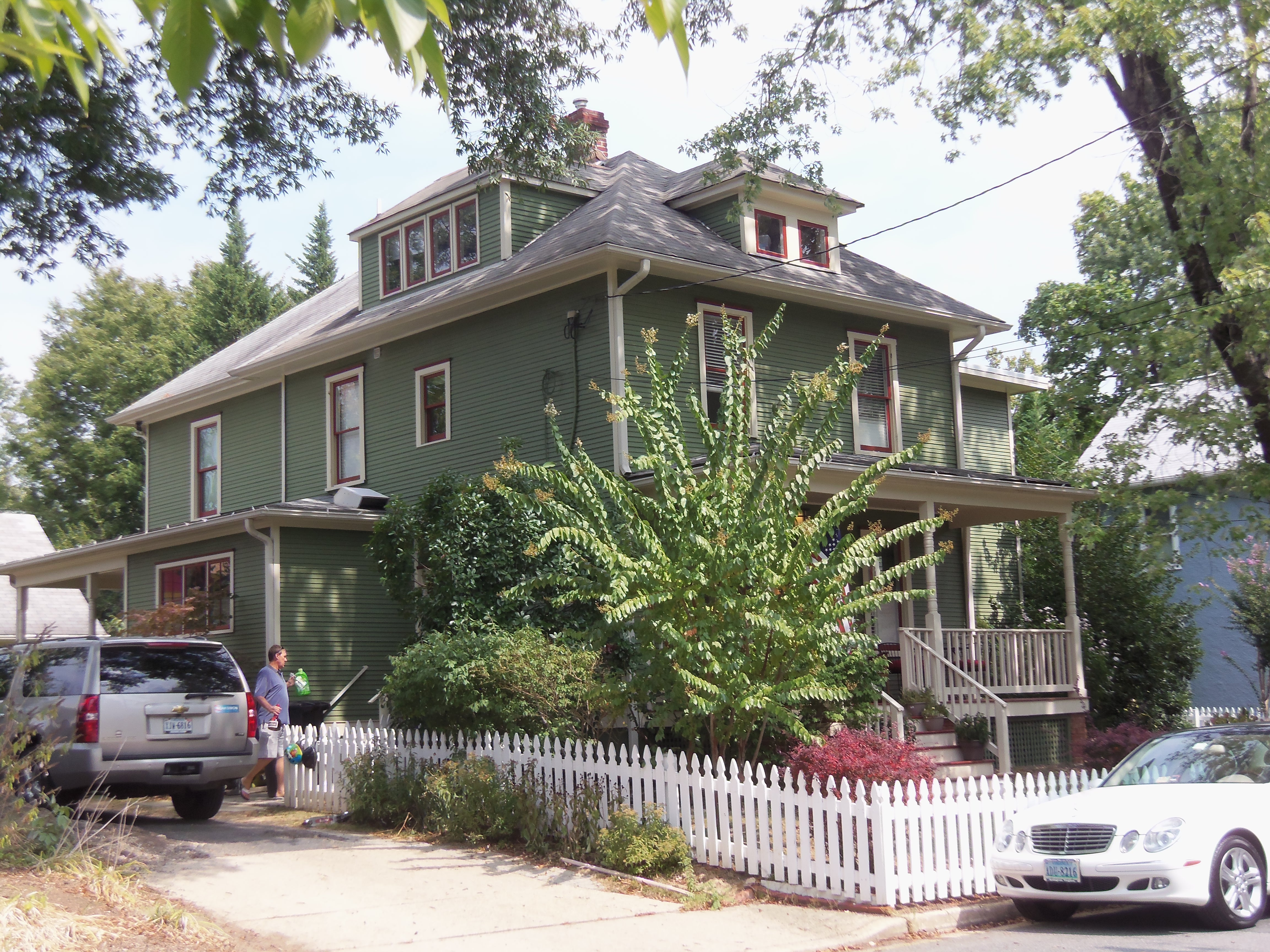

- Location within District of Columbia Location within Virginia Location within the United States
- Location: Roughly bounded by Lorcom Ln., Spout Run Parkway, I-66, Lee Highway, N. Oakland St., N. Nelson St., and N. Lincoln St.Arlington, Virginia
- Coordinates: 38°53′53″N 77°6′5″W
- Area: 46 acres (19 ha)
- Built: 1906
- Architect: Conner, J. Arthur; et al.
- Architectural style: Late Victorian, Late 19th And 20th Century Revivals
- NRHP reference No.: 03000460
- VLR No.: 000-5056

Significant dates
- Added to NRHP: May 22, 2003
- Designated VLR: May 19, 2003, February 7, 2006

The Maywood Historic District is a national historic district located in Arlington County, Virginia. It contains 198 contributing buildings in a residential neighborhood located in the northern part of the county. The area was platted and subdivided in five sections between 1909 and 1913 following the arrival in 1906 of the Great Falls and Old Dominion Railroad (later the Great Falls Division of the Washington and Old Dominion Railway). The area was primarily developed between 1909 and 1929. The dwelling styles include a variety of architectural styles, including Queen Anne, Colonial Revival foursquares, Bungalow, and two-story gable-front houses. Several dwellings in the neighborhood have been identified as prefabricated mail-order houses.

The Arlington County Board designated the neighborhood to be a local historic district on July 7, 1990. The National Park Service listed the neighborhood on the National Register of Historic Places on May 22, 2003.

== See also ==
- List of Arlington County Historic Districts
