= Theodor Horydczak =

Polish-American photographer

Theodor Horydczak (15 April 1889 – 23 September 1971) was a Polish-American photographer best known for his early photographs of the places and events of Washington, DC.

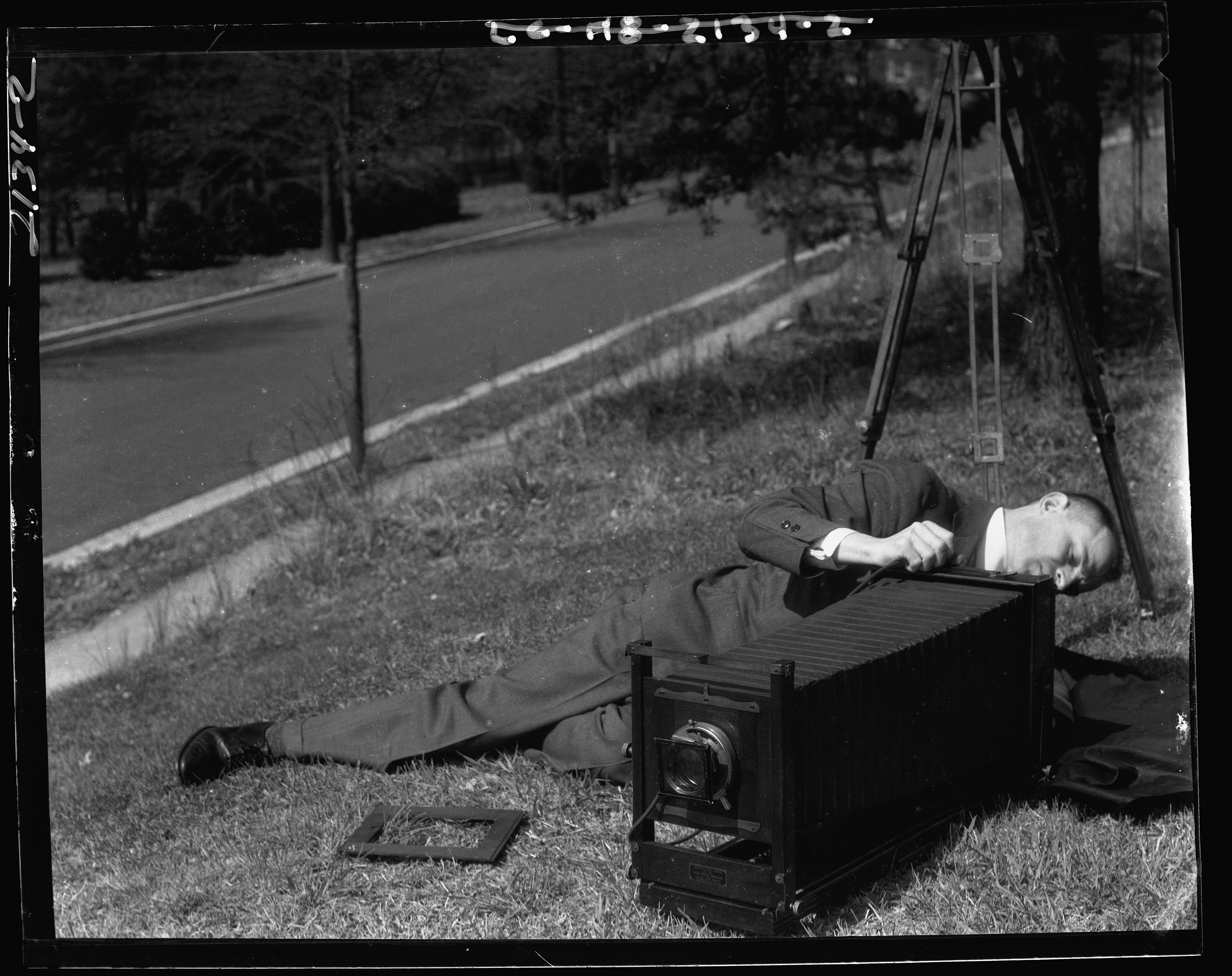
Theodor Horydczak 5a46545a

== Career ==
Horydczak was born in Lyck, Germany (now Poland) and emigrated in 1907. He is believed to have taken up photography during or after World War I, possibly while a member of the U.S. Army Signal Corps. His numerous "Washington as it Was" photographs are housed in the Library of Congress Prints and Photographs Division in the James Madison Memorial Building. He was known for his photographs of the exteriors and interiors of commercial, residential, and government buildings and of events such as the 1932 Bonus Army encampment and the 1933 World Series. He retired in 1959. Horydczak used a large-format Gold Ansco camera and typically used the photographic style called "bracketing," or taking many subsequent images at different aperture settings. He married Frederica; they had a daughter Norma. He died in Montgomery, Pennsylvania.

== Collection ==
The photographer's daughter and son-and-law, Norma and Francis Reeves, presented the collection, consisting of more than 32,000 items, including approximately 17,450 black-and-white photographs, 14,000 negatives, and 1,500 color transparencies, to the Library of Congress in 1973. The Prints and Photographs catalog divides the collection into the following subject areas:

- Business and Commerce
- Memorial Bridge Construction
- Cherry Blossoms
- Washington, D.C. in Color
- People

The Prints and Photographs Division digitized Horydczak's photographic negatives, which can be found in their catalog.
