= Glencarlyn Historic District =

Historic district in Virginia, United States

- U.S. National Register of Historic Places
- U.S. Historic district
- Virginia Landmarks Register
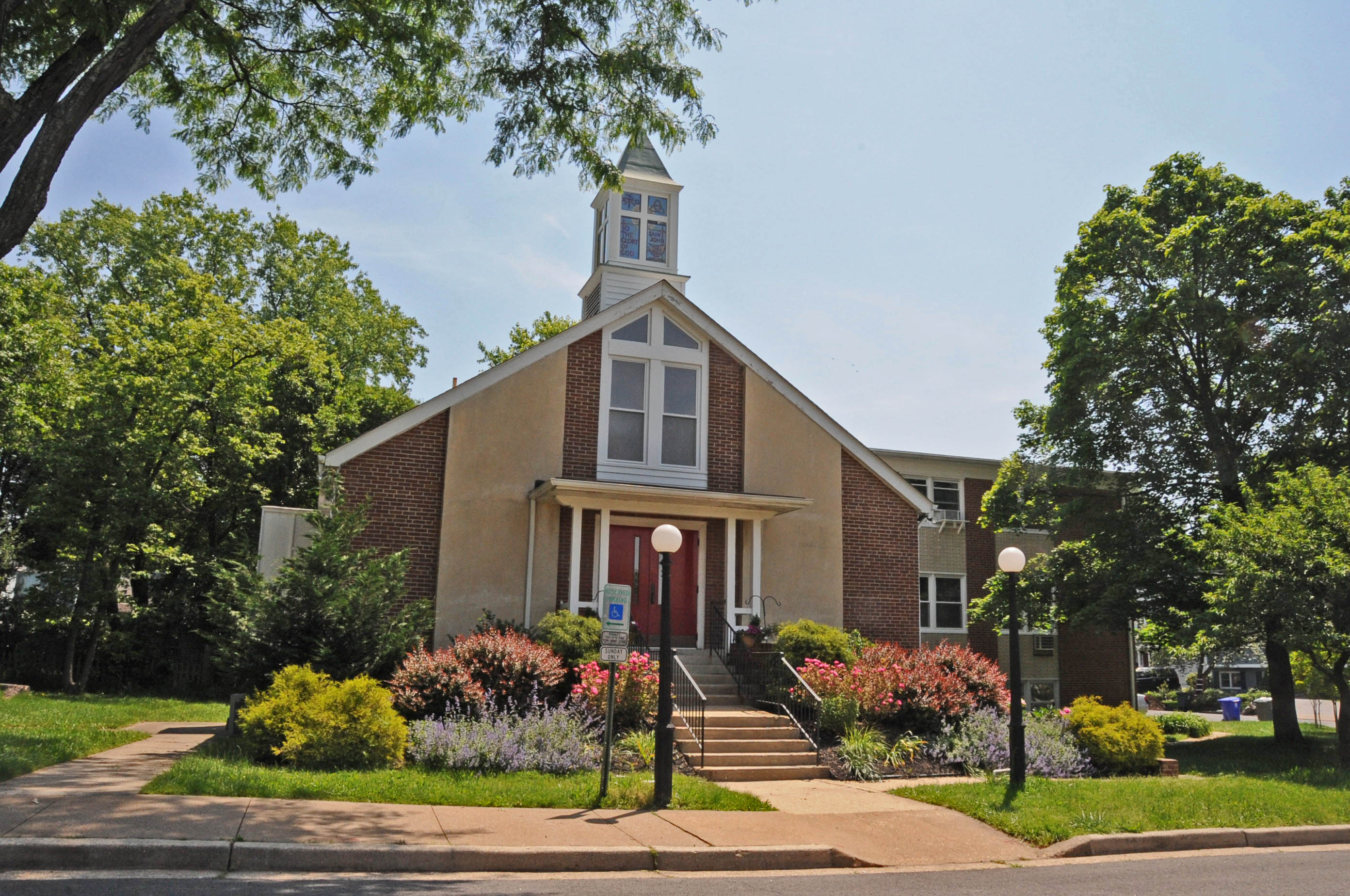
- St. John's Episcopal Church

- Location within District of Columbia Location within Virginia Location within the United States
- Location: Bounded by S. Carlin Springs Rd., Arlington Blvd., 5th Rd. S., and Glencarlyn Park, Arlington, Virginia
- Coordinates: 38°51′49″N 77°7′35″W
- Area: 135.3 acres (54.8 ha)
- Built: 1742
- Architect: Bailey, Theodore; et al.
- Architectural style: Queen Anne, Colonial Revival, Craftsman/Bungalow
- MPS: Historic Residential Suburbs in the United States, 1830–1960 MPS
- NRHP reference No.: 08000910
- VLR No.: 000-9704

Significant dates
- Added to NRHP: September 18, 2008
- Designated VLR: June 19, 2008

The Glencarlyn Historic District is a national historic district located in the Glencarlyn neighborhood of Arlington County, Virginia. It contains 276 contributing buildings, two contributing sites, one contributing structure, and one contributing object in a residential neighborhood in South Arlington. The area was platted in 1887 as Carlin Springs and continued to develop throughout the 20th century as a residential subdivision. The dwelling styles include a variety of architectural styles, ranging from Craftsman-style bungalows, Colonial Revival–style, and Queen Anne style dwellings. Notable buildings and sites include the Carlin Family Cemetery, Glencarlyn Library, and St. John's Episcopal Church. Also located in the district are the separately listed Ball-Sellers House and Carlin Hall.

It was listed on the National Register of Historic Places in 2008.
