= Arlington Public Library =

Public library system in Virginia

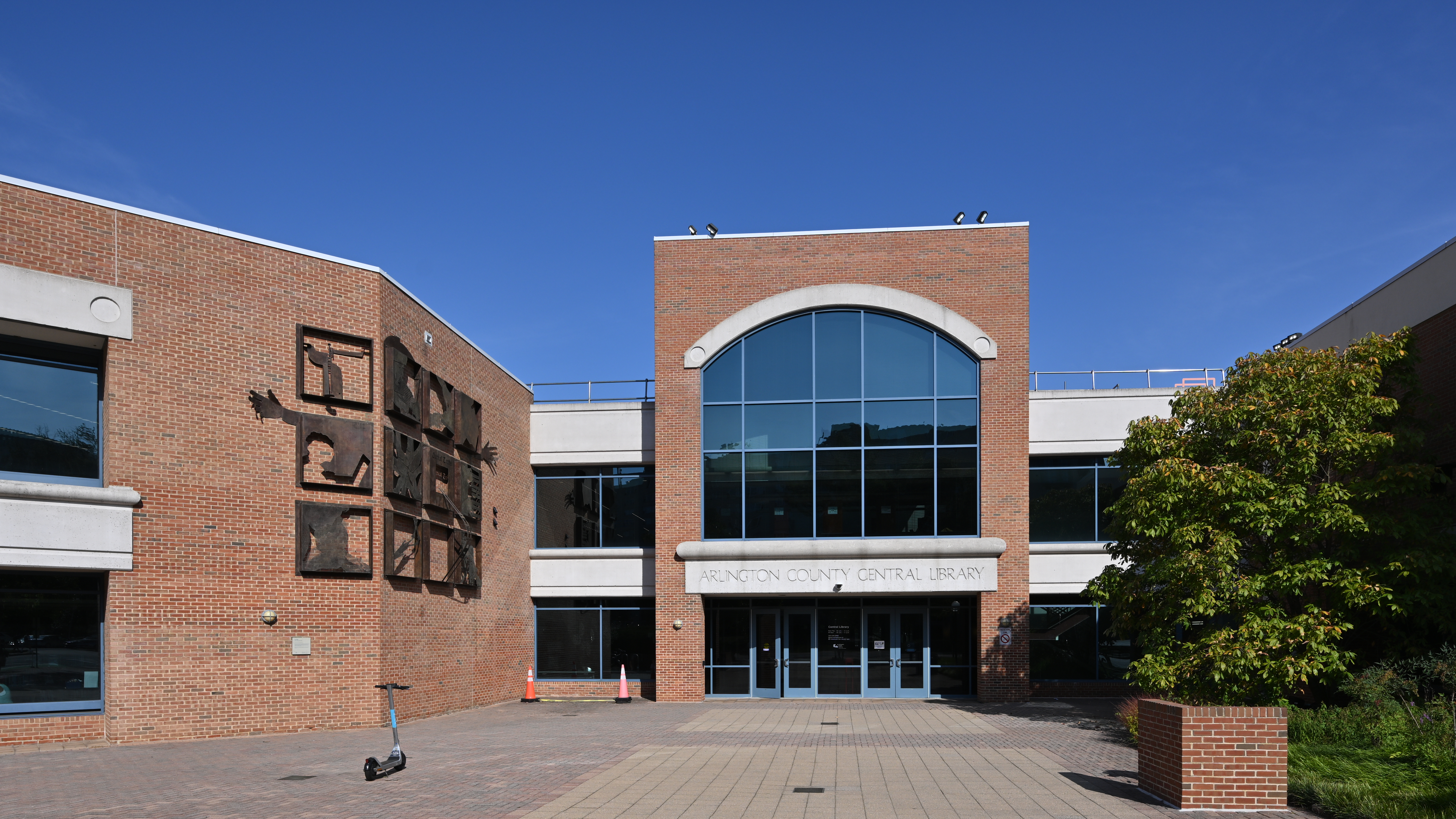
- Arlington Central Library in 2024
- Location: Arlington County, Virginia, US
- Established: 1800s
- Branches: 9

Access and use
- Population served: 243,760 (2025)

Other information
- Budget: $16,542,254 (2023)
- Director: Diane Kresh
- Website: Arlington Public Library

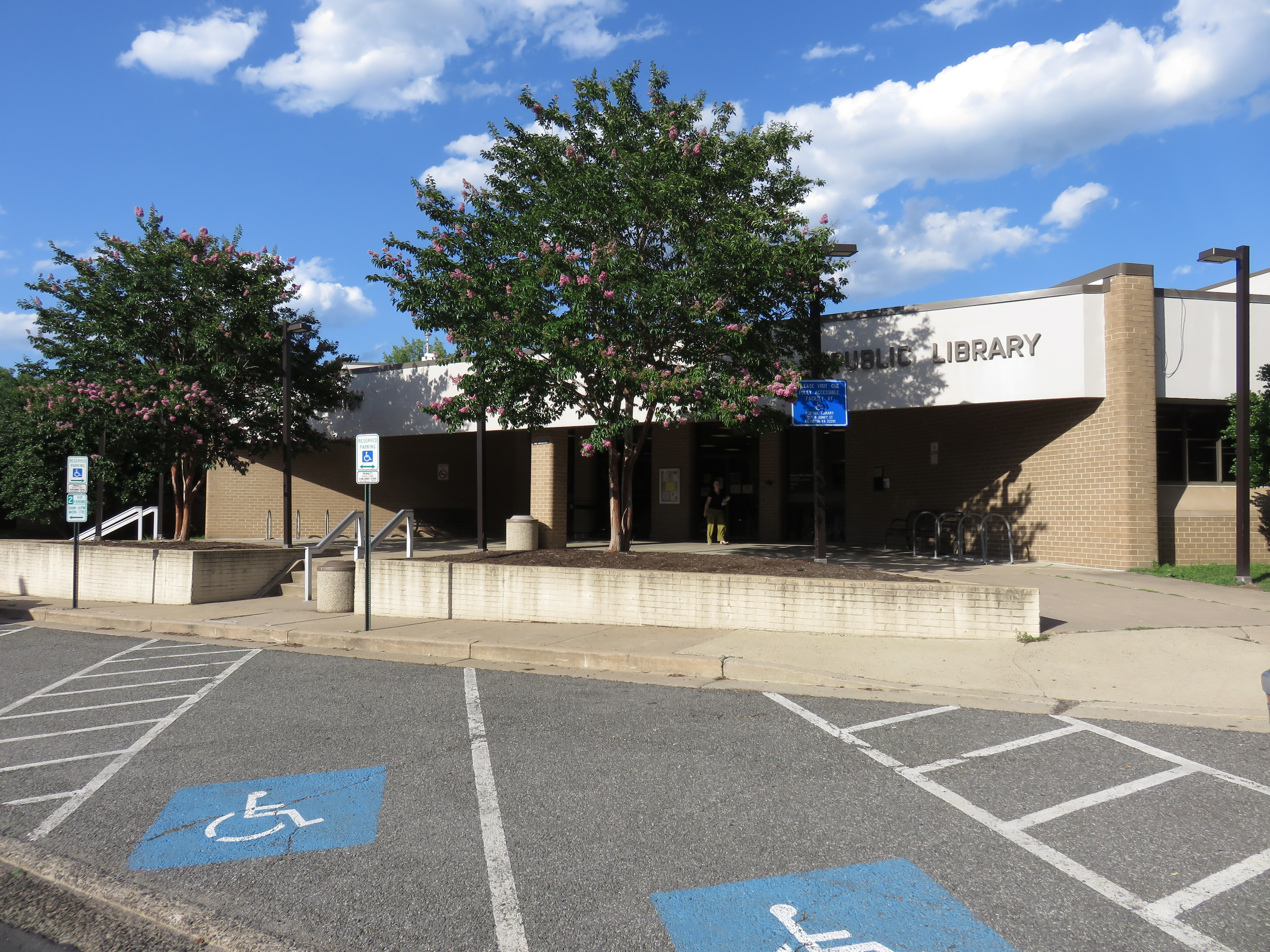
Aurora Hills Branch Library

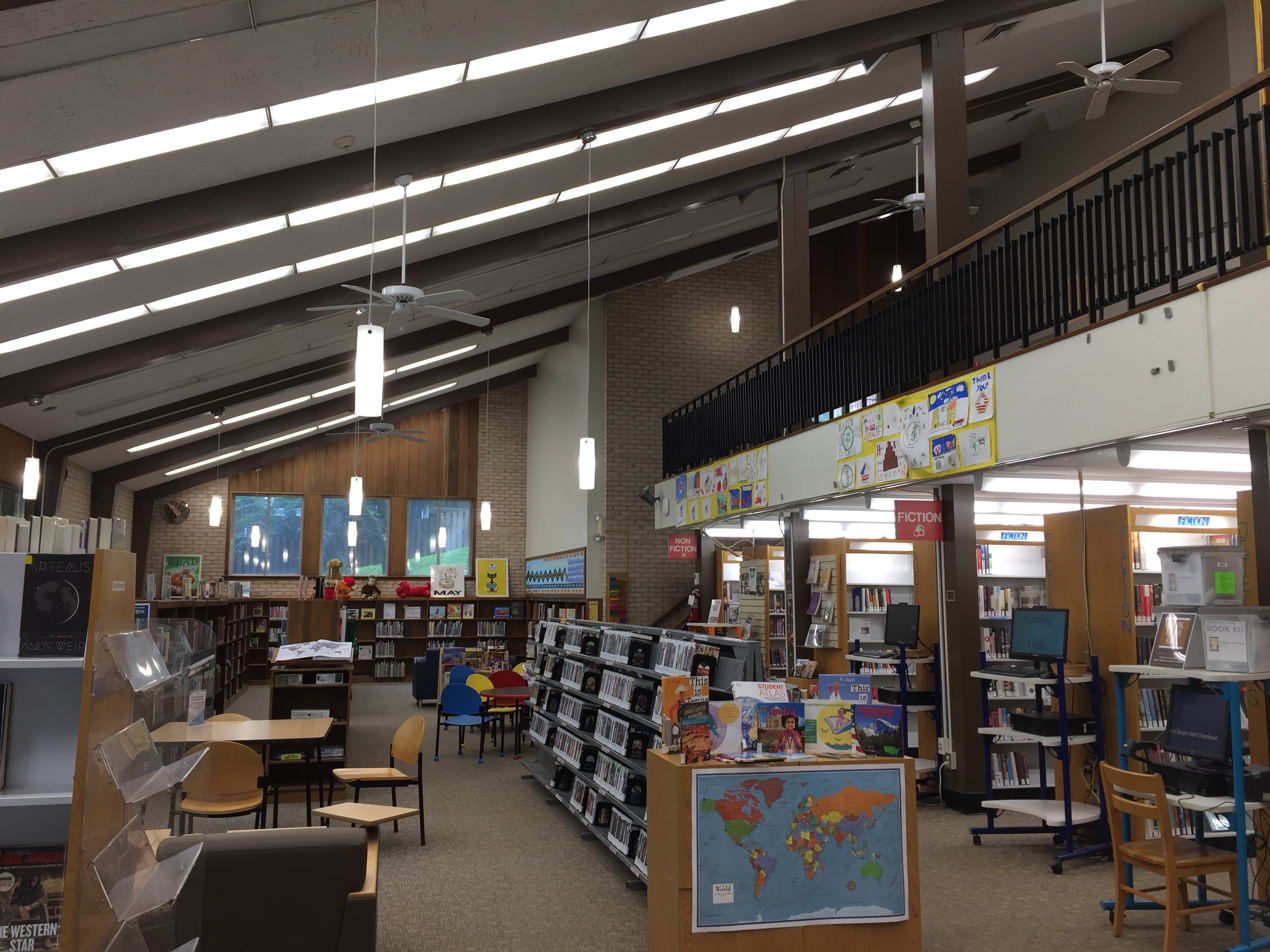
Cherrydale Branch Library

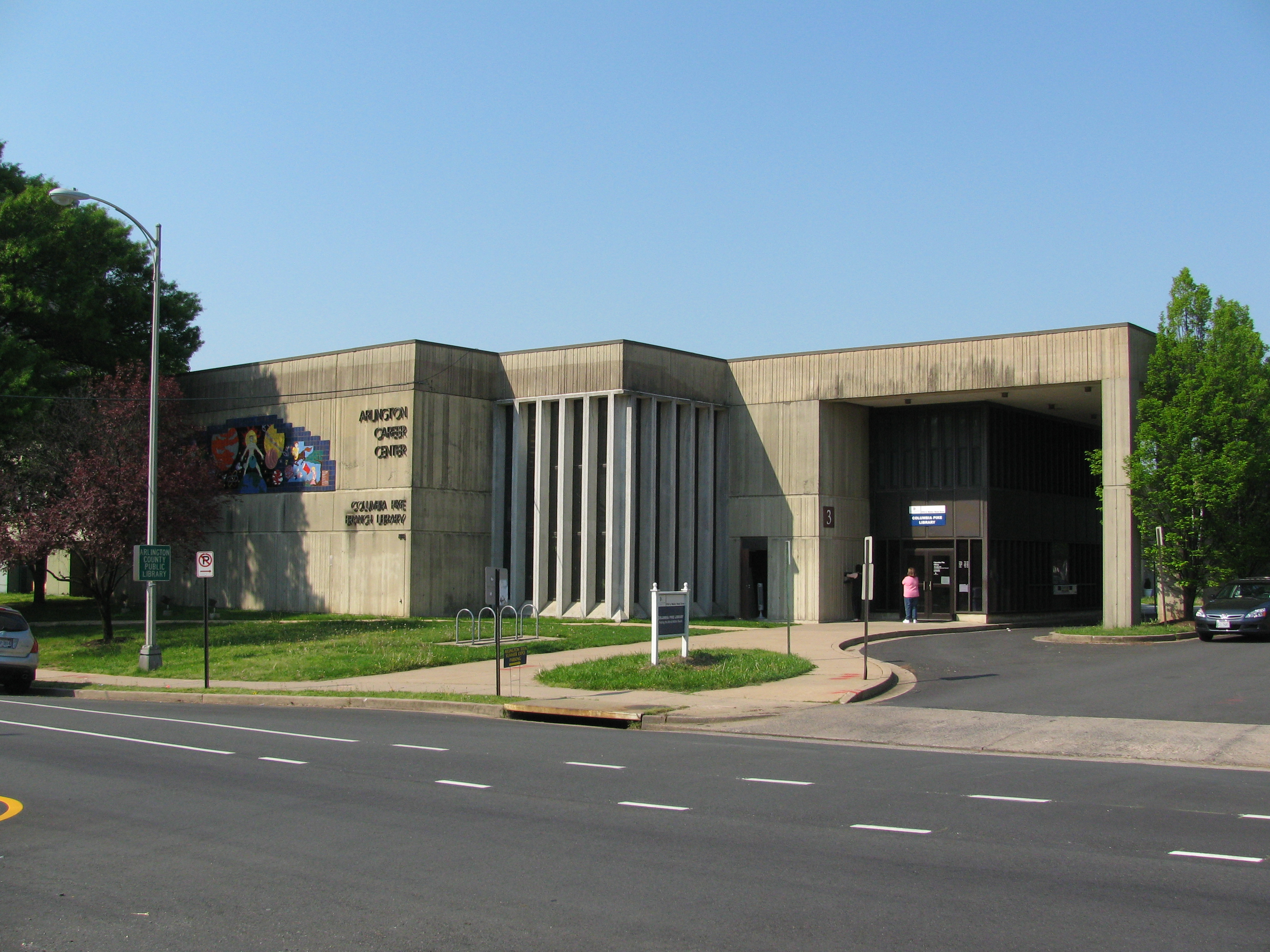
Columbia Pike Branch Library

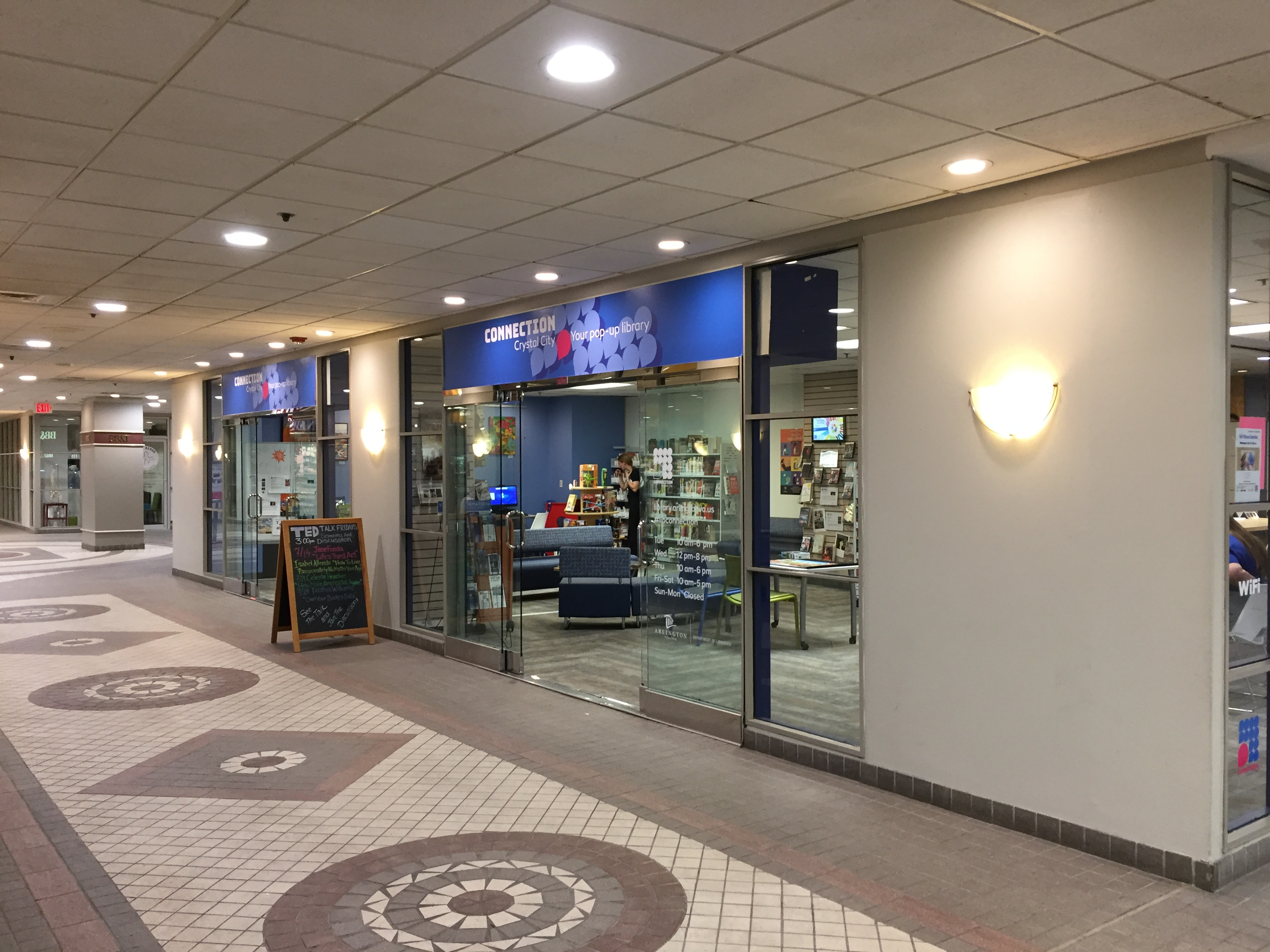
Connection Crystal City Library

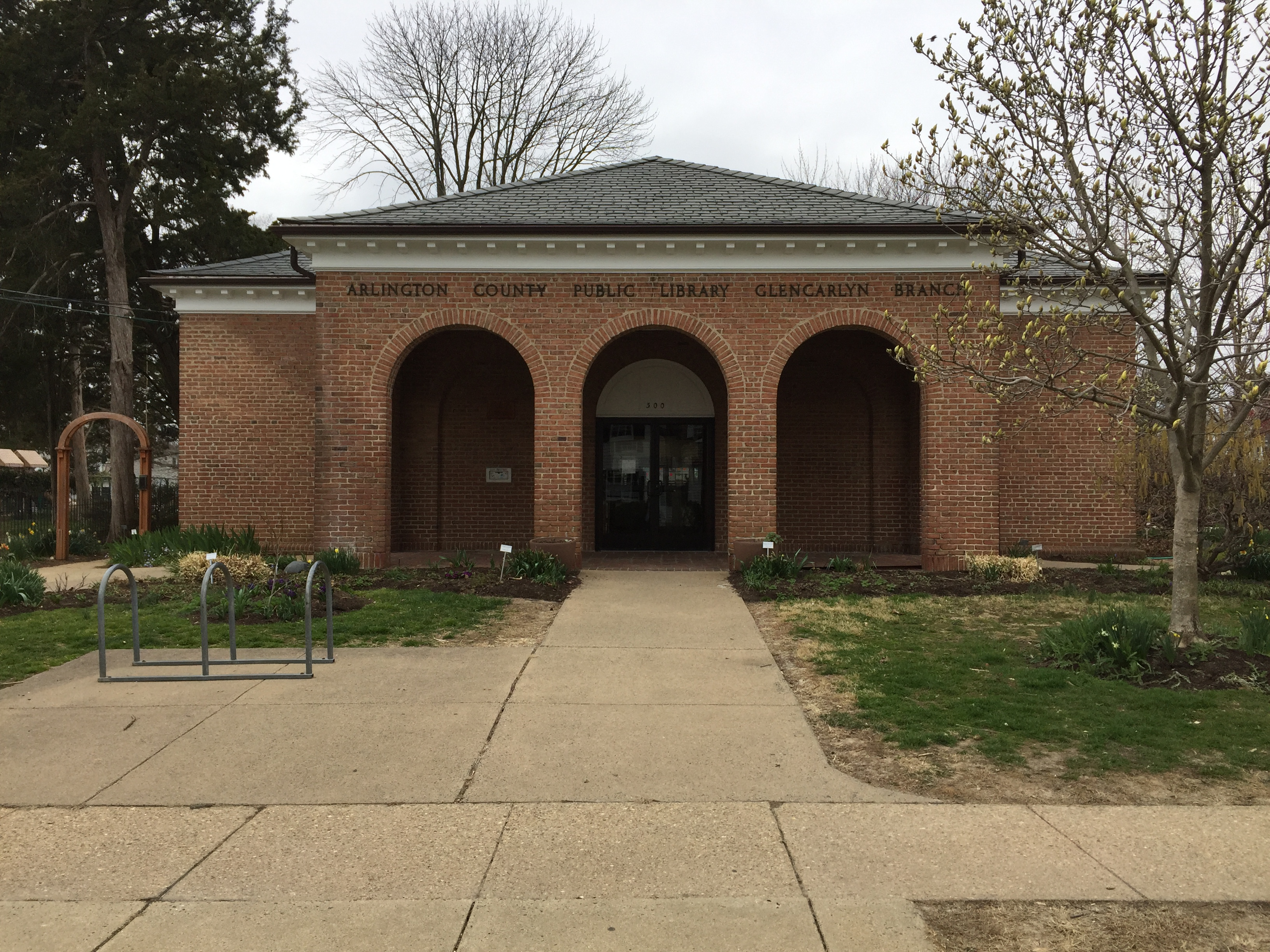
Glencarlyn Branch Library

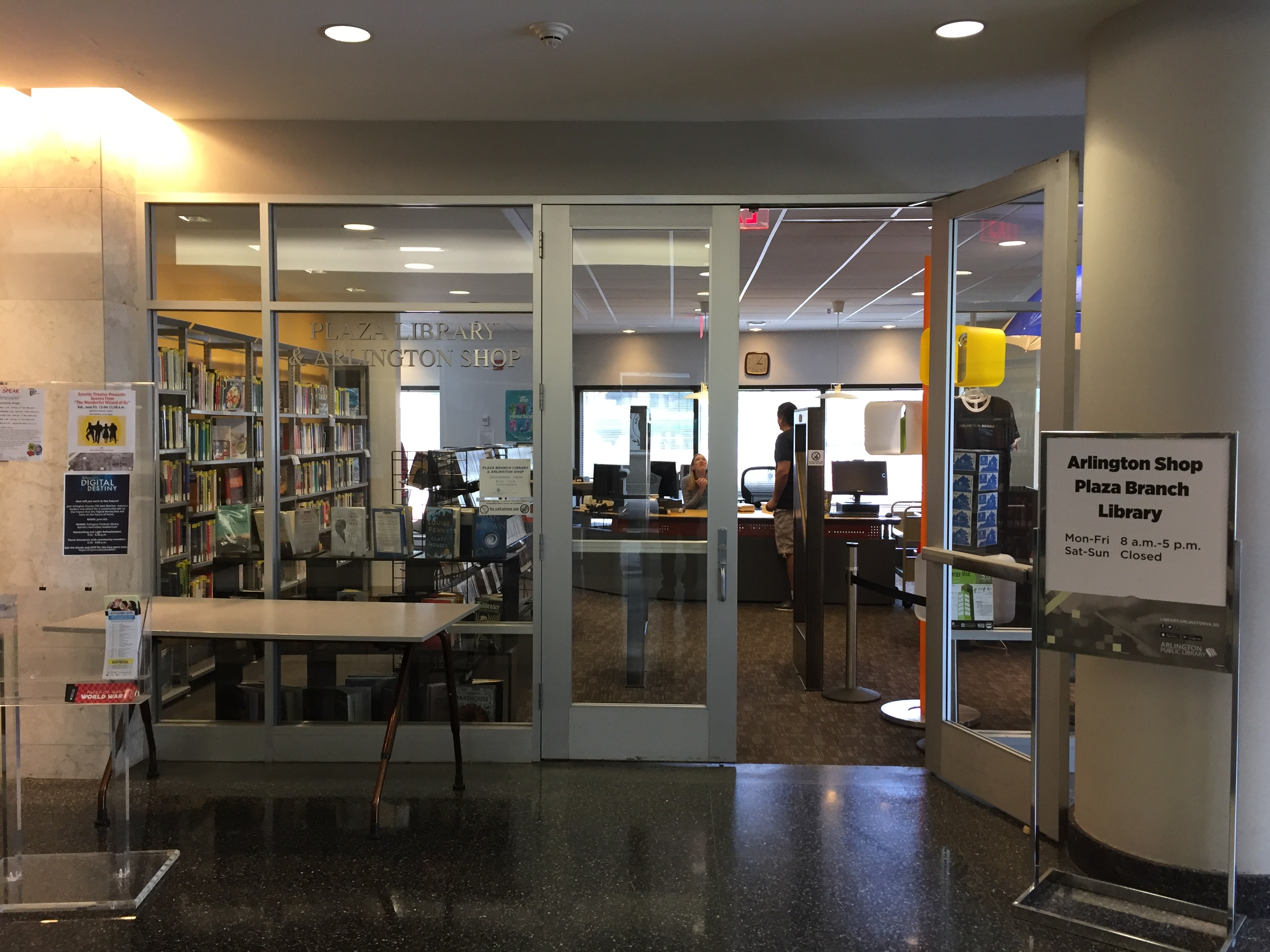
Plaza Branch Library

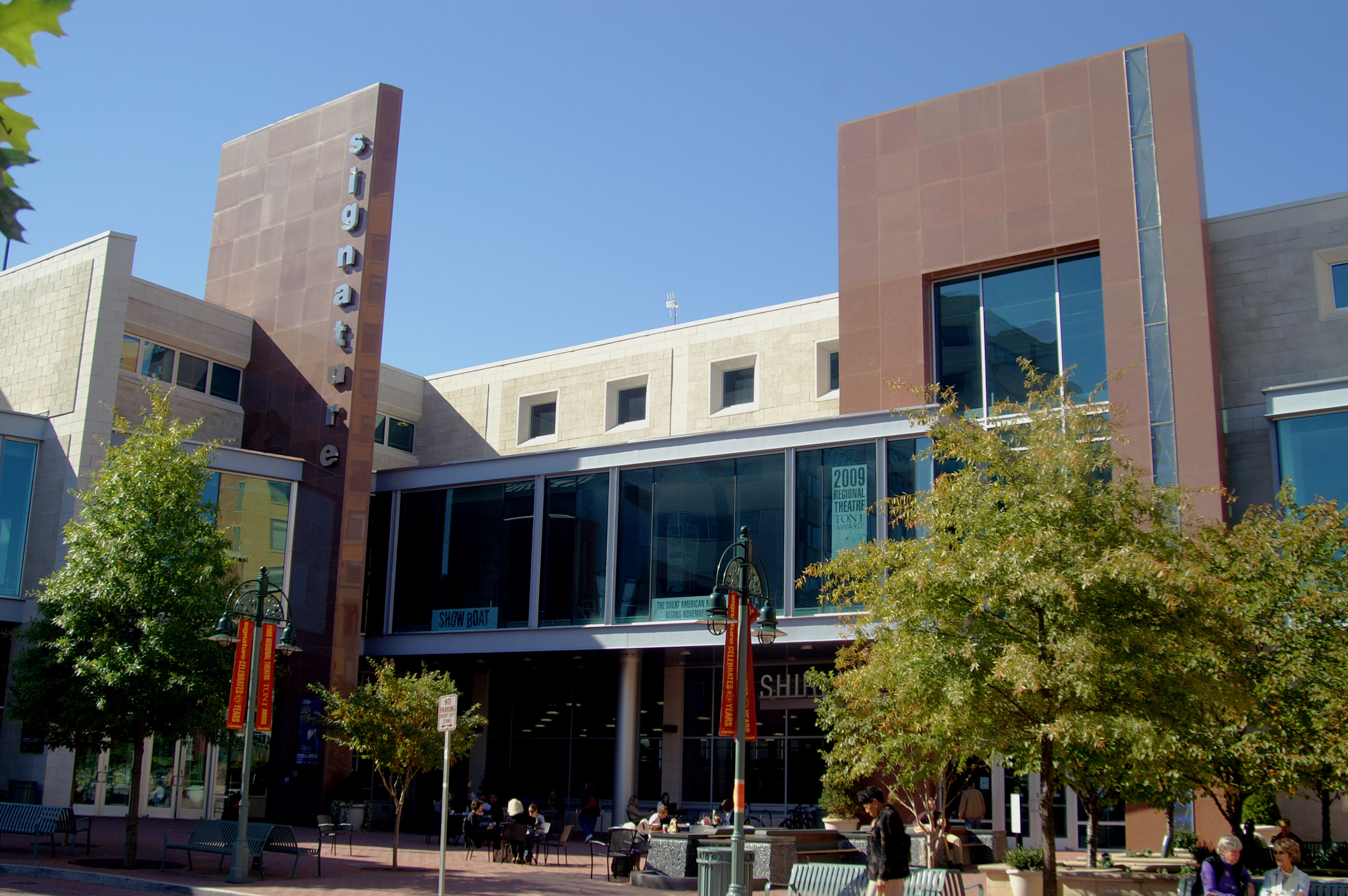
Shirlington Branch Library

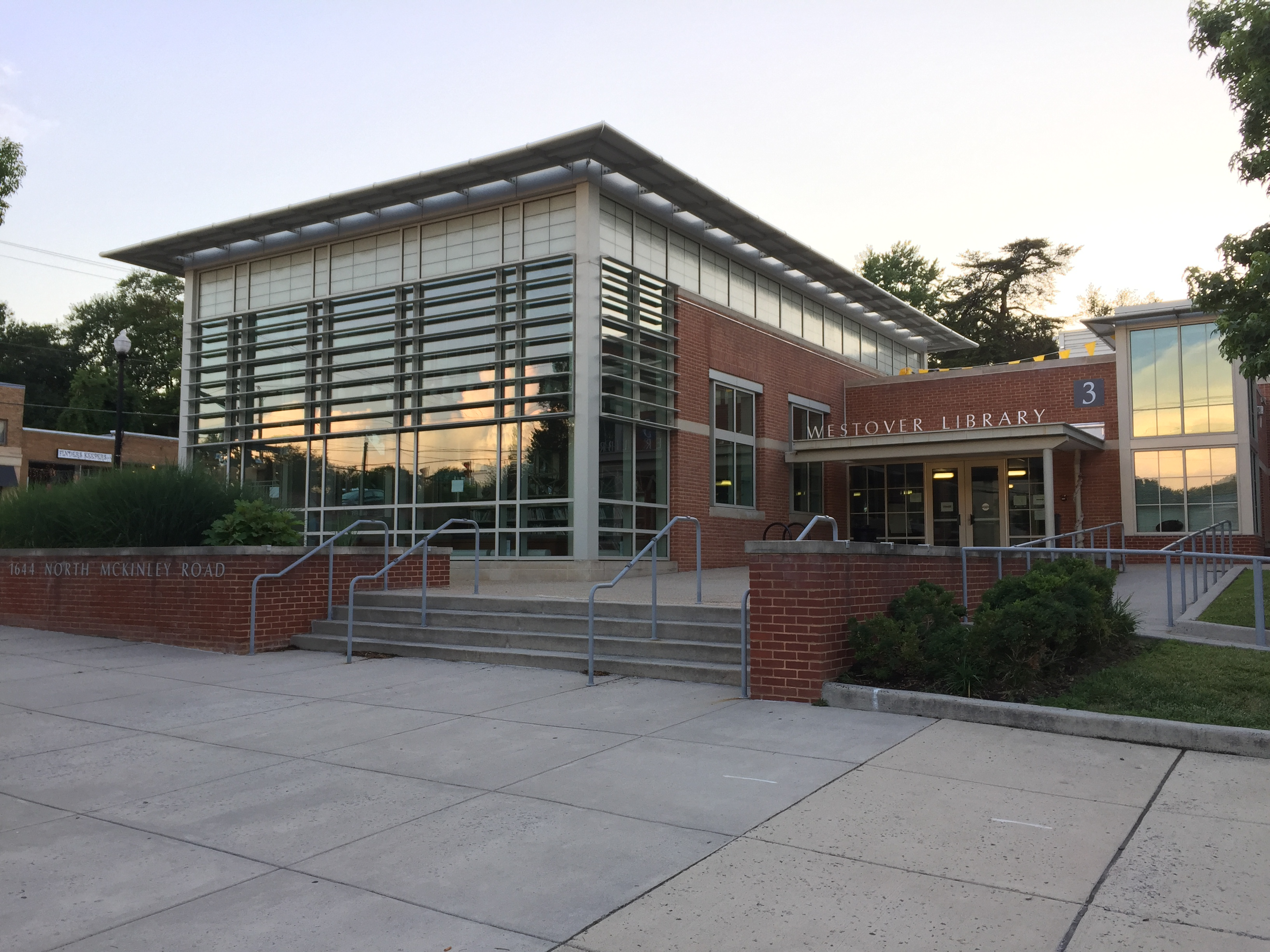
Westover Branch Library

The Arlington Public Library is a public library system located in Arlington County, Virginia. The library system includes nine locations that serve 214,373 people.

It began as a library in the Glencarlyn community in the late 1800s. In 1923, the Burdett Library opened in after endowment by General Samuel S. Burdett, and the Cherrydale library opened with support from the Cherrydale League of Women's Voters as well as the Patrons League. In 1924, the Clarendon Library followed at Citizens Hall with support from the Educational Committee of the Women's Civic Club. In 1926, the Aurora Hills Library opened with support from the Jefferson District Women's Club. In 1930, the Columbia Pike Library opened with support from the Arlington Community Library Club.

In 1971, the library became the first in the Washington metropolitan area to have a video cassette system. In 1972, the Library of Congress made the library a "subregional library for the blind and physically handicapped." In 1981 a Kurzweil Reading Machine was added to the offered services. In 1993, an Arkenstone Open Book Reader was added. In 2000, eBooks were added.

== Service area ==
The Library System has a service area population of 214,373 with 1 central library and 8 branch libraries. The library system is within Region 5 of Virginia Library Association (VLA).

== History ==
=== Branch establishment ===
Arlington Public Library began in the late 1800s with a book collection stored for the Glencarlyn community at Carlin Hall that was run by the Young People's Library Association. In 1914, General Samuel Swinfin Burdett bequeathed the money to begin a public library in Glencarlyn, not to exceed $3,000. Burdett Library opened in 1923.

Also in 1923, the Cherrydale library was formed to operate in what was the Cherrydale School. The library was created by the Cherrydale League of Women's Voters and the Patrons League. Clarendon Library opened at Citizens Hall in 1924, it was started by the Educational Committee of the Women's Civic Club. Clarendon Library was closed in 1927 when Citizen's Hall was sold. It was reopened in 1928 at a new location.

In 1926, The Aurora Hills Library was started by the Jefferson District Women's Club. In 1928, the Aurora Hills Garden Club took over the Aurora Hills Library.

In 1930, the Arlington Community Library Club restored a garage near Patrick Henry Elementary to create the Columbia Pike Library.

On June 26, 1944, Henry L. Holmes library becomes the official "colored" branch of the library system. It closed in 1950.

Fairlington Branch Library opens in January 1948. It later becomes the Shirlington branch.

In 1947, funding was approved by the county for create a branch in Westover. The library opened in January 1949.

The creation of Central Library was approved by the county in 1958, building began in 1960, and the library opened in 1961. Additions to the building began in 1966 and continued until 1968.

=== Governing history ===
Arlington District Library Association began in 1928 as an alliance of 20 local organizations. In 1936, the Department of Libraries was established through the Arlington County Board. The Department of Libraries was set to be run by a County Librarian. Prior to this, the libraries received little financial support from the local government and were run solely by volunteers, mostly women. At the time, the library system had five libraries: Arlington Community, Aurora Hills, Cherrydale, Clarendon, and Glencarlyn. The Arlington County Library Association was also established in 1936. It was disbanded in 1943. The Virginia State Library began giving funds to Arlington Public Library in 1943.

By 1937, the first County Librarian was selected, Eleanor Leonard. She served as County Librarian until October 1939. Helen L. Phillips became the next County Librarian in 1939 and serves until her marriage in 1940. Frances Henke took on the position for a few months before going into the Army Library Service. In 1941, Mildred G. Blattner became the County Librarian. She remained in the position until 1957, when she retired after 16 years.

In November 1954, Jane B. Nida became the Assistant Director of Libraries. Nida moved into the Director of Libraries position in 1957 after Blattner retired. Nida remained in the position until she retired in 1980. Leila Saunders became the Library Director in 1980 after Nida retired. Charles M. Brown became the Library Director in 1986 after Saunders retired. He remained in the position until 1994 when he resigned. Barbara Donnellan became Acting Director until 1995 when Ann M. Friedman became the Library Director. Friedman retired in 2006.

Diane Kresh became the Library director in 2006 and continues to be the Library Director of Arlington Public Library.

=== Programs ===
The "talking books" program began in 1968. In 1971, Arlington Public Library is the first library in the Washington D.C. area to have a video cassette system, located at Central Library. Library of Congress made Arlington Public Library a Subregional Library for the Blind and Physically Handicapped in 1972. In 1981, a Kurzweil Reading Machine for the blind became a part of the Central Library. In 1993, the library obtained a grant from the Virginia Department of the Blind to put an Arkenstone Open Book Reader in Central Library.

On July 1, 1980, Arlington Public Library became part of the Metropolitan Council of Government's library borrowing program that allows patrons from Washington D.C. area libraries to have reciprocal borrowing privileges with partnering institutions in the area.

In 1985, the library system begins using a computerized cataloging system and a computer-assisted information retrieval system. The library catalog system becomes available at all locations and the Arlington public high schools in 1988.

In 2000, eBooks become available through the library's website followed by eAudiobooks in 2004.

Arlington Reads community reading program began in 2006. The program was given a 2011 Outstanding Achievement in Local Government Innovation Award from the Alliance for Innovation. The program was rewarded as an Outstanding Adult Program by Virginia Public Library Directors Association in 2011.

==== Friends of the Arlington Public Library ====
The Friends of the Arlington Public Library (FOALs) was founded in 1962 to support the library system. This group held their first book sale in April 1976.

== Branches ==
- Aurora Hills Branch
- Central Library
- Cherrydale Branch
- Columbia Pike Branch
- Glencarlyn Branch
- Plaza Branch
- Shirlington Branch
- Westover Branch

== Nearby public library systems ==
- Alexandria Public Library
- Fairfax County Public Library
- District of Columbia Public Library
- Montgomery County Public Libraries
- Prince George's County Memorial Library System
