= Arlington Ridge Road =

Street in Arlington County, Virginia

Arlington Ridge Road (originally known as Mount Vernon Avenue) is a street through residential areas and business districts in Arlington County, Virginia in the United States. South Arlington Ridge Road is roughly 1.5 miles in length and extends from Prospect Hill Park/Army-Navy Drive in the north to Glebe Road and Four Mile Run creek in the south. As it crosses the creek it turns into Mount Vernon Avenue. Arlington Ridge Road was first constructed in 1840, and formerly extended north through Arlington National Cemetery to Rosslyn, Virginia near Francis Scott Key Bridge and the Potomac River.

Arlington Ridge Road was a single street from 1840 to 1966. After the closure of the central portion of the road, two sections were created: South Arlington Ridge Road, and North Arlington Ridge Road. The northern road began at Lee Boulevard (now known as Arlington Boulevard) and proceeded north along what is now Wilson Boulevard to 19th Street North. It incorporated a portion of what was informally known as Oil Plant Road (also known as "Oil Road"). North Arlington Ridge Road was eliminated in the early 1960s when interchanges and connections for the Theodore Roosevelt Bridge were constructed.

== History of the name ==
=== Creating a county ===
At the time of European encounter, the inhabitants of the area that became Arlington County were the Doeg, an Algonquian-speaking sub-group of the Powhatan tribal confederation. Colonists from England usurped Native American title to the land, and began creating their own political divisions on the area in the 1600s. York County, Virginia, was created by the Virginia General Assembly in 1634, displacing Native American claims to the land. Northumberland County was carved out of York County in 1648, Westmoreland County from Northumberland County in 1653, Stafford County, Virginia from Westmoreland County in 1664, Prince William County out of Stafford County (and a portion of King George County) in 1731, and Fairfax County in 1742 from Prince William County.

In 1790, Congress enacted the Residence Act, which provided for the seat of the United States federal government to be sited on the Potomac River. George Washington chose the site of Washington, D.C., in 1791. Subsequently, that portion of Fairfax County consisting of modern Arlington County and the city of Alexandria, Virginia, became part of the District of Columbia. Congress enacted the District of Columbia Organic Act in 1801. The Organic Act placed the incorporated towns of Washington, D.C.; Georgetown, D.C. and Alexandria, Virginia, under the direct control of Congress. Unincorporated territory in the District of Columbia north of the Potomac River was organized into Washington County; that territory in the District south of the river was organized into Alexandria County (after the town of Alexandria).

The area would have remained known as Alexandria County had it not been for the creation of Arlington Estate, which lent its name not only to the soon-to-be-built road but also to the county itself.

=== Creating Arlington Estate ===
In 1774, John Parke Custis (oldest heir in a wealthy Maryland family which owned extensive estates) married Eleanor Calvert (daughter of one of the richest men in Maryland). John and Eleanor Custis lived at Mount Vernon with John's mother, Martha Washington, and his foster father, George Washington. The Custises had two children, George Washington Parke Custis ("G.W.P.") and Eleanor ("Nelly") Custis. John purchased an 1,100-acre (4,500,000 m^{2}) tract of forested land on the Potomac River north of the town of Alexandria in 1778. John Parke Custis died on November 5, 1781. His widow, Eleanor, married Dr. David Stuart in 1783, and the Stuarts moved to Mount Vernon where George and Martha Washington helped to raise G.W.P. and Nelly. Under the terms of Custis' will, George Washington received a life estate in two-thirds of Custis' property. G.W.P. would inherit only upon Washington's death. The remaining one-third went to Martha Washington.

George Washington died on December 14, 1799, and G.W.P. inherited his father's estate. Martha Washington died in 1802, allowing G.W.P. to inherit the rest of his father's property as well as nearly all of George Washington's holdings as well. This included what later became the Arlington estate. G.W.P. moved out of Mount Vernon and into an existing four-room house on some marshy flats on the Potomac River estate. In 1802, G.W.P. began construction on the north wing of Arlington House. He named his new estate "Mount Washington" after his foster father.

Custis' estate consisted of highly varied topography. Near the river, the land was flat and lush. But about 1,500 feet (460 m) inland, a ridge ran roughly parallel to the shoreline. Another 300 feet (91 m) or so beyond the ridge, the land rose sharply by nearly 100 feet (30 m) to reach the Virginia uplands. Mount Washington was too small to be self-supporting as a working farm, so Custis sought to make Arlington into a family seat — complete with a large park, a forest, and gardens. Farming occurred primarily on the lush lowland by the river, where G.W.P. engaged in experimental farming and animal husbandry. G.W.P. put 57 African slaves to work building log cabins for themselves on the lowlands and working the farm. From 1804 to about 1840, Custis worked to create what he called "the Park". Patterned on the English landscape park, "the Park" was bordered by the carriage drive on the south, native forest on the north, uplands and the house on the west, and the ridge in the east.

In late 1803 or early 1804, Custis hired local architect George Hadfield to design the remainder of his mansion on the hill. Construction had already begun on the south wing of the mansion by this time, so Hadfield contributed mainly to the center section. Unfortunately, the central part of the mansion remained unbuilt until 1815 due to a lack of funds.

On July 7, 1804, G.W.P. Custis married Mary Lee Fitzhugh, daughter of one of the wealthiest landowners in northern Virginia. Shortly after their marriage, the Custises began to refer to their estate and home as Arlington rather than Mount Washington — an homage to Arlington in the United Kingdom from whence his family emigrated.

== Building Arlington Ridge Road ==
=== First roads in the area ===
The first known road through what would eventually become Arlington County was a barely-cleared path through the forest along what is now the Henry G. Shirley Memorial Highway. Created in 1743, it began near Glebe Road and continued roughly northeast until it reached the ferry landing near what is now Virginia State Route 110.

G.W.P. Custis began operating a ferry between his estate and the growing city of Washington, D.C., in 1807. In 1808, the Washington and Alexandria Turnpike was authorized by Congress, and constructed on Custis' land near the river bank. This toll road extended from the Long Bridge (south of the estate) down to Alexandria.

=== Arlington Ridge Road ===
In 1840, Custis agreed to allow a second road to be cut across his land. This road was covered in gravel, rather than dirt like the turnpike. It began in the south near the junction of what is now Virginia State Route 27 and Shirley Highway, and continued in a nearly straight line north-northwest until it reached what is now the intersection of North Fort Myer Drive and U.S. Route 29. For many years, this gravel road was known as Mount Vernon Avenue, but it later became known as Arlington Ridge Road after the great estate through which it passed.

The nature of Arlington Estate changed abruptly in 1861. G.W.P. Custis died on October 10, 1857, leaving the estate to his daughter, Mary. She had married United States Army officer Robert E. Lee on June 30, 1831. At the outbreak of the American Civil War, Robert E. Lee resigned his commission and joined the army of the Confederate States of America. The U.S. Army occupied Arlington on May 24, 1861. The estate served as headquarters for a portion of the regional defenses of Washington, D.C., and the Arlington Line of forts lined the upland: Forts Cass, Craig, DeKalb, Tillinghast, and Woodbury. South of the estate, north of what is now Overlook Park, Fort Albany was built on the side of Arlington Ridge Road. Extensive horse and mule corrals were built east of the road (near the current Visitors Center and parking lots and the area just south of them). In August 1862, Fort Whipple (now known as Fort Myer) was constructed in the northwest part of the estate. Freedmen's Village, a housing development for escaped slaves ("contraband") and free blacks, was constructed in May 1863 the very southern part of the estate immediately west of Arlington Ridge Road. East across Arlington Ridge Road from Freedmen's Village was Hell's Bottom, a 37.5-acre (152,000 m^{2}) site at the foot of the Long Bridge. A horse racing track occupied the bottom.

== History of Arlington Ridge Road within Arlington National Cemetery ==
=== 1800s ===
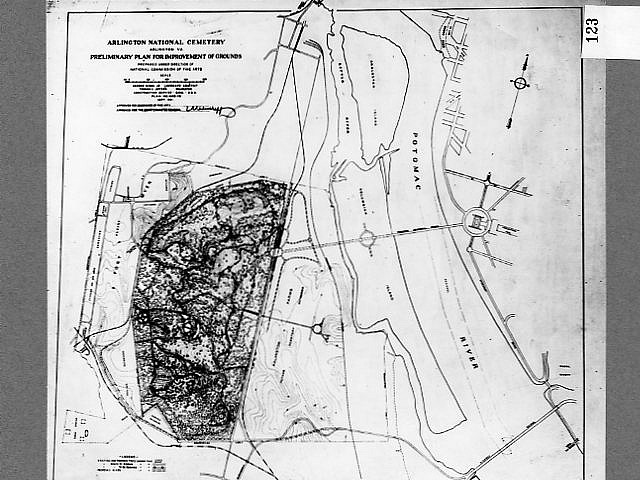
1921 map showing Arlington Ridge Road extending from Glebe Road north along the eastern border of Arlington National Cemetery to 19th Street North in Rosslyn.

With a desperate need to bury war dead, the United States government authorized the burial of dead at Arlington Estate on June 15, 1864, effectively creating Arlington National Cemetery. But not all of the estate was used for burials. Although some burials occurred around Arlington House, most of the dead were buried in what is now sections 27, 29, 41, and 42 in the far northern part of the estate and in sections 1 and 13 (the "Field of the Dead") in the west-northwestern part of the estate.

The entirety of Arlington Estate remained under the control of the United States Department of War. About 900 acres (3,600,000 m^{2}) of the 1,100-acre (4,500,000 m^{2}) estate were not being used by the cemetery, and 400 acres (160 ha) of this land was being cultivated by former slaves at Freedman's Village, who farmed it as subsistence farmers and grew fruits, vegetables, hay, and grain for consumption at nearby Fort Whipple.

In February 1867, Congress passed legislation requiring all military cemeteries to be surrounded by a fence. Construction immediately began on a fence composed of red sandstone taken from Seneca Quarry in Maryland. This boundary wall was built along Arlington Ridge Road, making the street the de facto eastern border of the cemetery.

In 1887, John A. Commerford, the Superintendent of Arlington National Cemetery, asked the Quartermaster General of the United States Army to close Freedman's Village because he believed that the Village's residents had cut down Cemetery trees for use as firewood. In addition, neighbors were complaining about crime in the Village, which they considered to have become a financial burden to the community. The Quartermaster General and the Secretary of War approved Commerford's request shortly thereafter. However, some Village residents remained in their homes until 1900. The area then became part of the Cemetery, expanding the Cemetery's boundaries.

The boundary wall having not yet been completed, it was now extended along Arlington Ridge Road south to the old estate boundary and then west toward Fort Myer. This construction occurred in fits, and was not complete until 1897.

The Washington, Alexandria, and Mount Vernon Railway, an electric streetcar company, built its East Arlington branch to Arlington National Cemetery in 1895. This branch of the electric railway traveled parallel to and just east of Arlington Ridge Road (also known at the time as the Georgetown & Alexandria Road) along much of its route.

=== Road's role in shaping The Pentagon ===
Congress turned over the 400 acres (1,600,000 m^{2}) of the old Arlington Estate east of Arlington Ridge Road to the United States Department of Agriculture (USDA) in 1900. This had first been proposed by USDA in 1880, but nothing came of the request. The USDA Arlington Experimental Farm was constructed on the site, and the lush lowlands remained under the control of USDA until 1940.

By the 1930s, a middle-class black neighborhood known as Queen City had grown up west of Arlington Ridge Road and south of Columbia Pike.

In September 1940, as part of the American mobilization effort prior to World War II, the War Department proposed construction of a massive new headquarters on the site of the USDA Experimental Farm. The original site of the structure was bounded by Arlington Ridge Road and Memorial Drive. This dictated that, for the building to occupy as much land as possible, the new structure should be pentagonal. Secretary of the Interior Harold L. Ickes and United States Commission of Fine Arts chairman Gilmore David Clarke both considered the site inappropriate, and convinced President Franklin D. Roosevelt to not only halve the size of the proposed building but also shift the site to that of the inadequate and dangerous Washington-Hoover Airport (which the government was trying to close anyway). The construction of the Pentagon led to the razing of Queen City.

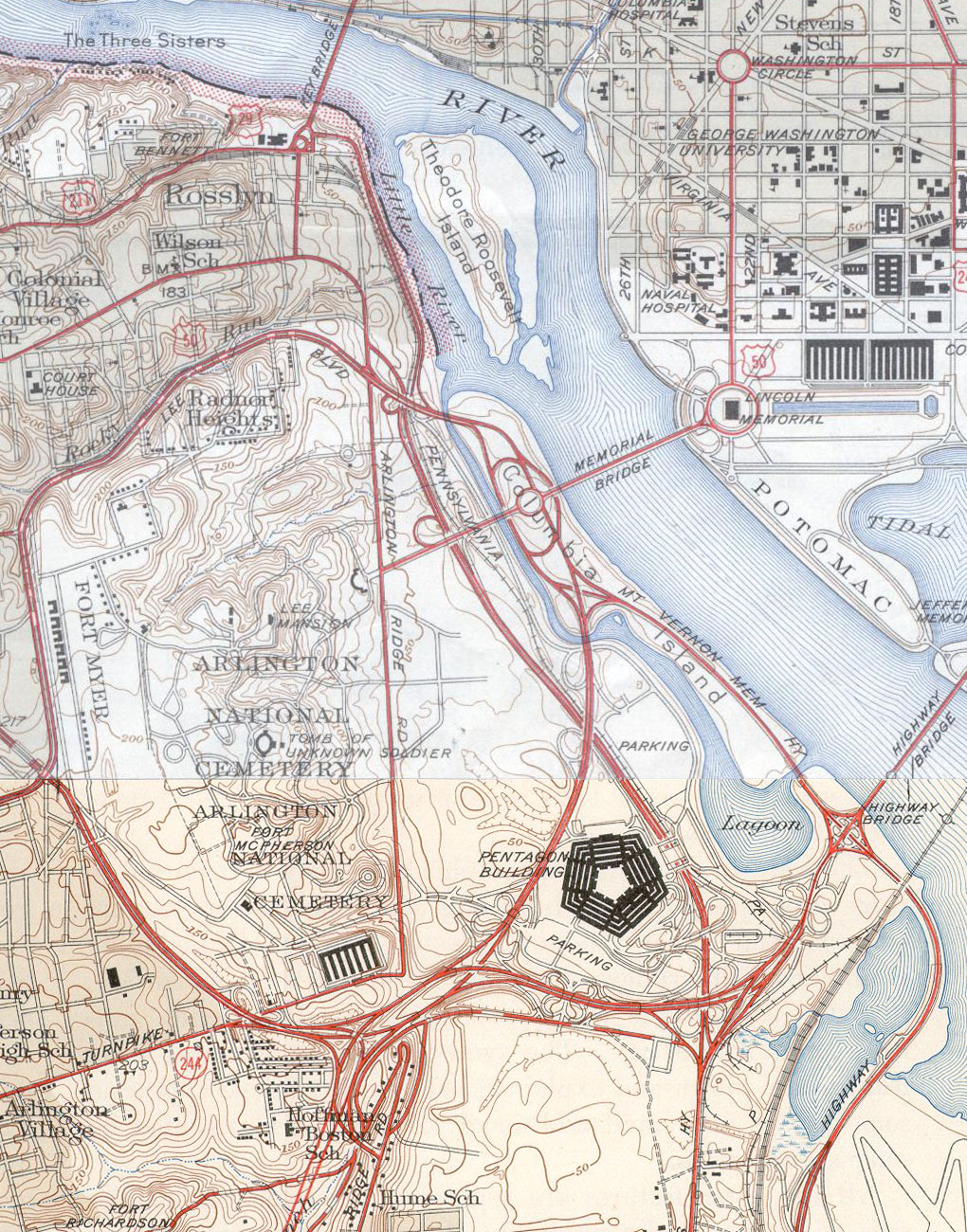
1945 map showing Arlington Ridge Road after construction of the Pentagon road network.

During World War II, additional changes were made to Arlington Ridge Road and the surrounding area. The north end of the USDA Experimental Farm now became temporary housing for women war workers. At first, the southern acreage was used as campgrounds for inductees being trained at Fort Myer. But temporary buildings were soon constructed there, too. They housed the U.S. Army Company Headquarters and leadership of the newly created Women's Army Corps, and was later the headquarters of the 10th Cavalry Regiment. In time, the entire former experimental farm became known as the Arlington Cantonment. With the large influx of workers at the Arlington Cantonment and The Pentagon, Congress enacted legislation creating a warren of roads, known as the Pentagon road network, to greatly expand commuter access to and from the area. While Arlington Ridge Road remained connected to Glebe Road, the street was severed from its southern segment by Shirley Memorial Highway. This created North and South Arlington Ridge Road.

=== Elimination of North Arlington Ridge Road ===
The construction of the Pentagon road network drew most of the traffic away from North Arlington Ridge Road. Additional changes came after 1947, when Congress appropriated money to purchase the Nevius Tract (now Arlington Ridge Park). This triangular area, bounded today by North Marshall Drive, North Meade Street, and Arlington Boulevard, had been purchased by private individuals in the 1930s to keep developers from building high-rise structures on it. They sold it to the federal government in 1947. Arlington Ridge Road cut off the eastern third of the tract. In the booming Rosslyn business district, three office buildings were built on the road in the mid-1960s. But it wasn't the integral street it used to be. The road was not removed from Arlington Ridge Park until 1971. Most of North Arlington Ridge Road was eliminated in the early 1960s when interchanges and connections for the Theodore Roosevelt Bridge were constructed. A short segment of the road just north of North Marshall Drive was turned into an access road for the park. The road was closed June 1, 1971, and demolition began shortly thereafter.

The closure of that portion of the street north of North Marshall Drive meant that little reason existed for keeping the rest of North Arlington Ridge open. Most drivers no longer used the road to access Arlington Memorial Bridge, preferring to use the highways to the east. A plan to close the road was first raised in early 1966. Arlington County officials were outraged, and pledged to go to court to stop it. The rationale for closing the road was that Arlington National Cemetery was running out of burial space. It needed to expand into the former experimental farm/cantonment area east of the road, but officials worried that traffic on the road would interrupt the dignity of military funerals and endanger pedestrians. The Army suggested keeping the road open only during rush hour, but later backed off this plan. Since the road was on federal property, Arlington County officials had little say over its closure. The National Capital Planning Commission approved the closure on July 22, and scheduled it for October 1, 1966.

Although closed, the road continued to exist at least into 1968. On February 6 of that year, Martin Luther King Jr., Roman Catholic Bishop James P. Shannon, Reverend Ralph Abernathy, Rabbi Maurice Eisendrath, and Rabbi Abraham Joshua Heschel led 2,000 people down Arlington Ridge Road in a protest against the Vietnam War. As of 2013, the cemetery's winding Eisenhower Avenue largely follows the path of the straight Arlington Ridge Road.

== South Arlington Ridge Road ==
South Arlington Ridge Road remained intact, however, and underwent little change during most of its history. It remained a four-lane street passing through light retail and residential districts in the Arlington Ridge community. The Little Tea House, a local landmark, was located at 1301 South Arlington Ridge Road. It hosted a large number of famous individuals, such as Amelia Earhart, Oliver Wendell Holmes Jr., and Eleanor Roosevelt. It opened in 1920 and was demolished in 1963 to make way for an apartment building.

The street was heavily traveled despite its largely residential character. In March 1983, residents of the area petitioned the Arlington County Board to reduce the width of the street from four lanes to two in an attempt to slow traffic. After a brief study, the board approved the experiment on July 9, 1983. The four-month test began on August 2, and ended November 15. The experiment proved successful, and Arlington Ridge Road was narrowed to two lanes between South Meade Street and 28th Street South/South June Street, which also allowed for the creation of sidewalks and grass boulevards between the sidewalks and roadway.

Arlington Ridge Road continues south into Alexandria as Mt. Vernon Avenue, where it forms the main thoroughfare through the Arlandria and Del Ray neighborhoods.

=== Current notable structures and cultural mentions ===
The Gunston Arts Center and Arlington Historical Society Museum are both located on South Arlington Ridge Road. In 1891, the Hume School was built on Arlington Ridge Road to serve elementary school-age children in the area. It closed in 1956, but was such a landmark that local citizens successfully petitioned the state to preserve it. The Hume School was added to the National Register of Historic Places in June 1979.

Arlington Ridge Road also plays a part in author Annie Solomon's 2006 spy thriller novel Blackout, and the opening shots of the 1987 murder mystery film No Way Out feature a long helicopter shot that travels along Arlington Ridge Road.

== Bibliography ==
- Aiken, Charles Curry and Kane, Joseph Nathan. The American Counties: Origins of County Names, Dates of Creation, Area, and Population Data, 1950-2010. Lanham, Md.: Scarecrow Press, 2013.
- Bryan, Wilhelmus Bogart. A History of the National Capital: From Its Foundation Through the Period of the Adoption of the Organic Act. New York: Macmillan, 1914.
- Carroll, James. Crusade: Chronicles of an Unjust War. New York: Henry Holt, 2004.
- Chase, Enoch Aquila. "The Arlington Case: George Washington Custis Lee against the United States of America." Records of the Columbia Historical Society. 31/32: 1930.
- Connery, William S. Civil War: Northern Virginia, 1861. Charleston, S.C.: The History Press, 2011.
- Cultural Landscape Program. Arlington House: The Robert E. Lee Memorial Cultural Landscape Report. National Capital Region. National Park Service. U.S. Department of the Interior. Washington, D.C.: 2001.
- Dilworth, Richardson. Cities in American Political History. Washington, D.C.: CQ Press, 2011.
- Dodd, Anita L. and Lee, M. Amanda. Stafford County. Charleston, S.C.: Arcadia Publishing, 2007.
- Gutheim, Frederick Albert and Lee, Antoinette J. Worthy of the Nation: Washington, D.C., From L'Enfant to the National Capital Planning Commission. Baltimore: Johns Hopkins University Press, 2006.
- Hansen, Stephen A. Kalorama Triangle: The History of a Capital Neighborhood. Charleston, S.C.: History Press, 2011.
- Kaplan, Edward K. Spiritual Radical: Abraham Joshua Heschel in America, 1940-1972. New Haven, Conn.: Yale University Press, 2007.
- Kashuba, Melinda. Walking With Your Ancestors: A Genealogist's Guide to Using Maps and Geography. Cincinnati: Family Tree Books, 2005.
- Kretzschmar, William A. Handbook of the Linguistic Atlas of the Middle and South Atlantic States. Chicago: University of Chicago Press, 1994.
- Livingston, Mike. Newcomer's Handbook for Moving to and Living in Washington, D.C.: including Northern Virginia and Suburban Maryland. Portland, Ore.: First Books, 2006.
- Loth, Calder. The Virginia Landmarks Registers. 4th ed. Charlottesville, Va.: University of Virginia Press, 1999.
- Michael, John. Fort Myer. Charleston, S.C.: Arcadia Publishing, 2011.
- Office of Technology Assessment. An Assessment of the United States Food and Agricultural Research System. Washington, D.C.: u.S. Government Printing Office, 1981.
- Patterson, Catherine Wiltz. An American Odyssey: To Virginia, Kentucky, Indiana, and Beyond. Bloomington, Ind.: AuthorHouse, 2006.
- Perry, John. Mrs. Robert E. Lee: The Lady of Arlington. Colorado Springs, Colo.: Multnomah Books, 2001.
- Poole, Robert M. On Hallowed Ground: The Story of Arlington National Cemetery. New York: Walker & Co., 2009.
- Rose, Cornelia Bruère. Arlington County, Virginia: A History. Arlington County, Va.: Arlington Historical Society, 1976 .
- Sage, Linda C. Pigment of the Imagination: A History of Phytochrome Research. San Diego: Academic Press, 1992.
- Senate Appropriations Committee. Departments of State, Justice, and Commerce, the Judiciary, and Related Agencies Appropriations, 1963. Hearings on H.R. 12580. Part 2. 87th Cong., 2d sess. Washington, D.C.: U.S. Government Printing Office, 1962.
- Solomon, Annie. Blackout. New York: Warner Forever, 2006.
- Solomon, Mary Jane; Ruben, Barbara; and Aloisi, Rebecca. Insiders' Guide to Washington, D.C. Guilford, Conn.: Globe Pequot, 2007.
- Sutton, Robert K. Americans Interpret the Parthenon: The Progression of Greek Revival Architecture From the East Coast to Oregon: 1800-1860. Niwot, Colo.: University Press of Colorado, 1992.
- Swanton, John R. The Indian Tribes of North America. Washington, D.C.: Smithsonian Institution Press, 1952.
- Templeman, Eleanor Lee Reading. Arlington Heritage: Vignettes of a Virginia County. Arlington, Va.:Eleanor Lee Reading Templeman, 1959.
- United States Department of Agriculture. Agriculture Yesterday & Today. Washington, D.C.: U.S. Department of Agriculture, 1987.
- Vogel, Steve. The Pentagon: A History. New York: Random House, 2008.
- Wayland, John Walter. The Washingtons and Their Homes. Baltimore, Md.: Clearfield, 1944.
