= Arlington Ridge, Virginia =

- Neighborhood
- Arlington Ridge Community Sign

- Location of Arlington Ridge in Northern Virginia Arlington Ridge, Virginia (Virginia) Arlington Ridge, Virginia (the United States)
- Coordinates: 38°51′11″N 77°04′06″W
- Country: United States of America
- State: Virginia
- County: Arlington
- Time zone: UTC-5 (EST)
  - Summer (DST): UTC-4 (EDT)
- ZIP Codes: 22202
- Area code: 703
- Police District: 2D
- Parking Zones: 01, 1B, 1C
- Civic Associations: Arlington Ridge Civic Association
- Firestation: Station 5 – Jefferson District / Aurora Highlands
- Library: Aurora Hills Library
- Parks: 19th Road South Park; Fort Scott Park; Oakcrest Park; South Ives Street Park; James W. Haley Park; Prospect Hills Park

Arlington Ridge is a neighborhood in Arlington County, Virginia. It is bordered on the north by The Pentagon, on the west by the Army Navy Country Club, and on the south by Alexandria. The main thoroughfare is the eponymous Arlington Ridge Road, a mansion-lined boulevard that, due to its high elevation, offers views of Washington, D.C., and the surrounding areas.

Arlington Ridge is home to two historical points of interest, the Hume School, which has been named to the National Register of Historic Places and houses the Arlington Country Historical Society and Museum, and Fort Scott, an Arlington County Historic District that is currently the site of Fort Scott Park.

== Geography ==
A low rise above the adjoining terrain, Arlington Ridge ran from just above the city of Alexandria to a position northward directly across the Potomac from Georgetown. The ridge included land later leveled for construction of the Pentagon and Shirley Highway. Geologists believe the ridge may have been the shoreline of the Potomac during flood stage thousands of years ago.

== Hume School ==
The Hume School was built in 1891 and is the oldest school building in Arlington County, Virginia. An active school until 1958, it is now the home of the Arlington Historical Society. It is listed in the National Register of Historic Places.

== The Little Tea House ==
The Little Tea House Restaurant, located on Arlington Ridge Road, opened in 1920 and remained there until 1963, when it was demolished to make room for a high-rise apartment building. During its heyday, many famous people ate at the restaurant, including Eleanor Roosevelt, Amelia Earhart, and Oliver Wendell Holmes. Known for its lovely gardens and views, it was also one of the first places in Arlington, where racially mixed groups could meet. Gertrude Crocker, who started the restaurant, was active in women's issues throughout her life and started the restaurant so she could be independent and her own "boss." When Mrs. Crocker leased, and later sold, the business to Gertrude Allison, it became known for a period as Allison's Little Tea House.

A postcard produced for the Little Tea House described the restaurant with this caption:

1301 South Arlington Ridge Road. Reminiscent of early American days with its brass and copper antiques, its shelves of rare old cook books, its tinkling Swiss music box, Allison's Little Tea House has been devoted for the past quarter of a century to the art of gracious eating.

The only remaining remnant of the Little Tea House that is visible today is a small stone tower located at the intersection South Lynn Street, now used as a small maintenance building for an adjacent swimming pool. The stone tower is a reminder of a bygone era in this area. Today, countless pedestrians walk by in their neighborhood to reach the local shopping area of Pentagon City.

== Prospect Hill ==
Prospect Hill after the September 11 attacks

At the northern terminus of Arlington Ridge lies Prospect Hill, an Arlington County historic site. The sign at Prospect Hill reads:

The mansion which formerly stood here was built in 1841 by James Roach, a prosperous contractor who supplied most of the brick and stone used in the construction of the Aqueduct Bridge and Alexandria Canal (under construction 1833–1843) and the Alexandria, Loudoun, and Hampshire Railroad (under construction 1853–1859). His property, which extended to Roach’s Run, was ruined and vandalized during the construction of Fort Runyon and Fort Albany in 1861. His mansion was demolished in 1965.

Prospect Hill's vantage immediately overlooking the Pentagon (and the Washington, D.C., skyline beyond) makes it a popular location for photographers. After the September 11 attacks, this spot offered a clear view of the Pentagon's damaged side. Many of the pictures that appeared around the world showing the still smoldering Pentagon were taken from this spot. Immediately after the disaster, a makeshift memorial consisting of wreaths and flowers was also established here.

Prospect Hill's strategic elevation overlooking the Old Georgetown Road and the Green Valley made it an ideal location for a defensive post during the Civil War. Consequently, it was selected as the site for Fort Albany.

== Fort Albany ==
Located atop Prospect Hill was Fort Albany, a Civil War fort established as part of the defense of the national capital of Washington, D.C. during the war. Although no remains of the fort exist, the location is a designated Arlington County historic site. A sign at the former fort reads:

Immediately to the northwest stood Fort Albany, a bastioned earthwork built in May, 1861, to command the approach to the Long Bridge by way of the Columbia Turnpike. It had a perimeter of 429 yards and emplacements for 12 guns. Even after Forts Richardson and Craig were built, 1300 yards to the west and north respectively, the heavy guns of Fort Albany served to support them, and to dominate them if they were captured. The ground on which the Fort stood was cut away during the construction of the Henry G. Shirley Memorial Highway, in 1942.

== Fort Scott ==
Built by the Union Army in May 1861, Fort Scott was built as a detached lunette to guard the south flank of the defenses of Washington. It was named for General Winfield Scott, then General-in-Chief of the Army. One of many forts build to safeguard the capital, it was subsequently relegated to an interior position by the construction of the defenses of Alexandria about 1/4 miles to the west. The fort had a perimeter of 313 yards and emplacements for 8 guns.

The fort is designated as an Historic District.

== Revolutionary War ==
Separating the Arlington Ridge community from the Army Navy Country Club lies Army Navy Drive, formerly known as Old Georgetown Road.

In September 1781, Continental Army troops under the command of George Washington and French troops under General Rochambeau marched southward from New Jersey over this section of Old Georgetown Road en route to Yorktown, Virginia, where they defeated the British in the decisive Siege of Yorktown during the American Revolutionary War.

== Civil War ==
Arlington Ridge boasts several unique distinctions in the history of the Civil War:

- First piece of Confederate-occupied territory captured by the Union Army
- Longest-held Confederate territory during the course of the war
- Final encampment for much of the Union Army

=== Seizure of The Ridge ===
Because of its high elevation and close proximity to the national capital of Washington, D.C., which is a little over three miles from the then-uncompleted Washington Monument, Arlington Ridge offered a natural strategic point necessary for securing the defense of the capital. If Confederate Army troops had been able to secure the ridge, mortars would easily be able to shell the capital. On May 23, 1861, Virginia citizens voted three to one in favor of secession. At dawn the next day, May 24, Union troops crossed the Potomac to seize Arlington Heights.

To the south of the ridge, leading the 11th New York Zouave regiment, Col. Elmer Ephraim Ellsworth was charged with seizing Alexandria, Virginia. Advancing uncontested through the streets, Elssworth ordered some of his men to take the railroad station and a few others to secure the telegraph office. On the way, he espied a Confederate flag flying from the Marshall House Inn. Ellsworth and a group of others entered the inn and ran up the stairs to remove the flag. Ellsworth cut the flag down, however, on the way down the stairs, he was shot and killed by the owner of the inn, James W. Jackson. Jackson was subsequently shot and killed by Cpl. Francis E. Brownell, who was later rewarded for his actions.

To the north of the Ridge, Col. Orlando B. Wilcox led the 1st Michigan Regiment. Landing in what is now the area presently occupied by Arlington National Cemetery, Wilcox and his men quickly descended upon the Lee/Custis House, the estate owned by Gen. Robert E. Lee, who had resigned his commission from the Union Army only a few weeks earlier on April 20. Wilcox next advanced south and met up with Ellsworth's men to secure Arlington heights, completing the first successful campaign to recapture confederate territory during the war.

Once under federal control, Union engineers hastily began constructing a series of fortifications to protect the capital. These forts became the first line of defense for Washington, establishing the beginning of the so-called Arlington Line. At the southern end of this line, a fort was constructed on the highest point of The Ridge. This fort, named Fort Scott, is now the site of the current park that bears the same name.

=== Final encampment ===
Near the Civil War's end, May 23 and May 24, 1865, a two-day military parade was held in Washington, D.C. Nearly all of the major units of the Union Army participated in the parade, and they bivouacked on Arlington Ridge. Mustering-out commenced once the parade ended, which for many Union Army soldiers meant that the ridge was their last encampment during the war.

== Arlington Ridge Road ==
Formerly the Alexandria-Georgetown Road, Arlington Ridge Road currently extends from South Glebe Road to Army Navy Drive, which itself was formerly known as Old Georgetown Road. Prior to the construction of The Pentagon and Shirley Highway (later re-designated Interstate 395), Arlington Ridge Road was a major county thoroughfare that extended through to Rosslyn.

From the 1890s until the 1920s, the Northern Virginia electric railway operated trolleys in Arlington. One of the lines that made up this system, the East Arlington Branch Line, traveled along most of its route along a section of Arlington Ridge Road that is now within Arlington National Cemetery.

In January 1934, the Commissioner of Public Roads prepared a report on the situation for the National Capital Parks and Planning Commission. The report resulted in a plan for a system of arterial highways in the area that would, among other things, allow expansion and protection of the Arlington National Cemetery by elimination of the adjacent segment of Arlington Ridge Road, which at that time, constituted the eastern boundary of the Arlington National Cemetery. Although approved by the commission in 1934, little was done to realize the plan.

In March 1941, a revised general layout was prepared that was largely the same but also included a new route to the south, later known as the Shirley Highway. The section of Shirley Highway from VA-7 to the beginning of the Pentagon Road Network at Arlington Ridge Road, started out as a Virginia Department of Highways project. Development accelerated as the U.S. entered World War II, and the fate of Arlington Ridge Road was sealed when it was shortened to its present length.

A final reduction change came about in the 1980s when the remaining stretch of Arlington Ridge Road was reduced from four lanes to two, accompanied by installation of standard 4-foot sidewalks and grass easements.

== Zoned parking ==
The nearby urban development of Crystal City has large number of daily commuters. Either to avoid paying for parking, or because of lack of space, it was common for these commuters to park on residential streets in the nearby Arlington Ridge and Aurora Hills communities. This daily flood of out-of-town strangers into formerly tranquil and isolated neighborhoods caused many problems. Starting in 1968, the Arlington Ridge and Aurora Hills civic associations petitioned Arlington County for help with the situation. A zoned parking ordinance was established, the intent of which was:

to reduce hazardous traffic conditions resulting from the use of streets within areas zoned for residential uses for the parking of vehicles by persons using districts zoned for commercial or industrial uses . . .; to protect those districts from polluted air, excessive noise, and trash and refuse caused by the entry of such vehicles; to protect the residents of those districts from unreasonable burdens in gaining access to their residences; to preserve the character of those districts as residential districts; to promote efficiency in the maintenance of those streets in a clean and safe condition; to preserve the value of the property in those districts; and to preserve the safety of children and other pedestrians and traffic safety, and the peace, good order, comfort, convenience and welfare of the inhabitants of the County.

Crystal City successfully challenged these restrictions in court for many years. In 1977, a landmark decision by the United States Supreme Court settled the issue once and for all. (See ARLINGTON COUNTY BOARD v. RICHARDS, 1977, No. 76-1418.) As a result of this decision, communities nationwide are now able to preserve the peace and tranquility of their own neighborhood streets thanks to the activism of the people of Arlington Ridge and Aurora Hills.

== In popular culture ==
The opening sequence to the 1987 film No Way Out features a long aerial shot that begins on the National Mall, flies over The Pentagon, and then trails down Arlington Ridge Road to end at a house where Kevin Costner’s character is being held for questioning. Along with the more famous national landmarks, a clear shot of the Hume School is clearly visible in the sequence.

== See also ==
- Fort Albany
- Fort Scott
- Hume School
- List of Arlington County Historic Districts
