= Arlington Historical Museum =

Museum in Virginia, US

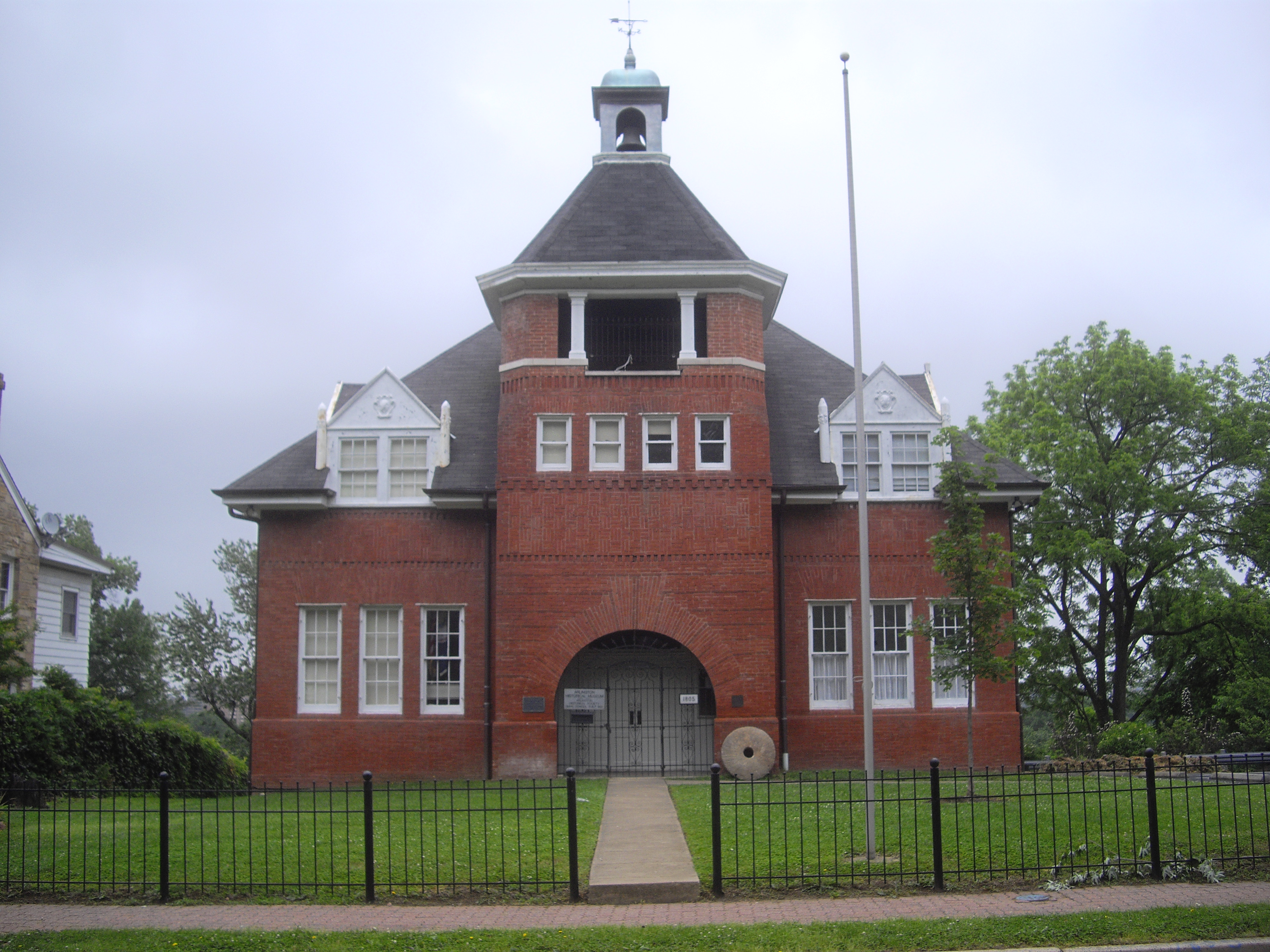
- Established: 1962
- Location: Arlington, Virginia
- Coordinates: 38°51′31″N 77°04′03″W
- Public transit access: , Pentagon City station
- Website: Arlington Historical Museum

The Arlington Historical Museum in Arlington, Virginia houses a comprehensive artifact collection on rotating display. Its exhibits interpret the history of the area from Captain John Smith's encounter with Algonquin Native Americans in 1608 to the near-present, including a section of the Pentagon wall that was destroyed during the September 11, 2001 attacks.

Established in 1962, the Arlington Historical Museum is operated by the Arlington Historical Society. It is housed in the former Hume School.

In 1985, through Warren G. Stambaugh, the Commonwealth of Virginia granted US$35,000 to improve the building.

The Society also operates the 18th-century Ball-Sellers House as a historic house museum and participates in many community events annually.
