= Fort Scott (Arlington, Virginia) =

Historical fort in Arlington, Virginia, United States

- Part of the Civil War defenses of Washington, D.C.
- Arlington, Virginia, USA
- Fort Scott Historical Sign

Site information
- Type: Earthwork fort
- Controlled by: Union Army
- Open to the public: yes
- Condition: Dismantled

Location
- Coordinates: 38°50′50.5″N 77°03′35″W

Site history
- Built: 1861
- Built by: U.S. Army Corps of Engineers
- In use: 1861–1865
- Materials: Earth, timber
- Demolished: 1865
- Battles/wars: American Civil War

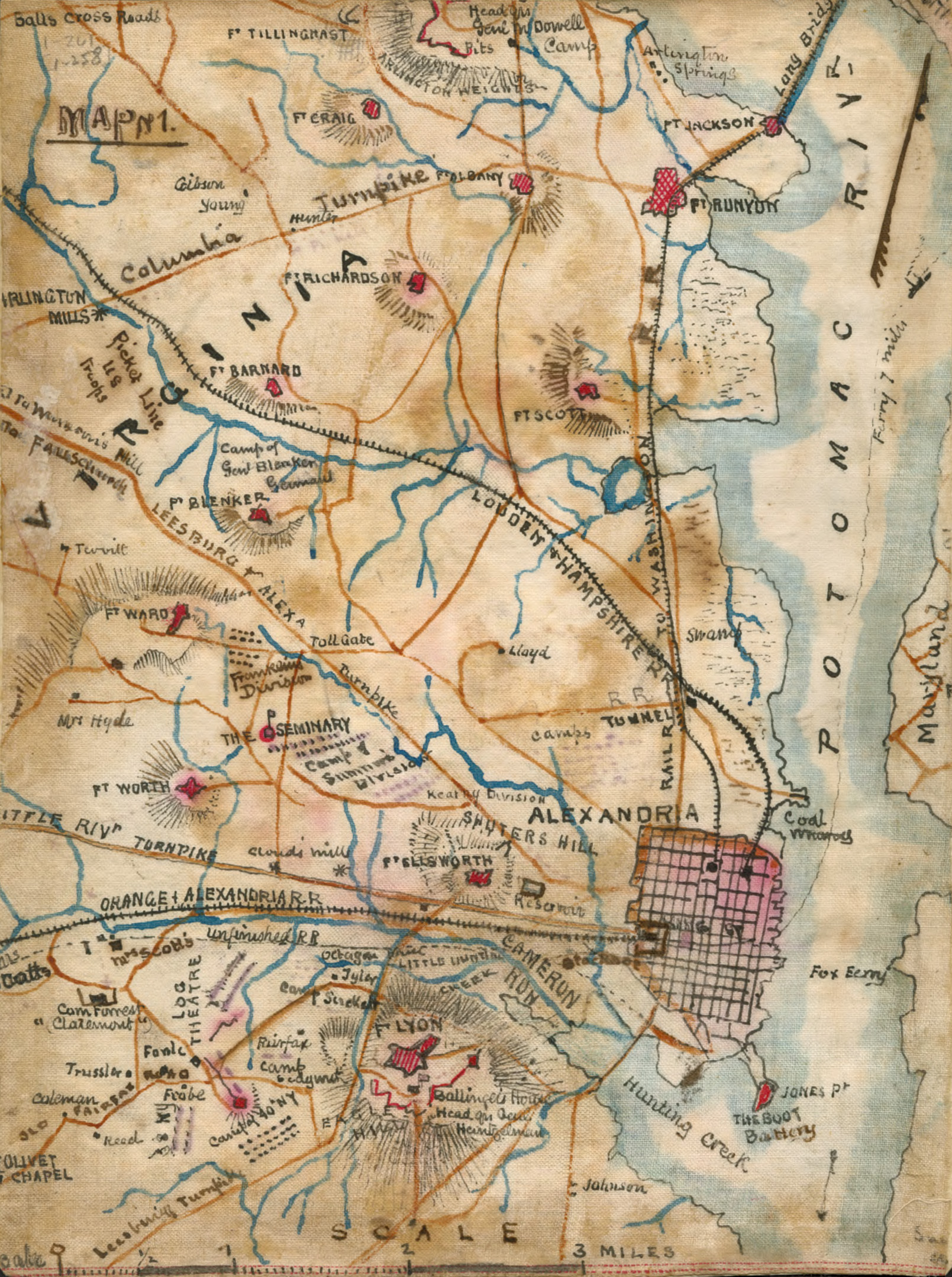
Map of Civil War forts near Alexandria, showing Fort Scott (ca. September 1861)

Fort Scott was a detached lunette constructed in May 1861 to guard the south flank of the defenses of Washington during the American Civil War. It was named for General Winfield Scott, who was then General-in-Chief of the Union Army. An historic marker and a small remnant of the fort are the only evidence of the site of the fort on the grounds of what is now Fort Scott Park in Arlington County, Virginia.

The fort was one of the ring of Union Army fortifications that the Union Army constructed as part of the Civil War defenses of Washington (see Washington, D.C., in the American Civil War). It was one of 33 forts on the Virginia side of the Potomac River that made up a defense line (the Arlington Line) for the national capital city.

The fort was built with a perimeter of 313 yards enclosing emplacements for eight guns, two magazines, a guard house and bombproof. Armament at one time included five 24-pounders, one 8" howitzer, one 30-pounder Parrott rifle, one 6-pounder and two 10" mortars.

A May 17, 1864, report from the Union Army's Inspector of Artillery noted the following:

Fort Scott, Major Trumbull commanding.–Garrison, one company First Connecticut Heavy Artillery–4 commissioned officers, 1 ordnance-sergeant, 137 men. Armament, two 12-pounder mountain howitzers, two 6- pounder James (rifled). Magazines, two; dry and in good condition. Ammunition, full supply and serviceable. Implements, complete. Drill in artillery, fair. Drill in infantry, fair. Discipline, fair. Garrison sufficient for the work."

Construction of the defense of Alexandria to the west subsequently reduced the importance of the fort. The fort was abandoned in 1865 at the end of the war.

The fort is located in the Arlington Ridge community.
