= Warren G. Stambaugh =

American attorney and politician

Member of Virginia House of Delegates
- In office 1974 – November 14, 1990

Personal details
- Born: Warren Glenn Stambaugh; August 7, 1944 Maysville, Kentucky
- Died: November 14, 1990 (aged 46) Georgetown University Hospital, Washington, D.C., US
- Party: Democratic
- Children: 2
- Education: Walsh School of Foreign Service; Columbus School of Law
- Occupation: Attorney, politician

Warren Glenn Stambaugh (August 7, 1944 — November 14, 1990) was an American attorney and politician who served as a Democrat for 16 years inside the Virginia House of Delegates.

== Life and education ==
Stambaugh was born on August 7, 1944, in Maysville, Kentucky, but later moved to Arlington County, Virginia. He graduated from the Walsh School of Foreign Service, and later the Columbus School of Law. He was married to two women, Dorothy Hoff, whom he later divorced, and Rosemary. He had 2 children: Peter and Elisabeth (Lisa), and 2 stepchildren: Patrick and Amy Storey. He was Catholic.

== Political career ==
Stambaugh began his political career in the Virginia House of Delegates in 1974, getting 16,218 votes in his election. He was an outspoken advocate for disabled rights, and while serving, helped pass the Virginians with Disabilities Act in 1985, which later became the Americans with Disabilities Act of 1990. In 1985, he secured a US$35,000 grant to improve the Arlington Historical Museum. He continued to serve as a delegate until his death in office on November 14, 1990, of a heart attack in the Georgetown University Hospital in Washington, D.C., at the age of 46. His funeral was held on March 21.
