= Gertrude Crocker =

American suffragist

Gertrude Lynde Crocker
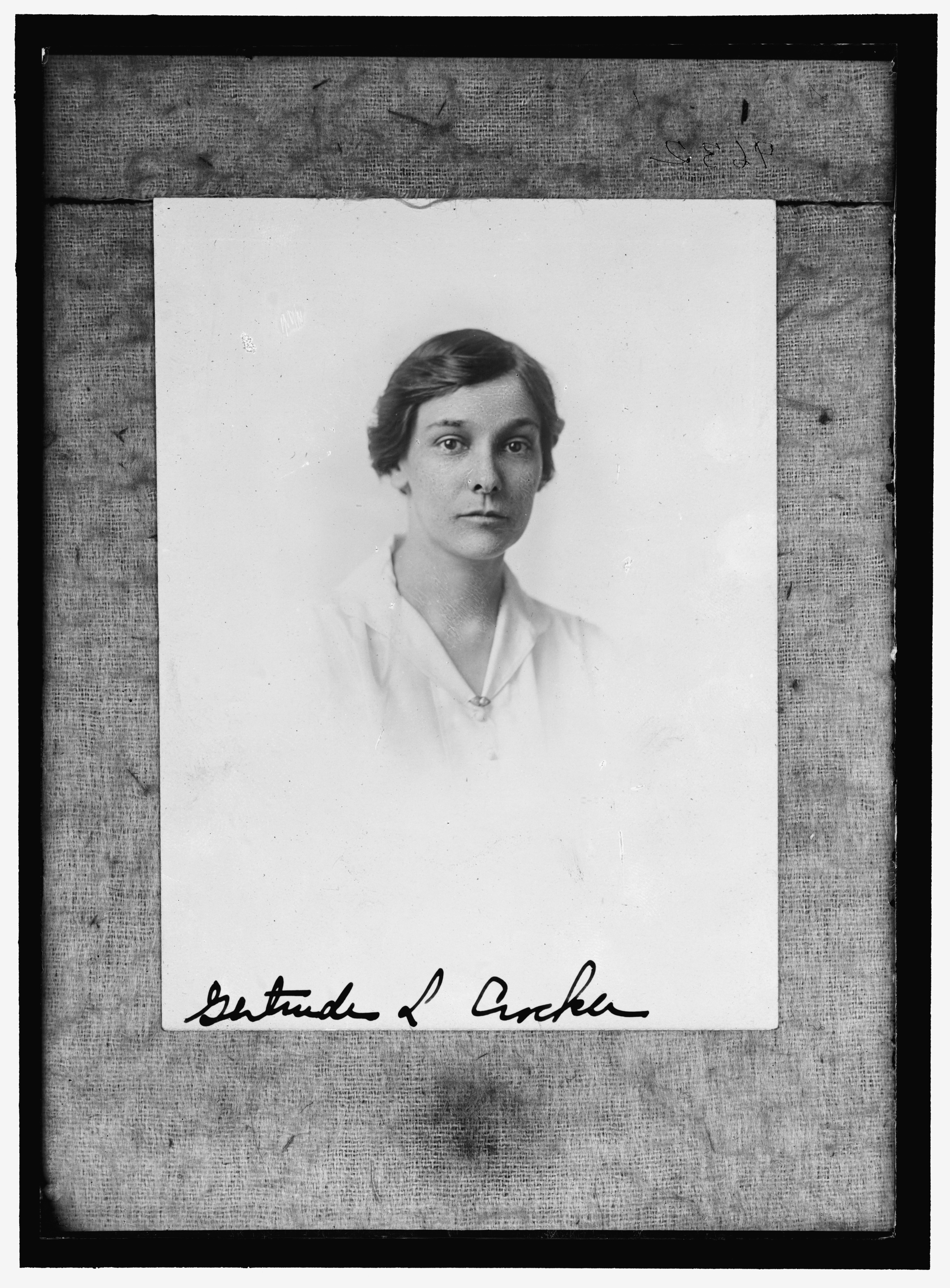
- Crocker in 1917
- Born: January 7, 1884; Milwaukee, Wisconsin
- Died: 1969 (aged 84–85); Fairfax, Virginia
- Education: Vassar College; University of Chicago (BS)
- Occupations: Business owner, suffragist

Gertrude Crocker (January 7, 1884 – 1969) was an American suffragist. A member of the Silent Sentinels, she picketed Woodrow Wilson's White House in support of women's suffrage in the United States and suffered through assault by prison guards during the 1917 Night of Terror.

== Early life and education ==
Crocker was born on January 7, 1884 in Milwaukee, Wisconsin. She grew up in Hinsdale, Illinois, where her father worked for the Chicago, Milwaukee, and St. Paul Railroad. Crocker attended her mother's alma mater, Vassar College, and graduated in 1907. She later earned a Bachelor of Science degree in mathematics from the University of Chicago in 1911.

== Career ==
Crocker joined the Congressional Union for Woman Suffrage in 1914. She was elected treasurer of the organization in 1916. She lobbied hard for passage of the Nineteenth Amendment to the United States Constitution, which was to guarantee women the right to vote. Crocker helped the effort to get early votes for the amendment as well as recruiting other women to the cause and organizing multiple mass mailings. Crocker visited North Carolina in 1915 in response to the Democratic party's resistance to passing the Nineteenth Amendment, criticizing representative Edward W. Pou for voting against it despite being a self-proclaimed suffragist himself. Her efforts led her to be described as one of the "most zealous leaders in the campaign".

On January 10, 1917, Crocker joined the group of 12 women known as the Silent Sentinels who protested outside the White House, standing silently in support of a woman's right to vote. Crocker and the other Sentinels continued the protest for over two years, in which she was arrested multiple times. On October 22, Crocker was arrested and found guilty of "obstructing a sidewalk" and forced to spend 30 days in Occoquan Workhouse. On the night of November 14, 1917, known as the "Night of Terror", the prison guards assaulted multiple women including Crocker. She was released six weeks later, emaciated and requiring assistance in walking to the car.

With the passage of the Nineteenth Amendment in 1920, Crocker returned to private life. The same year, she opened the Little Tea House restaurant on Arlington Ridge Road in Arlington, Virginia. Crocker decided to open a restaurant in order to be independent and her "own boss". It was one of the first restaurants in Arlington to serve racially mixed groups of people.

Crocker was president of the Soroptimist International of Arlington from 1946-1947.

== Later years ==
Crocker stayed involved with social issues and continued to advocate for women's right until her death. Her named is inscribed on the Turning Point Suffragist Memorial.

Crocker died in 1969 in Fairfax, Virginia following an extended illness.
