= Hume School =

Historic building in Virginia, US

- U.S. National Register of Historic Places
- Virginia Landmarks Register
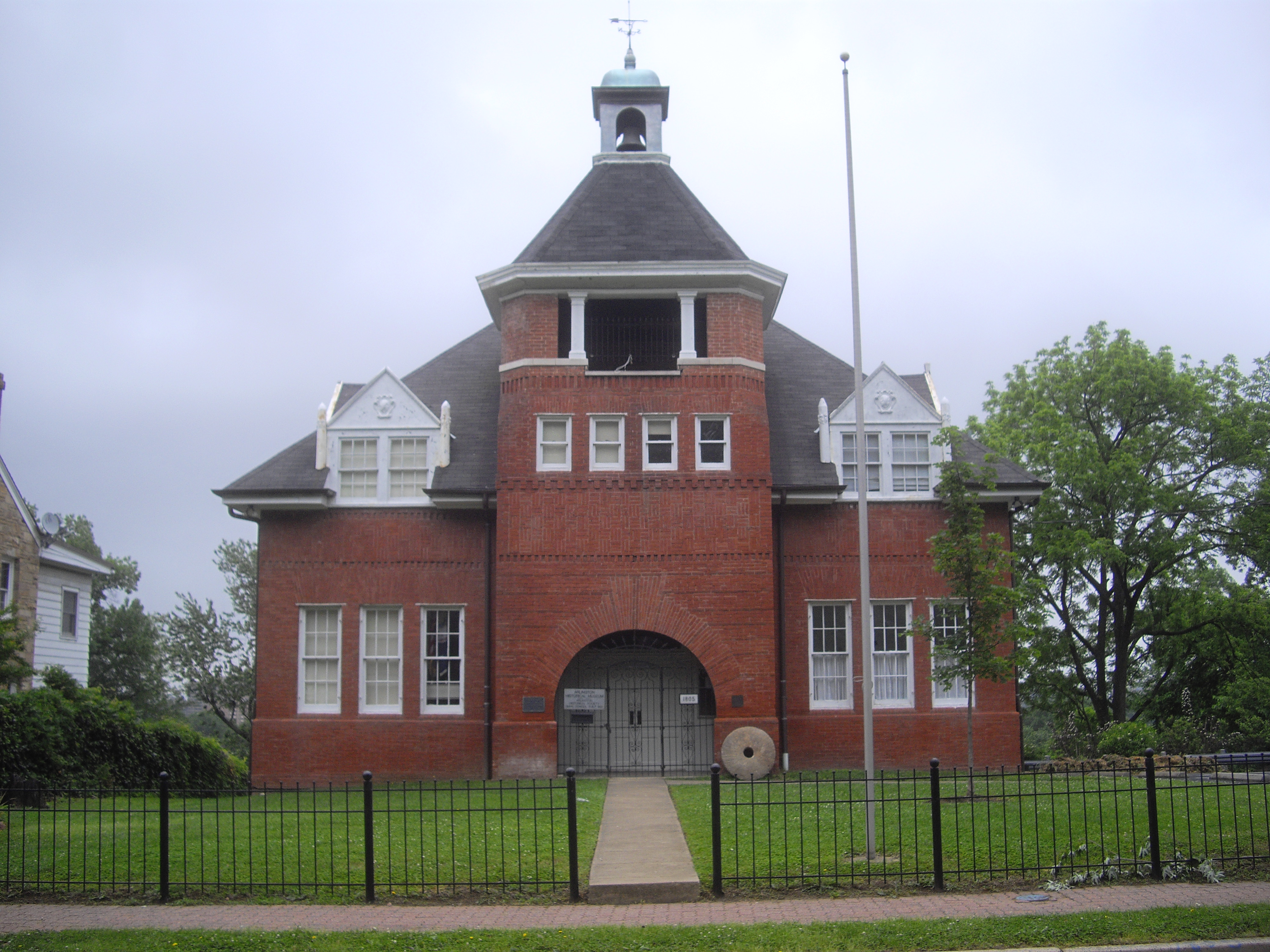
- Hume School in 2009

- Location within District of Columbia Location within Virginia Location within the United States
- Location: 1805 S. Arlington Ridge Rd., Arlington, Virginia
- Coordinates: 38°51′31″N 77°04′03″W
- Built: 1891
- Architect: B. Stanley Simmons
- Architectural style: Queen Anne
- NRHP reference No.: 79003027
- VLR No.: 000-0011

Significant dates
- Added to NRHP: June 18, 1979
- Designated VLR: September 26, 1979

The Hume School is an 1891 former school building in the Arlington Ridge neighborhood in Arlington County, Virginia. It is the oldest school building in Arlington County. It has been the home of the Arlington Historical Society since 1960.

== The building ==
The Queen Anne-style building was designed by B. Stanley Simmons, a Washington, D.C. architect. Its design reflects the changing thoughts around the importance of education and larger schools. Frank Hume, a Confederate veteran of the Civil War and local civic leader, sold his property to the county for $250 and donated some additional land for the playground. It was an active public school from 1891 until it closed in 1958. A community campaign ended with the building being deeded to the Arlington Historical Society in 1960. They later purchased additional property behind the building to ensure views toward Washington and prevent development.

The National Park Service listed the building on the National Register of Historic Places on June 18, 1979. The Arlington County Board designated the building to be a local historic district on October 3, 1978.

The Hume School is currently operated as the Arlington Historical Museum by the Arlington Historical Society. It has over 4000 artifacts representing all of the history of Arlington County. The museum is open on Saturdays and Sundays from 1:00 p.m. to 4:00 p.m.

== Arlington Historical Society ==
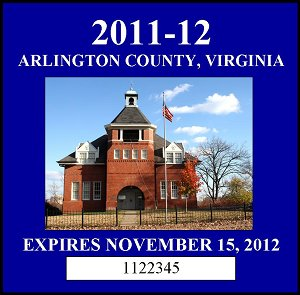
Arlington County 2011-2012 Vehicle Decal

The Arlington Historical Society was founded in September 1956. It moved into the Hume school in 1960 and began an extensive restoration before opening the building as a museum in the early 1960s. The AHS continues as a non-profit organization supporting research, preservation, and education efforts related to the local history of Arlington County, Virginia. The Ball-Sellers House was donated to the Arlington Historical Society in 1975 for preservation and interpretation.

On Feb 15th, 2011, Arlington County announced that the 2011-2012 vehicle decal sticker would feature a photo of the Hume School taken by Wakefield High School junior Maya Giacobbe as part of a contest.

== See also ==
- List of Arlington County Historic Districts
