= Glencarlyn, Virginia =

Neighborhood in Virginia, US

Coordinates: 38°51′48″N 77°7′32″W

Glencarlyn is a residential neighborhood in Arlington County, Virginia.

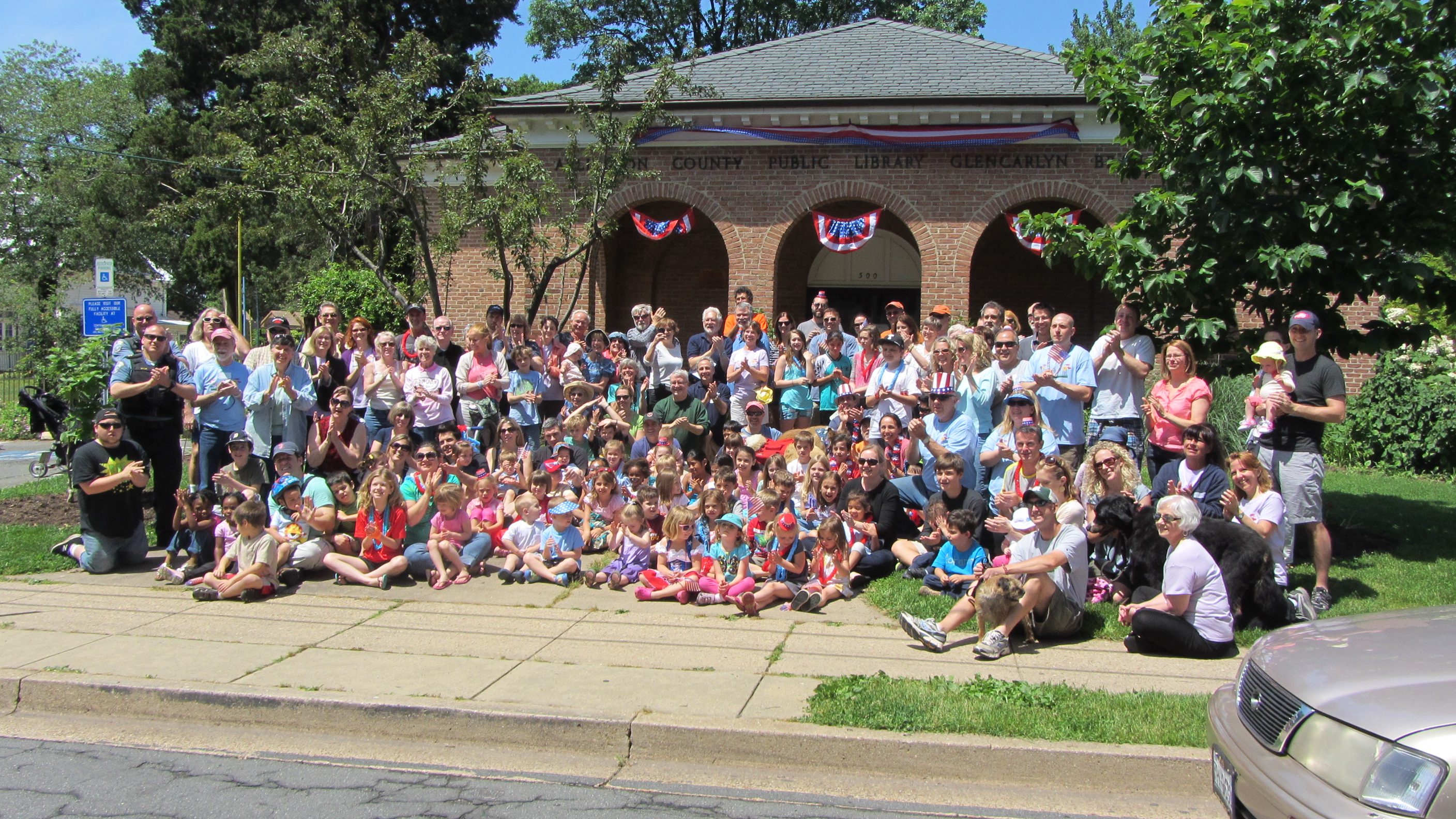
Glencarlyn Day, 125th anniversary, June 2, 2012

Originally created as a summer community for Washingtonians who wished to escape the heat of the city, Glencarlyn was founded by partners Samuel S. Burdett, a former Missouri congressman, and his partner George W. Curtis in 1888.

== Boundaries ==
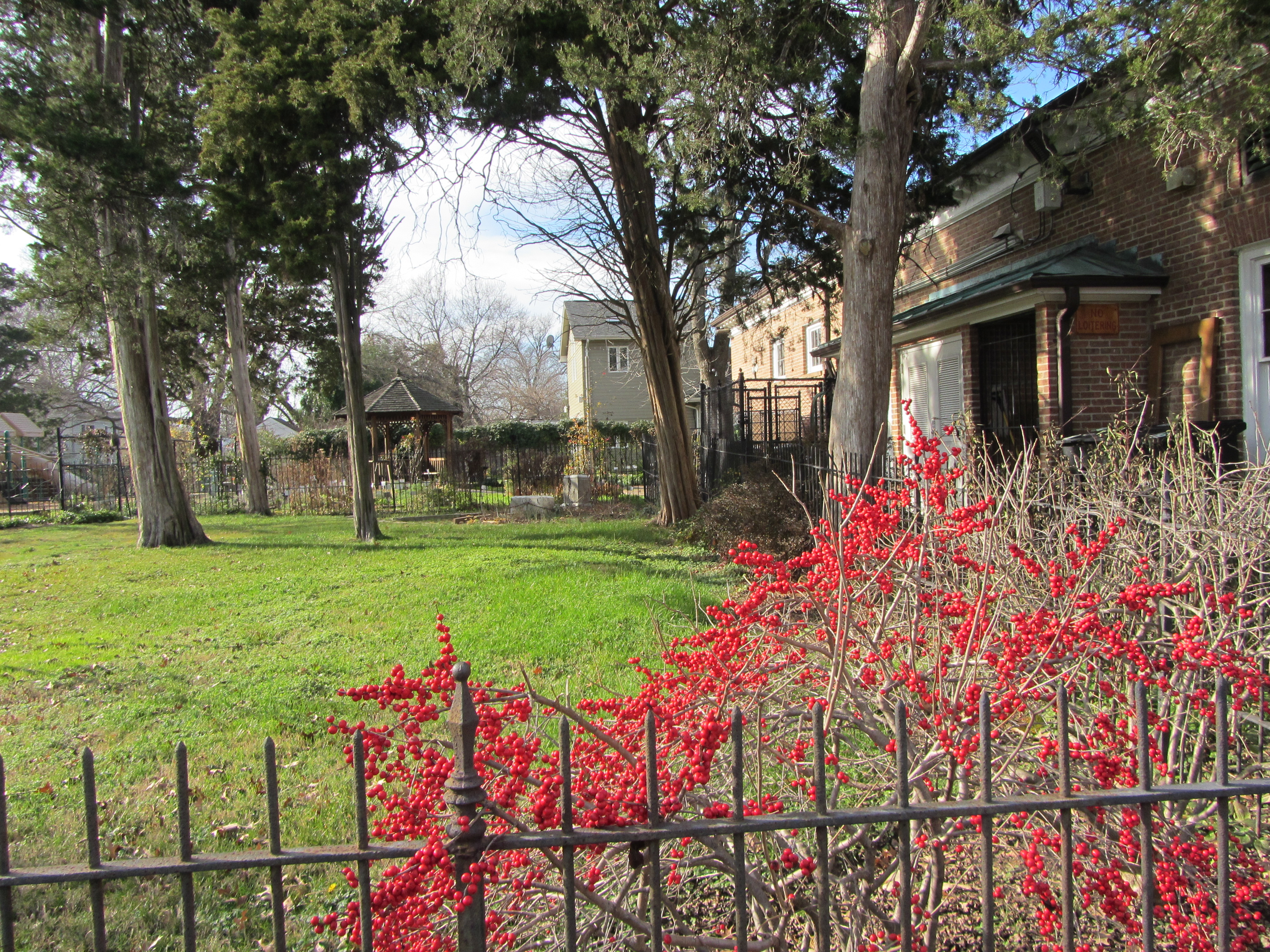
Carlin Family Cemetery

Glencarlyn is approximately bounded by Arlington Boulevard (US-50) to the North, South Manchester Street to the West, 5th Road South to the South, and Glencarlyn Park to the East. The neighborhood also includes properties to the North of Arlington Boulevard, just off of North Carlin Springs Road, as well as properties just South of 5th Road South.

== Glencarlyn landmarks ==
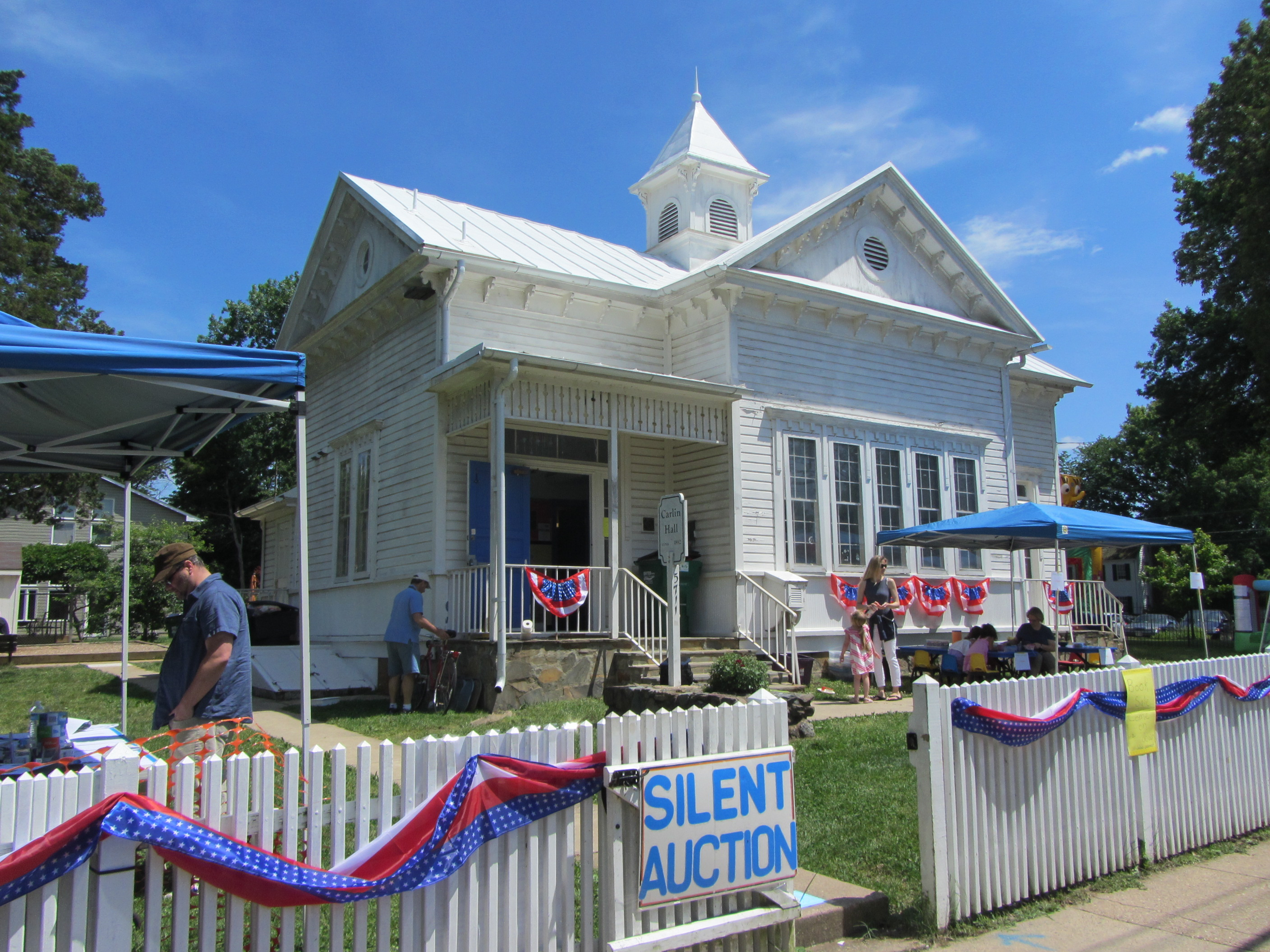
Carlin Hall on Glencarlyn Day, 125th anniversary, June 2, 2012

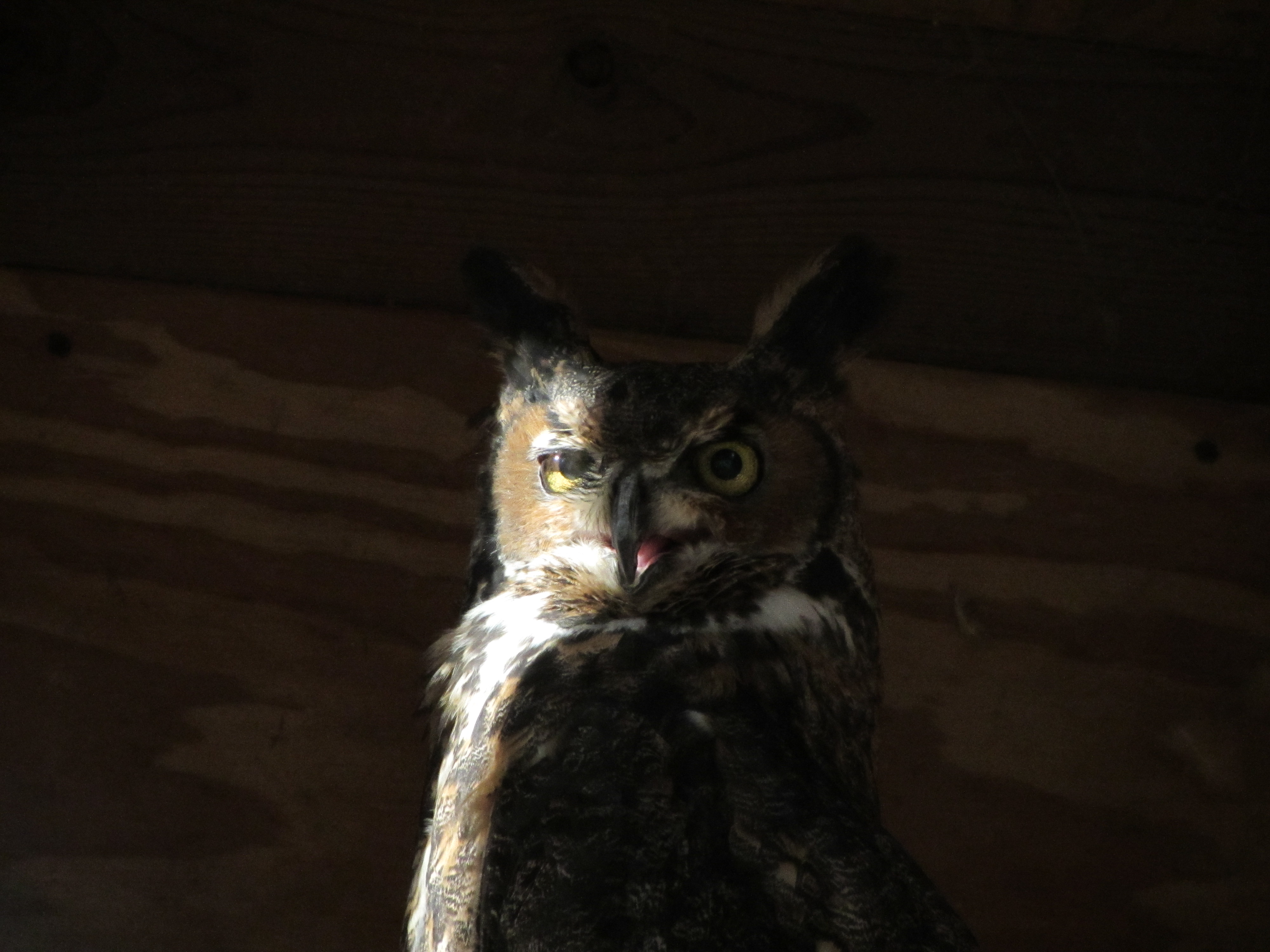
Great horned owl, Long Branch Nature Center

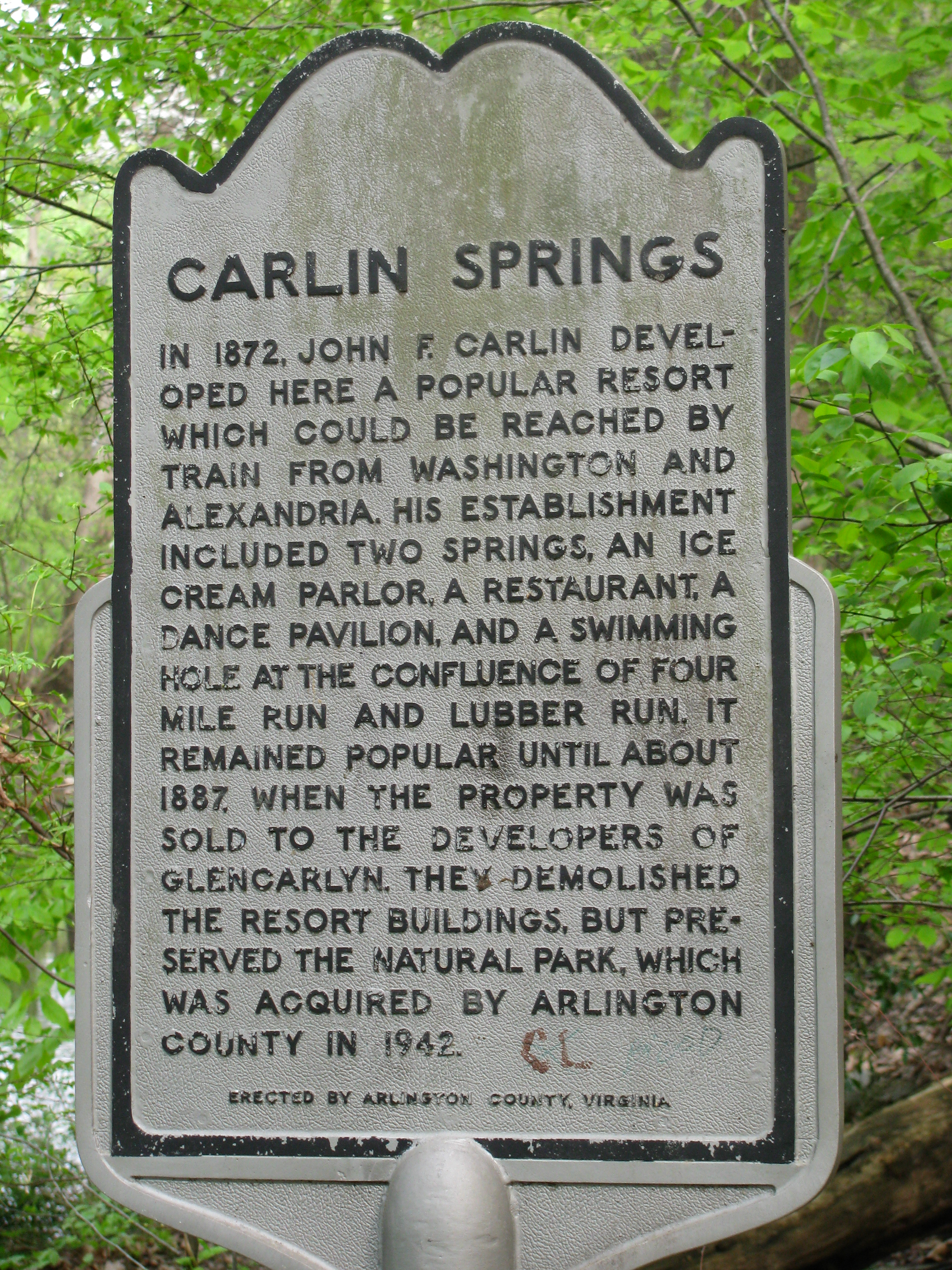
Carlin Springs Marker

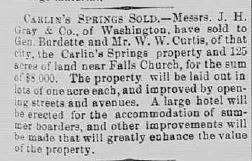
Carlin Springs Sold, article from Alexandria Gazette, April 21, 1887

- Glencarlyn Historic District, listed on the National Register of Historic Places in 2008.
- The Ball-Sellers House, 5620 Third Street South
- Carlin Family Cemetery, 300 South Kensington Street
- Carlin Hall, a school and community center built in 1892, 5711 Fourth Street South
- Glencarlyn Library, 300 South Kensington Street
- St. John's Episcopal Church, 415 South Lexington Street
- The General Samuel S. Burdett House, 5627 Third Street South
- Long Branch Nature Center, 625 S. Carlin Springs Road
- Reynolds Cemetery, South Lancaster St
- Kenmore Middle School
- Carlin Springs Elementary School

== Historic events in Glencarlyn ==
- On November 22, 1922, the Audubon Society of Glencarlyn met at Curtis Hall (now known as the Glencarlyn Community Center). The society chapter met to advocate for legislation to protect birds in Virginia.

== Notable Glencarlynites ==
- Marion T. Anderson
- Samuel S. Burdett
