= Ball–Sellers House =

Historic house in Virginia, United States

- U.S. National Register of Historic Places
- Virginia Landmarks Register
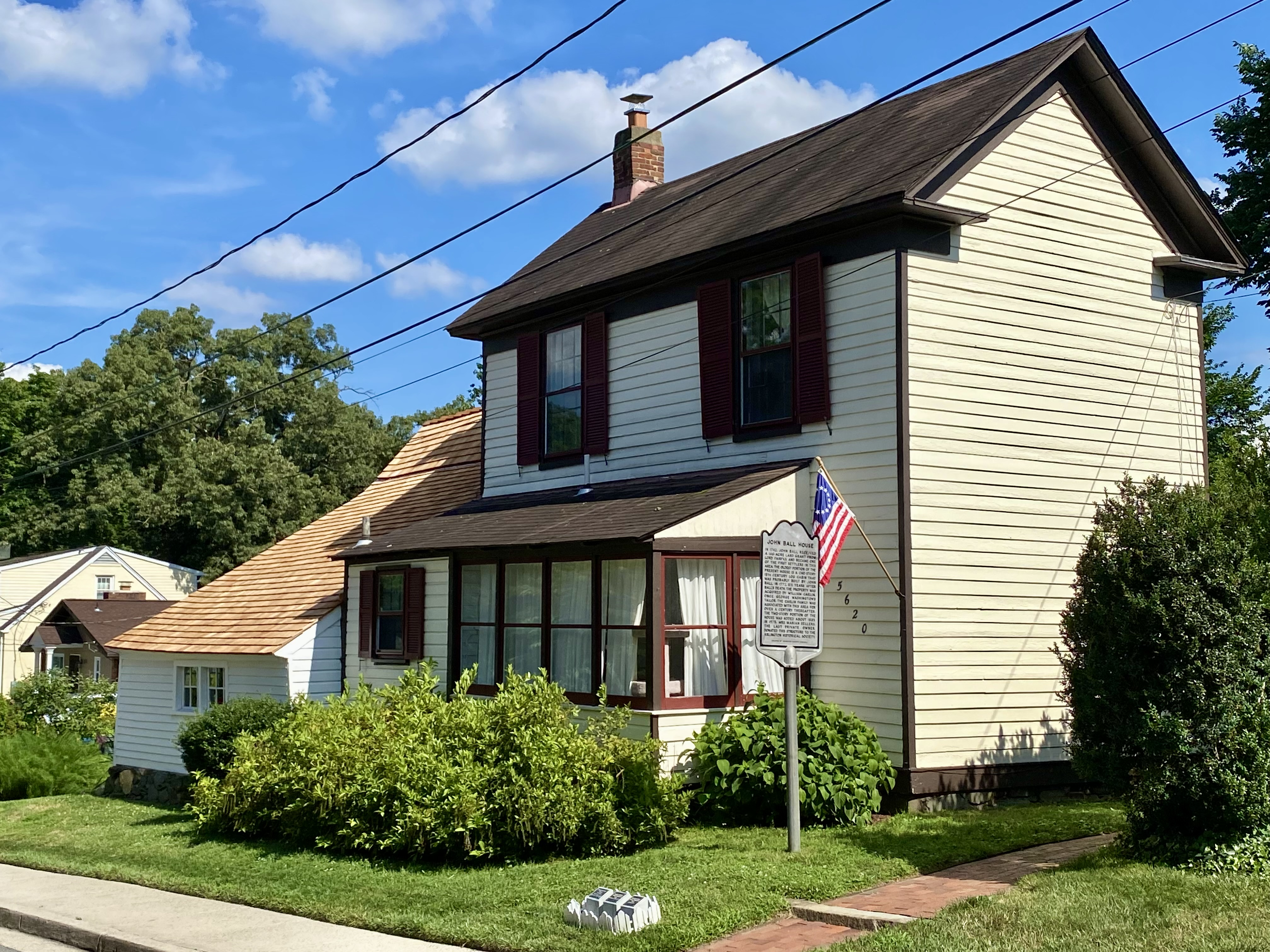
- Ball–Sellers House

- Location within District of Columbia Location within Virginia Location within the United States
- Location: 5620 3rd St. S., Arlington, Virginia
- Coordinates: 38°51′49″N 77°7′31″W
- Area: less than one acre
- Built: c. 1750, 1885
- NRHP reference No.: 75002014
- VLR No.: 000-0009

Significant dates
- Added to NRHP: July 17, 1975
- Designated VLR: June 17, 1975

The Ball–Sellers House, also named the John Ball House, is the oldest building in Arlington County, Virginia. It is an historic home located at 5620 Third Street, South, in the county's Glencarlyn neighborhood. The Arlington Historical Society, which owns the building, estimates that the one room log cabin was built in the 1740s.

In the mid-18th century, yeoman farmer John Ball built a one-room log cabin with a loft in what is now Arlington, Virginia. Later he added a lean-to and covered the structure with clapboard. The cabin is presently the oldest building known to exist in Arlington County. It is a rare example of the dwelling of the ordinary person during the 1700s.

John Ball obtained a 166-acre land grant along Four Mile Run from Lord Fairfax in 1742. To construct his cabin, he felled trees and hewed logs. He notched the logs and chinked the cracks with mud daubing. Visitors today can see the original logs with the daubing, as well as the wide plank floors. The rare oak clapboard roof is among only a few board roofs preserved in the nation.

John, his wife Elizabeth, and their five daughters lived in this little house. An inventory of Ball's estate indicates they lived a simple life in the sparsely furnished dwelling. They farmed, raising wheat and corn, and kept sheep, cows, pigs, and bees. Ball also had a mill on Four Mile Run, and part of his mill stones are on display.

Following John Ball's death in 1766, William Carlin, an Alexandria tailor who included George Washington and George Mason among his clients, purchased the house. Three generations of the Carlin family owned the property for more than 100 years. The third generation, brother and sister Andrew and Anne, ran a dairy farm and built the 1885 addition that adjoins the original Ball cabin. They also owned and operated Carlin Springs, a pavilion featuring a restaurant, health springs, and picnic grounds. When the Carlins sold the property in 1887, the land was subdivided into a community known today as Glencarlyn, the oldest subdivision in Arlington. The house survived and was used as a school, a summer cottage, and a home. The last owner, Marian Rhinehart Sellers, gave the house to the Arlington Historical Society in 1975 so that it would be preserved and open to the public. It is open for tours on Saturdays from 1:00-4:00 from April through October.

The National Park Service listed the house on the National Register of Historic Places on July 17, 1975. The Arlington County Board designated the building to be a local historic district on October 3, 1978. The county's website states that the building was constructed around 1760. A historical marker near the house, which identifies the structure as the "John Ball House", summarizes the building's history.
