= Carlin Hall =

- U.S. National Register of Historic Places
- Virginia Landmarks Register
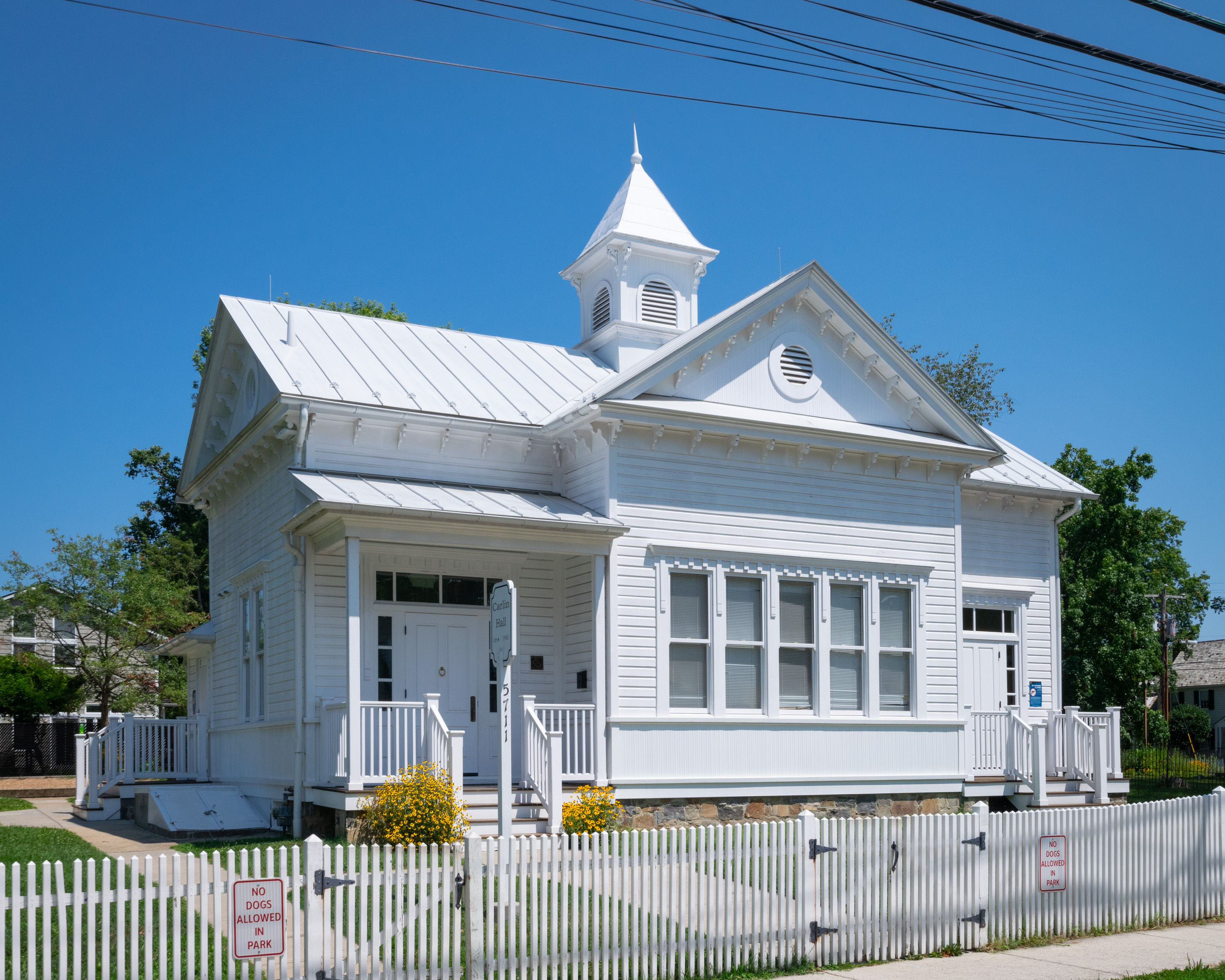
- Carlin Hall

- Location within District of Columbia Location within Virginia Location within the United States
- Location: 5711 4th St., S., Arlington, Virginia
- Coordinates: 38°51′47″N 77°7′35″W
- Area: less than one acre
- Built: 1892
- Built by: Bailey, Theodore
- Architectural style: Late Victorian
- NRHP reference No.: 93000833
- VLR No.: 000-0039

Significant dates
- Added to NRHP: August 12, 1993
- Designated VLR: June 16, 1993

Carlin Hall, also known as Curtis Hall, Carlin Community Hall, Glencarlyn School, Glencarlyn Recreation Center, is a historic community center located in the Glencarlyn section of Arlington, Virginia, US. It was built in 1892, and is a tall one-story, frame, Late Victorian cross-plan community hall. It measures approximately 45 feet wide and 30 feet deep. The standing seam metal gable roof is topped by a four-sided wood cupola. It originally served as a meeting place for the newly formed Glencarlyn civic association and the Episcopal church congregation, provided a place for a variety of community social events. The building housed an elementary school from the 1920s to 1950. In 1953, it was returned by Arlington County as a community center.

It was listed on the National Register of Historic Places in 1993.
