= National Register of Historic Places listings in Arlington County, Virginia =

Location of Arlington County in Virginia

This is a list of the National Register of Historic Places listings in Arlington County, Virginia.

This is intended to be a complete list of the properties and districts on the National Register of Historic Places in Arlington County, Virginia, United States. The locations of National Register properties and districts for which the latitude and longitude coordinates are included below, may be seen in an online map.

There are 71 properties and districts listed on the National Register in the county, including 5 National Historic Landmarks.

This National Park Service list is complete through NPS recent listings posted September 25, 2026.

== Current listings ==
	Name on the Register	Image	Date listed	Location	City or town	Description
1	Al's Motors	Al's Motors	July 5, 2003 (#03000628)	3910 Wilson Boulevard; 38°52′47″N 77°06′24″W	Ballston	Currently a Gold's Gym
2	Arlington Forest Historic District	Arlington Forest Historic District	December 2, 2005 (#05001344)	Bounded by Carlin Springs Rd., George Mason Dr., Henderson Rd., Aberdeen St., Columbus St., Granada, Galveston, and 2nd 38°52′14″N 77°07′08″W	Arlington	
3	Arlington Heights Historic District	Arlington Heights Historic District	February 21, 2008 (#08000063)	Bounded by Arlington Boulevard, S. Fillmore St., S. Walter Reed Dr., Columbia Pk., and S. Glebe Rd. 38°52′03″N 77°05′27″W	Arlington	
4	Arlington House, The Robert E. Lee Memorial	Arlington House, The Robert E. Lee Memorial	October 15, 1966 (#66000040)	Arlington National Cemetery; 38°52′52″N 77°04′21″W	Arlington	Boundary increase on 2014-03-17, listed as the Arlington House Historic District
5	Arlington Memorial Bridge	Arlington Memorial Bridge	April 4, 1980 (#80000346)	Spans the Potomac River; 38°53′06″N 77°03′44″W	Arlington	Extends into central Washington, D.C.
6	Arlington National Cemetery Historic District	Arlington National Cemetery Historic District	April 11, 2014 (#14000146)	1 Memorial Drive; 38°52′48″N 77°04′12″W	Arlington	Includes the cemetery, Arlington House, Memorial Drive, and the Hemicycle
7	Arlington Ridge Park	Arlington Ridge Park	September 4, 2009 (#09000688)	Northwestern corner of N. Meade St. and Marshall Dr. 38°53′26″N 77°04′11″W	Arlington	
8	Arlington Village Historic District	Arlington Village Historic District	April 11, 2003 (#03000215)	S. 13th St., S. 13 Rd., S. 16th St., S. Barton S., S. Cleveland St., and Edgewood St. 38°51′33″N 77°05′02″W	Arlington	
9	Ashton Heights Historic District	Ashton Heights Historic District	June 23, 2003 (#03000561)	Roughly bounded by Wilson Boulevard, N. Irving St., Arlington Boulevard, N. Oxford St., N. Piedmont St., and N. Oakland St. 38°51′08″N 77°03′28″W	Arlington	
10	Aurora Highlands Historic District	Aurora Highlands Historic District	October 22, 2008 (#08001018)	Bounded by 16th St., S., S. Eads St., 26th St., S., and S. Joyce St. 38°51′16″N 77°03′28″W	Arlington	Historic early and mid-20th century suburban development later at the center of a U.S. Supreme Court case that held residential zoned parking constitutional
11	Ball-Sellers House	Ball-Sellers House	July 17, 1975 (#75002014)	5620 S. 3rd St. 38°51′50″N 77°07′30″W	Glencarlyn	
12	Barcroft Apartments		July 15, 2026 (#100013201)	Columbia Pike, South Four Mile Run Drive, South George Mason Drive, South Taylor Street, South Thomas Street, South Wakefield Street; 38°51′00″N 77°05′52″W	Arlington	
13	Barcroft Community House	Barcroft Community House	July 28, 1995 (#95000928)	800 S. Buchanan St. 38°51′35″N 77°06′37″W	Arlington	
14	Benjamin Banneker: SW-9 Intermediate Boundary Stone	Benjamin Banneker: SW-9 Intermediate Boundary Stone	May 11, 1976 (#76002094)	18th and Van Buren Sts. 38°52′59″N 77°09′33″W	Arlington	
15	Buckingham Historic District	Buckingham Historic District	January 21, 1999 (#98001649)	Roughly bounded by N. 5th, N. Oxford, and N. 2nd Sts., and N. Glebe Rd.; also bounded by N. Oxford St., 5th St., N., N. Henderson Rd., 1st St., N., N. Pershing, N. Thomas St., and 2nd St., N.; also bounded by and including N. Thomas St., 4th St., N., N. Pershing Dr., and N. George Mason Dr. 38°52′30″N 77°06′20″W	Arlington	Second and third sets of boundaries represent boundary increases of February 11, 2004 and March 23, 2010
16	Calvert Manor	Calvert Manor	December 15, 1997 (#97001506)	1925-1927 N. Calvert St. 38°53′44″N 77°05′31″W	Arlington	
17	Carlin Hall	Carlin Hall	August 12, 1993 (#93000833)	5711 4th St., S. 38°51′47″N 77°07′34″W	Glencarlyn	
18	Cherrydale Historic District	Cherrydale Historic District	May 22, 2003 (#03000461)	Roughly bounded by Lorcom Ln., N. Utah and N. Taylor Sts., and Interstate 66; 38°53′41″N 77°06′12″W	Cherrydale	
19	Cherrydale Volunteer Fire House	Cherrydale Volunteer Fire House	July 28, 1995 (#95000927)	3900 N. U.S. Route 29; 38°53′47″N 77°06′26″W	Cherrydale	
20	Claremont Historic District	Claremont Historic District	August 31, 2006 (#06000751)	Bounded by S. Dinwiddie St., S. Chesterfield Rd., S. Buchanan St., 25th St., S., 24th St., S., 23rd St., S., and 22nd St., S. 38°50′47″N 77°06′20″W	Arlington	
21	Clarendon School	Clarendon School	December 9, 1999 (#99001502)	3550 Wilson Boulevard; 38°52′54″N 77°06′07″W	Clarendon	Currently the Arlington Arts Center
22	Colonial Village	Colonial Village	December 9, 1980 (#80004170)	Roughly bounded by Wilson Boulevard, U.S. Route 29, N. Veitch St., and Queens Lane; 38°53′40″N 77°05′00″W	Arlington	
23	Columbia Forest Historic District	Columbia Forest Historic District	February 11, 2004 (#04000047)	Bounded by 11th, S. Edison, S. Dinwiddie, S. Columbus, S. George Mason, and S. Frederick St. 38°51′09″N 77°06′41″W	Arlington	
24	George Crossman House	George Crossman House	May 22, 2003 (#03000455)	2501 N. Underwood St. 38°53′32″N 77°09′39″W	Arlington	
25	Dominion Hills Historic District	Dominion Hills Historic District	April 24, 2012 (#12000239)	Roughly bounded by N. Four Mile Run Dr., N. McKinley Rd., N. Larrimore, N. Madison, and N. Montana Sts., and 9th St., N. 38°52′33″N 77°08′29″W	Arlington	
26	Charles Richard Drew House	Charles Richard Drew House	May 11, 1976 (#76002095)	2505 1st St., S. 38°52′22″N 77°05′12″W	Arlington	
27	Fairlington Historic District	Fairlington Historic District	March 29, 1999 (#99000368)	Roughly bounded by Quaker Lane, King St., Interstate 395, S. Walter Reed Dr., and S. Abingdon St. 38°50′17″N 77°05′57″W	Fairlington	
28	Fort C. F. Smith Historic District	Fort C. F. Smith Historic District	February 1, 2000 (#99001719)	2411 24th St. 38°54′06″N 77°05′25″W	Arlington	
29	Fort Ethan Allen	Fort Ethan Allen	February 11, 2004 (#04000052)	Junction of Glebe and Ridgeview Rds. 38°55′27″N 77°07′26″W	Arlington	
30	Fort Myer Historic District	Fort Myer Historic District	November 28, 1972 (#72001380)	U.S. Route 50; 38°52′58″N 77°04′58″W	Arlington	
31	George Washington Memorial Parkway	George Washington Memorial Parkway	June 2, 1995 (#95000605)	Roughly the southern side of the Potomac River from the American Legion Bridge to Memorial Bridge, and the northern side from Brickyard Rd. to the Chain Bridge; 38°55′15″N 77°06′33″W	Arlington	
32	Georgetown Pike	Georgetown Pike	August 22, 2012 (#12000537)	From the District of Columbia boundary at Chain Bridge to the junction with Leesburg Pike at Seneca Rd. 38°55′52″N 77°07′09″W	Arlington	Extends into Fairfax County
33	Glebe Apartments	Glebe Apartments	November 25, 2020 (#100005835)	210-212 North Glebe Rd. 38°52′23″N 77°06′14″W	Arlington	
34	Glebe Center	Glebe Center	February 11, 2004 (#04000055)	71-89 N. Glebe Rd. 38°52′20″N 77°06′34″W	Ballston	
35	The Glebe	The Glebe	February 23, 1972 (#72001381)	4527 17th St., N. 38°53′31″N 77°07′04″W	Arlington	Has octagon wing
36	Glebewood Village Historic District	Glebewood Village Historic District	February 11, 2004 (#04000049)	N. Brandywine St. between Lee Highway and 10th Place N., and 21st Rd. between N. Brandywine St. and N. Glebe Rd. 38°53′44″N 77°07′26″W	Arlington	
37	Glencarlyn Historic District	Glencarlyn Historic District	September 18, 2008 (#08000910)	Bounded by S. Carlin Springs Rd., Arlington Boulevard, 5th Rd. S., and Glencarlyn Park; 38°51′49″N 77°07′35″W	Glencarlyn	
38	Harry W. Gray House	Harry W. Gray House	February 11, 2004 (#64000051)	1005 S. Quinn St. 38°51′54″N 77°04′29″W	Arlington	
39	Highland Park-Overlee Knolls	Highland Park-Overlee Knolls	August 18, 2011 (#11000548)	Roughly bounded by 22nd St., N., N. Lexington St., 16th St., N., N. Longfellow St., McKinley Rd., Interstate 66, and N. Quantico St. 38°53′12″N 77°08′49″W	Arlington	
40	Hume School	Hume School	June 18, 1979 (#79003027)	1805 S. Arlington Ridge Rd. 38°51′32″N 77°04′03″W	Arlington	
41	Francis Scott Key Bridge	Francis Scott Key Bridge	March 1, 1996 (#96000199)	U.S. Route 29 over the Potomac River; 38°54′05″N 77°04′13″W	Arlington	
42	Lee Gardens North Historic District	Lee Gardens North Historic District	February 26, 2004 (#04000109)	2300-2341 N. 11th St. 38°53′08″N 77°05′12″W	Arlington	
43	Lomax African Methodist Episcopal Zion Church	Lomax African Methodist Episcopal Zion Church	February 11, 2004 (#04000038)	2704 24th Rd., S. 38°50′52″N 77°04′56″W	Arlington	
44	Lyon Park Historic District	Lyon Park Historic District	November 12, 2003 (#03000437)	Roughly bounded by 10th St., N., Arlington Boulevard, and N. Irving St. 38°52′45″N 77°05′26″W	Arlington	
45	Lyon Village Historic District	Lyon Village Historic District	May 10, 2002 (#02000512)	Roughly bounded by U.S. Route 29, N. Veitch St., N. Franklin Rd., N. Highland St., N. Fillmore St., and N. Kirkwood Rd. 38°53′29″N 77°05′42″W	Arlington	
46	Maywood Historic District	Maywood Historic District	May 22, 2003 (#03000460)	Roughly bounded by Lorcom Ln., Spout Run Parkway, Interstate 66, U.S. Route 29, N. Oakland St., N. Nelson St., and N. Lincoln St. 38°53′53″N 77°06′05″W	Arlington	
47	Monroe Courts Historic District	Monroe Courts Historic District	February 21, 2008 (#08000064)	1041-1067 N. Nelson and 1036-1062 and 1033-1055 N. Monroe Sts. 38°53′08″N 77°06′16″W	Arlington	
48	Mount Vernon Memorial Highway	Mount Vernon Memorial Highway	May 18, 1981 (#81000079)	Washington St. and George Washington Memorial Parkway; 38°51′54″N 77°02′29″W	Arlington	
49	Northwest No. 1 Boundary Marker of the Original District of Columbia	Northwest No. 1 Boundary Marker of the Original District of Columbia	February 1, 1991 (#91000003)	3607 Powhatan St. 38°54′12″N 77°09′33″W	Arlington	
50	Northwest No. 2 Boundary Marker of the Original District of Columbia	Northwest No. 2 Boundary Marker of the Original District of Columbia	February 1, 1991 (#91000004)	5145 N. 38th St. 38°54′49″N 77°08′46″W	Arlington	
51	Northwest No. 3 Boundary Marker of the Original District of Columbia	Northwest No. 3 Boundary Marker of the Original District of Columbia	February 1, 1991 (#91000005)	4013 N. Tazewell St. 38°55′28″N 77°07′55″W	Arlington	
52	Penrose Historic District	Penrose Historic District	November 15, 2004 (#04000112)	Roughly bounded by Arlington Boulevard, S. Courthouse Rd., S. Fillmore St., S. Barton St., and Columbia Pike; 38°52′08″N 77°05′04″W	Arlington	
53	Pentagon Office Building Complex	Pentagon Office Building Complex	July 27, 1989 (#89000932)	State Route 110 at Interstate 395; 38°52′16″N 77°03′23″W	Pentagon City	Boundary increase approved September 11, 2023.
54	Quarters 1, Fort Myer	Quarters 1, Fort Myer	November 28, 1972 (#72001382)	Grant Ave. 38°52′58″N 77°04′53″W	Arlington	
55	Saegmuller House	Saegmuller House	May 22, 2003 (#03000453)	5101 Little Falls Rd. 38°54′22″N 77°08′24″W	Arlington	
56	Southwest No. 4 Boundary Marker of the Original District of Columbia	Southwest No. 4 Boundary Marker of the Original District of Columbia	February 1, 1991 (#91000009)	King St. north of the junction with Wakefield St. 38°49′54″N 77°05′36″W	Alexandria	
57	Southwest No. 5 Boundary Marker of the Original District of Columbia	Southwest No. 5 Boundary Marker of the Original District of Columbia	February 1, 1991 (#91000010)	Northeast of the junction of King St. and Walter Reed Dr. 38°50′31″N 77°06′24″W	Arlington	
58	Southwest No. 6 Boundary Marker of the Original District of Columbia	Southwest No. 6 Boundary Marker of the Original District of Columbia	February 1, 1991 (#91000011)	S. Jefferson St. south of the junction with Columbia Pike, in the median strip 38°51′07″N 77°07′09″W	Arlington	
59	Southwest No. 7 Boundary Marker of the Original District of Columbia	Southwest No. 7 Boundary Marker of the Original District of Columbia	February 1, 1991 (#91000012)	Behind 3101 S. Manchester St. 38°51′44″N 77°07′57″W	Arlington	
60	Southwest No. 8 Boundary Marker of the Original District of Columbia	Southwest No. 8 Boundary Marker of the Original District of Columbia	February 1, 1991 (#91000013)	Junction of Wilson Boulevard and John Marshall Dr., behind an apartment building 38°52′22″N 77°08′45″W	Arlington	Extends into Fairfax County
61	Stratford Junior High School	Stratford Junior High School	February 26, 2004 (#04000110)	4100 Vacation Ln. 38°54′00″N 77°06′44″W	Cherrydale	
62	Unitarian Universalist Church of Arlington	Unitarian Universalist Church of Arlington	November 19, 2014 (#14000943)	4444 Arlington Boulevard; 38°52′06″N 77°06′27″W	Arlington	
63	US Post Office-Arlington	US Post Office-Arlington	February 7, 1986 (#86000151)	3118 N. Washington Boulevard; 38°53′08″N 77°05′44″W	Clarendon	
64	Virginia Heights Historic District	Virginia Heights Historic District	February 21, 2008 (#08000065)	Bounded by 10th Pl., S., S. Frederick St., and S. George Mason Dr. 38°51′02″N 77°06′53″W	Arlington	
65	Walter Reed Gardens Historic District	Walter Reed Gardens Historic District	May 22, 2003 (#03000451)	2900-2906 13th St., S., 2900-2914 13th Rd., S., and 1301-1319 S. Walter Reed Dr. 38°51′33″N 77°05′13″W	Arlington	
66	Washington National Airport Terminal and South Hangar Line	Washington National Airport Terminal and South Hangar Line	September 12, 1997 (#97001111)	Thomas Ave. 38°50′56″N 77°02′30″W	Arlington	
67	Waverly Hills Historic District	Waverly Hills Historic District	February 26, 2004 (#04000111)	Roughly bounded by 20th Rd., N., N. Utah St, Interstate 66, N. Glebe Rd., and N. Vermont St. 38°53′31″N 77°07′02″W	Arlington	
68	West Cornerstone	West Cornerstone	February 1, 1991 (#91000014)	Western side of Meridian St., south of the junction with Williamsburg Boulevard; 38°53′36″N 77°10′20″W	Falls Church	
69	Westover Historic District	Westover Historic District	May 2, 2006 (#06000345)	Bounded by McKinley Rd., N. Washington Boulevard, N. 16th St., N. Jefferson St., N. 11th St., and N. Fairfax Dr. 38°52′58″N 77°08′11″W	Arlington	
70	Windsor Apartments	Windsor Apartments	May 13, 2021 (#100006520)	20-204 North Thomas St. 38°52′16″N 77°06′18″W	Arlington	
71	Earle Micajah Winslow House	Earle Micajah Winslow House	February 22, 2011 (#11000028)	2333 N. Vernon St. 38°54′06″N 77°07′09″W	Arlington	

== See also ==
- List of National Historic Landmarks in Virginia
- National Register of Historic Places listings in Virginia
- National Register of Historic Places listings in Falls Church, Virginia
- National Register of Historic Places listings in Alexandria, Virginia
