= Aurora Highlands =

Aurora Highlands may refer to:

== Places ==
- The Aurora Highlands, a master-planned community in Aurora, Colorado
- Aurora Highlands Historic District in Arlington, Virginia
