= Press pass =

Card for journalists

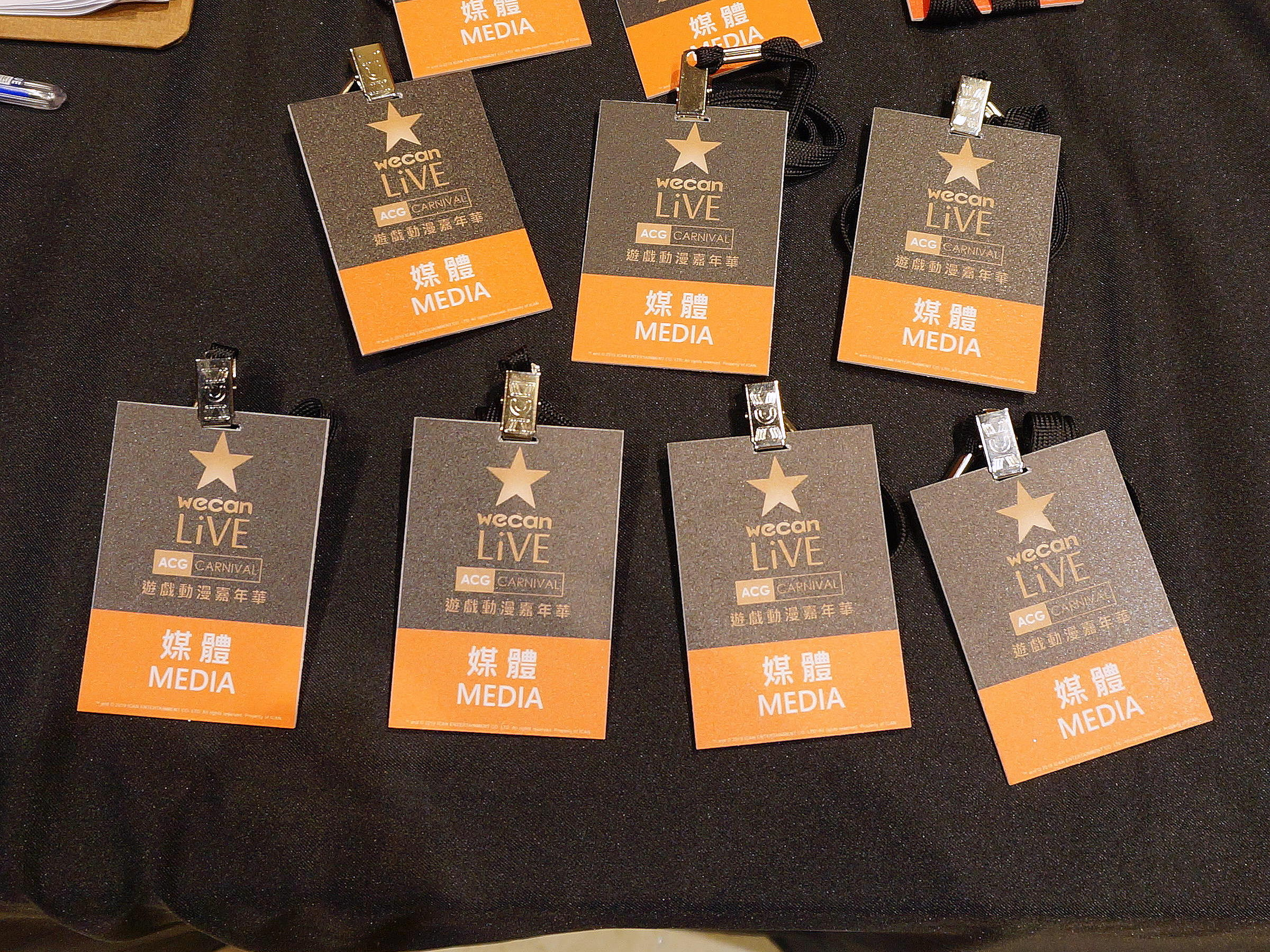
Various press passes given to journalists at an event in Taiwan

A press pass (alternatively referred to as a press card or a journalist pass) grants some type of special privilege to journalists. Some cards have recognized legal status; others merely indicate that the bearer is a practicing journalist. The nature of the benefits is determined by the type of issuing agency, of which there are three major categories: news organizations, law-enforcement agencies, and event organizers (usually for a specific single affair like a corporate press conference). Each type of card grants different authorizations, thus it is often necessary or desirable for reporters to hold multiple press passes simultaneously.

== Government-issued cards ==
In the United Kingdom there is a national, officially recognised Press Card. It is issued by the UK Press Card Authority (UKPCA), which is an organisation owned and controlled by the UK’s major media organisations, industry associations, trades unions, and professional associations. It is the only card issued in the UK to be recognised by the police, other emergency services and government departments.

=== Law-enforcement cards ===
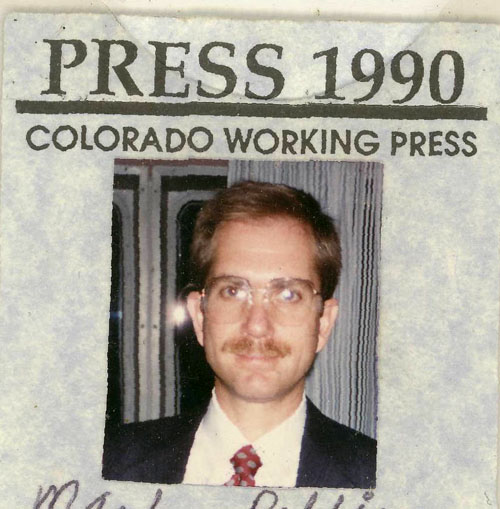
A Denver press pass.

Police departments at a city, county, or state/provincial level may issue press passes in some countries. Such passes allow the bearer to cross police or fire lines to report breaking news, or grant access to crime scenes or other restricted areas though admission may be denied if it would interfere with the duties of emergency personnel. Popular media of the mid-20th century often depicted reporters at a crime scene with their press passes tucked into their hat bands, which was unusual in reality.

Because of the exceptional dispensation endowed by police press passes, they are issued with discretion–some jurisdictions require an in-person interview with all prospective applicants, complete set of fingerprints, and a background check. Generally, only reporters who cover breaking news are eligible; other journalists (feature writers, editors and editorialists, freelance writers, and bloggers) are not.

Police-issued passes do not grant access to government press conferences or any other such privileges: they are only recognized by emergency response personnel, and only valid within the jurisdiction of the issuing agencies.

=== Parking permits ===
Press parking permits may allow the bearer to park in restricted "resident-only" parking zones, and may exempt them from parking-meter costs. These privileges apply only for the duration of breaking-news coverage, and do not nullify all parking restrictions: red zones, fire hydrants, crosswalks, bus zones, disabled parking zones or access ramps, commercial loading zones, taxi cab zones, "no stopping" or "no parking" zones, transit lanes, and other towaway zones are still off-limits.

== Event-specific ==
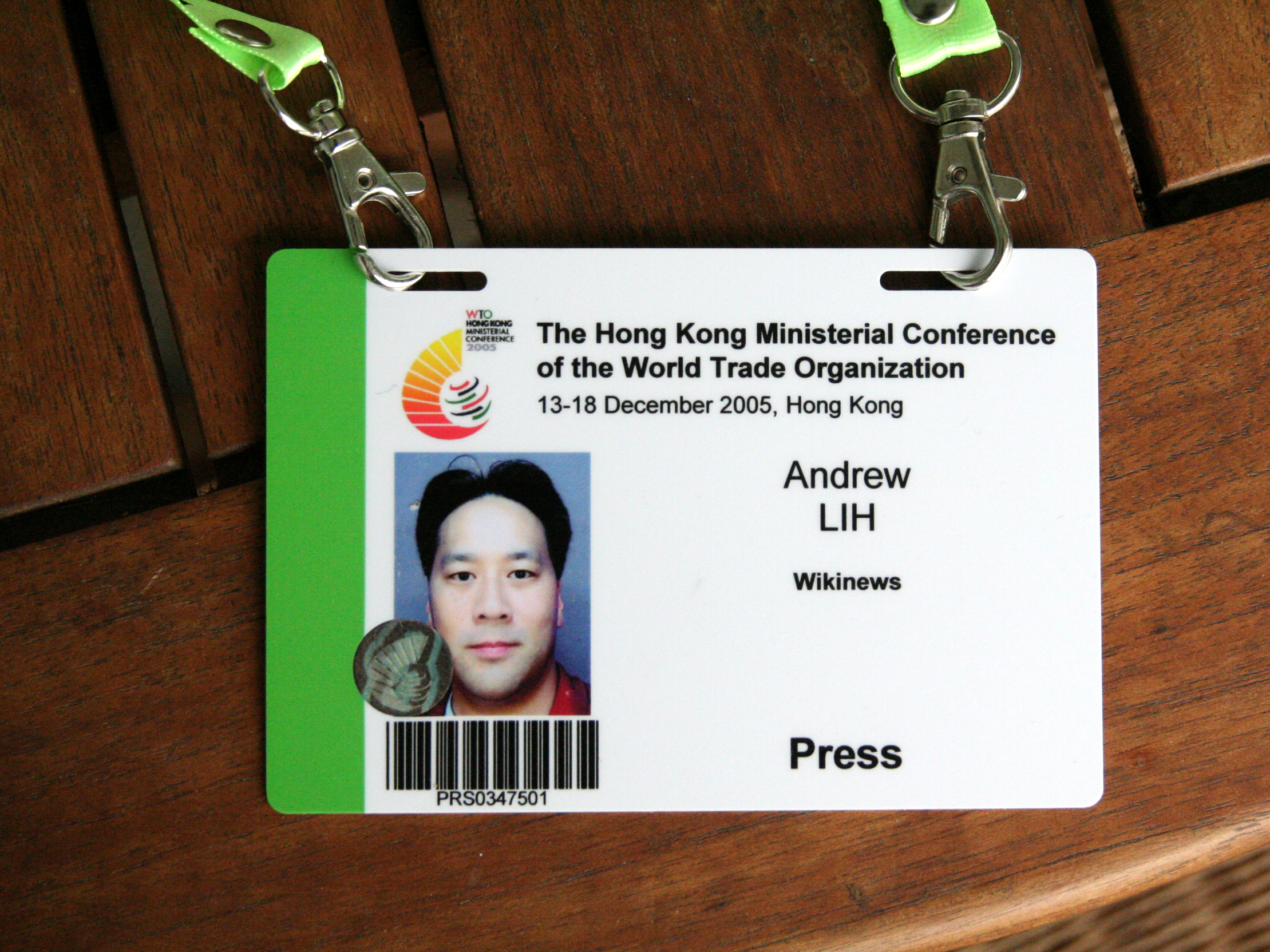
Press pass to the World Trade Organization Ministerial Conference of 2005 in Hong Kong

A video by Voice of America about event-specific press passes at the 2024 Democratic National Convention

Generally, prospective recipients of event-specific passes must apply in advance, offering evidence of their affiliation. Event sponsors may request past published material, or a letter from the news agency on its letterhead, detailing the job assignment. Generally, non-reporting employees of news agencies (executives, sales personnel, publishers, editors, etc.) are not eligible for press passes. In addition to journalists, some bloggers may be granted event passes.

Many major events, especially trade shows, issue press kits to pass-holders. A press pass may allow the bearer to request interviews with noteworthy attendees, and special rooms are sometimes set aside for this purpose.

=== Open events ===
For activities open to the public, such as community gatherings, school events, or trade shows, a police- or media-issued press pass may offer little advantage. Free or reduced-price admission, or guaranteed entry, can sometimes be arranged. The benefits may be more extensive, granting access to front-row seats or to press-only rooms. For sporting events, a press pass issued by a stadium grants access to the press box. Because open events are usually funded by paying attendees, the number of press passes may depend on the number of tickets sold.

=== Closed events ===
For events closed to the general public, police- or news organization-issued press passes sometimes grant access, but almost all require advance application for admittance. Greater exclusivity, however, means more restrictions on potential pass recipients. For professional conferences or trade shows, passes may be granted only to journalists who regularly cover the industry or who hold a title of "industry analyst", or with an editorial or reporting designation.

== News agency cards ==
In the United Kingdom, the UK Press Card Authority (a voluntary consortium of news agencies) issues a nationally standardized card to United Kingdom-based news gatherers.

== Fake cards ==
=== Spurious cards ===
Press passes not issued by a recognised publication can be obtained or made, with the intention of gaining benefits offered to holders of legitimate press cards. Joan Stewart of the Public Relations Society of America reported in 2006: "Fake press passes abound at restaurant and theater openings, sporting events, music festivals, political rallies, celebrity parties and even crime scenes. With a decent computer and color printer, almost anybody can crank out an official-looking pass within minutes."

=== Counterfeit cards ===
Counterfeit copies of cards issued by legitimate publications can be made. Issuers of cards have taken measures to prevent counterfeiting of their cards, creating cards with holographic foil blocking, signature strips, and tamper-resistant lamination.
