= Penrose, Arlington, Virginia =

Penrose is a neighborhood in Arlington County, Virginia, USA, located roughly three miles from Washington, D.C. It is bordered by Joint Base Myer-Henderson Hall to the east, Columbia Pike to the south, S. Walter Reed Drive and S. Fillmore St. to the west and U.S. Route 50 to the north. The Naval Support Facility Arlington is located within the neighborhood boundaries.

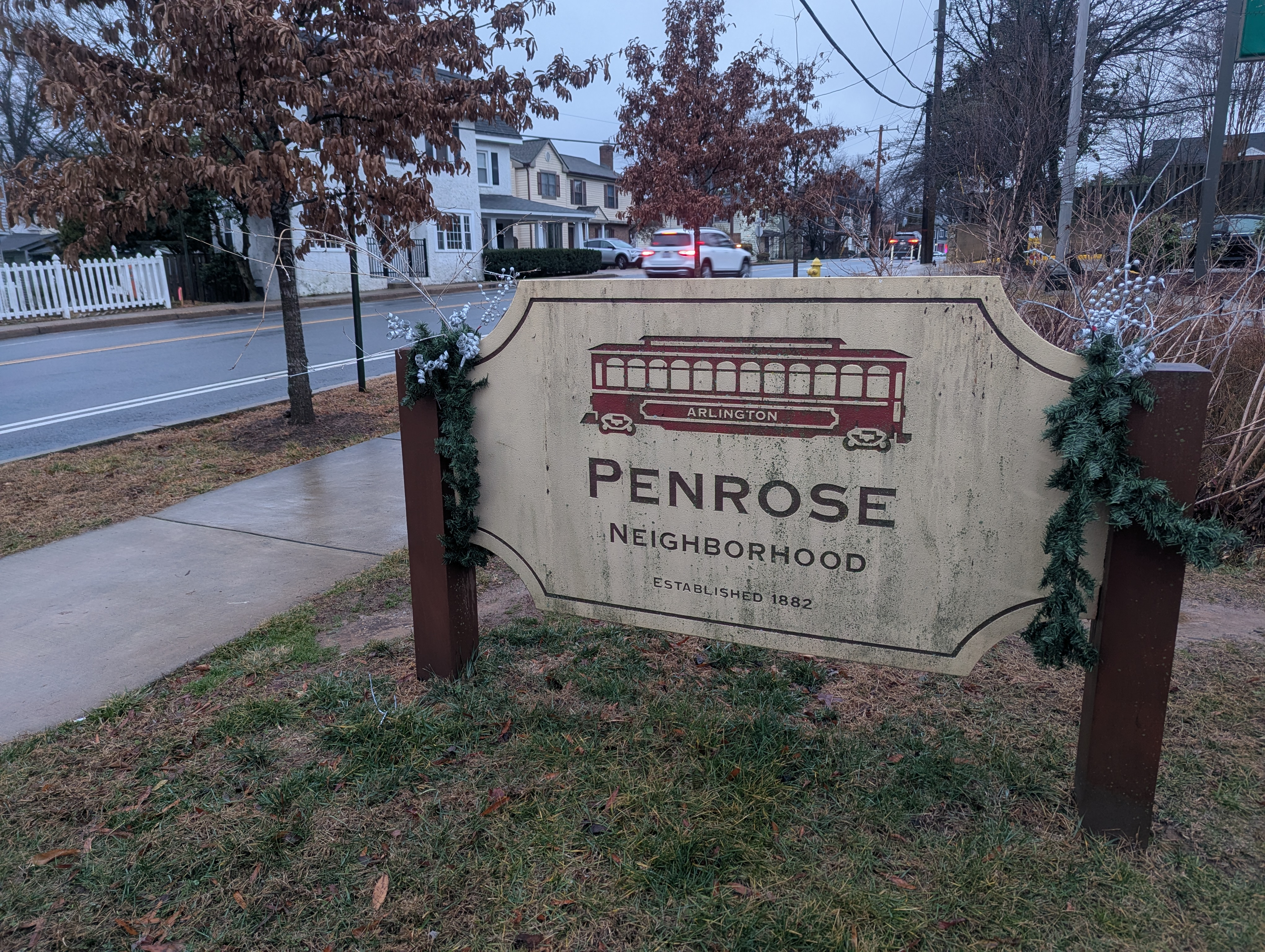
One of the entrances to the neighborhood, placed in front of a raingarden. All four entrances have the neighborhood trolley symbol.

It is a multi-cultural neighborhood which includes houses from the early 1900's up to recent construction. The neighborhood includes the Penrose Historic District. The neighborhood is a mix of single family homes, duplexes, townhouses, condominiums, and apartments. There are three public parks located throughout the neighborhood: Towers Park in the southeast corner of the neighborhood, Penrose Park, located in the center of the neighborhood, and Butler Holmes Park, located in the northern part of the neighborhood.

The southern part of the neighborhood, bordering Columbia Pike, is made up of mixed use commercial and residential buildings, including a number of restaurants and stores.

Penrose is less than 1 mile from Arlington National Cemetery, 2 miles from the Pentagon, the Foreign Service Institute, and Pentagon City and less than 3 miles from Ronald Reagan Washington National Airport and downtown Arlington. Neighboring Arlington neighborhoods include Lyon Park to the north and the Arlington Heights Historic District to the west.

== History ==
In May 1861, Arlington was occupied by federal troops and the Arlington Heights was seized. The troops immediately began the construction of what came to be known as the Arlington Line - comprising Fort Runyon, Fort Corcoran, Fort Albany and Fort Scott. In July 1861, after a federal loss at Bull Run, additional work was also begun on the construction of Fort Ethan Allen, Fort Richardson, and a line of breastworks and lunettes. In August 1861, Fort Craig was constructed at the current Penrose location of South Courthouse Road and South 4th Street as a part of the Arlington Line. Fort Craig had a perimeter of 324 yards and emplacements for 11 guns.

Forests, fields, produce and buildings were confiscated by the troops. By the end of the civil war, timber and wood had become scarce. Farms had lost all their animal stock and many barns and outbuildings had been burned or destroyed for military uses. Arlington Chapel, also known as the Chapel of Ease, was burned by Union soldiers at the start of the war. The congregation was reestablished after the war when it met in abandoned Federal barracks. Trinity Episcopal Church, now located at South Wayne Street and Columbia Pike in Penrose, is the successor congregation to Arlington Chapel.

During Reconstruction, in May 1863 the Bureau of Refugees, Freedmen, and Abandoned Lands established a settlement to ease the transitions from servitude to freedom and from wartime to peace. Beyond the provision of assistance to African Americans, the Bureau provided freed people with housing and opportunities for work, training and education. Just south of the Custis Arlington Estate, Freedman's Village was built and formally dedicated on December 4, 1863 on the south east corner of the future Penrose neighborhood.

In 1879, two farmers and laborers who were community leaders in Freedman's Village, William H. Butler and Henry Louis Holmes, purchased parcels of land west of Fort Myer. They built their own homes here, relocating with their families around 1879, and improved the area with substantial construction of freestanding dwellings. Previously enslaved, Holmes had come to Freedman’s Village in Arlington in his early life. He gained political success in the Reconstruction-era boom of Black political leaders, and was involved with the Radical Republican party, as well as in fraternal organizations such as the Masons and Odd Fellows and as a trustee of St. John’s Baptist Church located at the intersection of Columbia Pike and South Scott Street. He also served as commissioner of Revenue between 1876 and 1903. The official "colored branch" of the Arlington Library system (1944-1950) was named after him. Holmes passed away in 1905 and his widow occupied the second Holmes family house at 2803 S. 2nd St. until her death in the 1960s. William Butler served as Commissioner of Roads in 1879 and later as Surveyor of Roads throughout the 1880s, as well as Superintendent of the Poor. In 1879, Butler constructed a wood frame Queen-Anne style home at 2407 South 2nd Street. Arlington County named a public park for Butler and Holmes in recognition of their community services. The park is located within the original subdivision at 101 South Barton Street.

In 1882, the neighborhood was ultimately platted as the Butler-Holmes subdivision. Because of its proximity to Freedman's Village and the lack of restrictive covenants, the Butler Holmes subdivision became home to many African Americans. The most famous resident was Dr. Charles Drew, an African American who gained international acclaim for his scientific advances in the field of blood plasma transfusion research. He was the first African American to receive a Doctor of Science in Medicine and he became Head of the Surgery Department at Howard University. His 1910 era home, where he resided until 1939, is located at 2505 South 1st Street and has been designated a National Historic Landmark. The Butler-Holmes subdivision was the first of several subdivisions that would together become modern-day Penrose.

From the 1890s into the first part of the 20th century, this neighborhood saw a substantial population increase as a result of the introduction of the Fort Meyer Branch of the Washington-Alexandria and Falls Church commuter railway that connected the community to Rosslyn, Georgetown and the District of Columbia. The neighborhood grew into a working-class community with laborers and workers who supported North Arlington and Washington, D.C. Trolley cars cut through Penrose along South Fillmore Street and South Second Street and connected with the Washington-Virginia line at Hunter Station near the intersection of South 2nd Street and South Wayne Street within the Butler Holmes subdivision. The building is now a private dwelling. This particular station, which gave residents a direct connection to Washington, D.C., was located just south of where the Washington, Arlington and Fairfax Electric Railway lines intersected with the trolley line. The Columbia Station located at Columbia Pike and Walter Reed Drive was also located in modern day Penrose. Penrose Station was one of the stops on the Nauck Line between Hunter and Columbia.

The name Penrose is derived from one of the historical trolley stops on the old Georgetown-Nauck line. Since the name change, the trolley has become the neighborhood symbol and can be found on the neighborhood identification signs at four gateway locations.

In 1926, there were approximately 70 houses in Penrose. Following the opening of Arlington Boulevard Route 50 in the 1930s and the growth of federal government agencies in Washington and nearby military establishments, the neighborhood grew to 175 buildings and several churches. During the early part of the community's development, homes included a number of vernacular, Queen Anne and Italianate-style dwellings constructed primarily of wood frame. During the 1910s and 1920s, homes consisted of mainly wood-frame bungalows and vernacular dwellings. A common practice at this time in Arlington County was the kit house or mail-order house. The rail line facilitated the building of many kit homes in Penrose since it allowed for easy shipping of materials.

Many commercial buildings lie along the southern edge of the neighborhood along just north of Columbia Pike. These were primarily constructed during the mid-to-late 20th century, fueled by the increased population growth between the wars. The main commercial corridor stretches along the southern boundary and beyond and includes restaurants, grocery stores and other retail establishments that serve Penrose and automobile traffic along Columbia Pike. Several of the original storefront buildings remain standing today, including the building historically associated with Fillmore Garden on the north side of Columbia Pike at South Walter Reed Drive.

With the birth of the Pentagon in the 1940s, several garden style apartment communities were built to accommodate the influx of federal workers including Fillmore Gardens and Fort Craig Apartments (now the Executive Suites Hotel). Fillmore Gardens, which received an award for architectural merit in 1943 from the Washington Board of Trade, was built on a twenty-acre tract of land, but also led to the demolition of the Sewell Corbett/Bradbury House and the Arlington M.E. Church.

In the 1960's Butler Holmes was merged with part of Arlington Heights to form Central Arlington, though in 1995, a citizens' initiative moved that the neighborhood's name be changed to reflect the unique history and character of the area. The community decided upon Penrose, which was a reference to a trolley station that once stood in prominently in the neighborhood. The official name Penrose is derived from one of the historical trolley stops on the old Georgetown-Nauck line. Since the name change, the trolley has become the neighborhood symbol and can be found on the neighborhood identification signs at four gateway locations.

== Neighborhood ==
=== Demographics ===
The 2020 population was 5,607 and 70% rent rather than own. Early 1900s Cape Cods and brick Colonial Revivals sit beside newer New Traditional or Craftsman-style homes. Townhouses are also available, resembling attached colonial-style properties. The two closest metro lines are the blue (at Pentagon or Pentagon City) or Orange/Silver (at Clarendon or Courthouse), due to the nature of the geography and routes, the neighborhood is almost equidistant from all four at ~2 mi.

In 2025, the median age was 37 with a density of 16 ppl/acre. 15% of households had children with the under 18 population at 20% the total. The population over 65 was 11%, below the national average of 19%. The median household income trends above the national average due to the proximity to D.C., with 75%of the adults having a college degree. Penrose is entirely urban. The racial makeup of the county was 53% White, 13% Black or African American, and 10% Asian. Hispanic or Latino residents of any race comprised 20% of the population

=== Parks ===
The neighborhood of Penrose contains several parks. These are are:

- Penrose Park, located at 6th and Wayne Street
- Butler Holmes Park, located at 101 South Barton Street
- Towers Park, located at 801 South Scott Street
