= Overspill parking =

Parking of vehicles outside designated areas

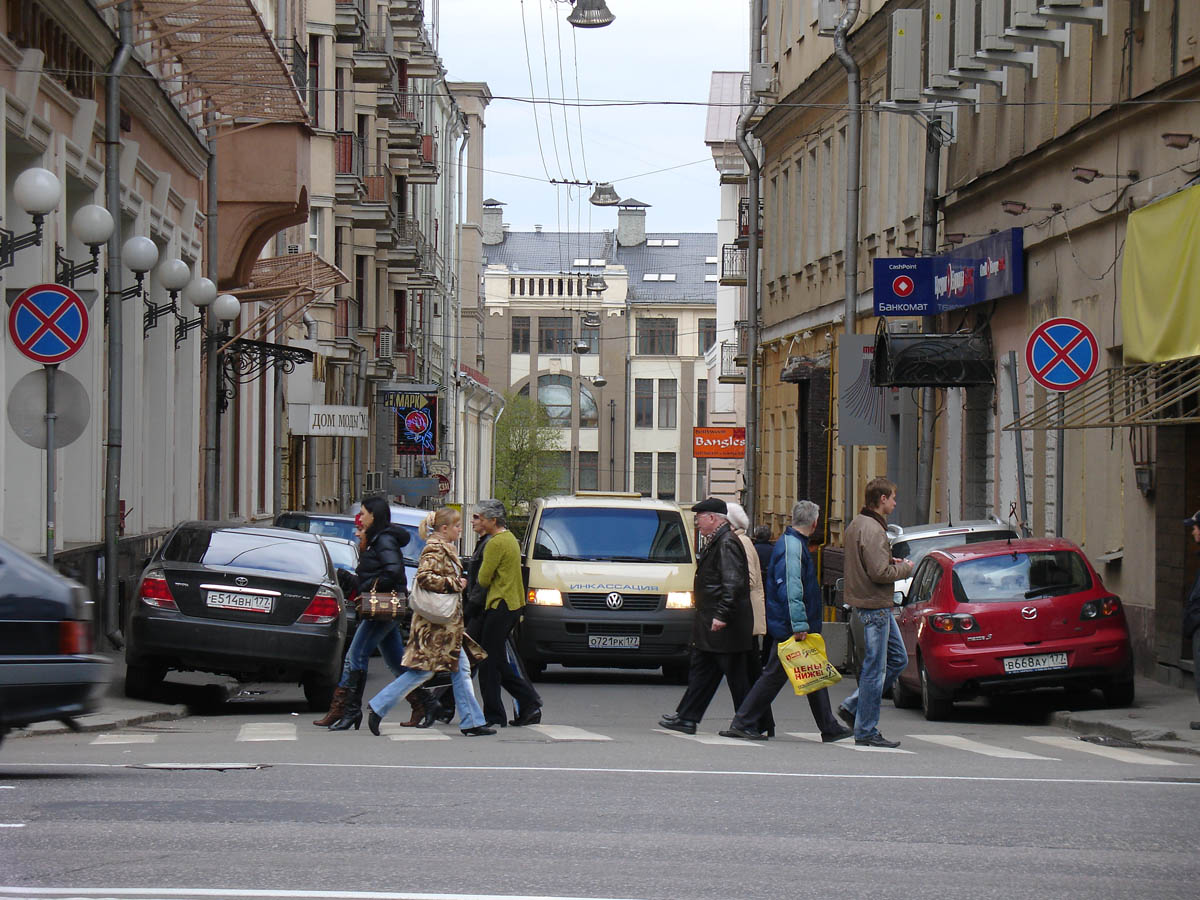
Cars parked on the sidewalk in Moscow

Overspill parking is the parking of vehicles outside of designated areas due to insufficient or inadequate parking spaces. This can have unintended consequences on the surrounding area. Additional parking may be provided for events or located further away from the intended destination.

Overspill car parking may simply be parking further away from a desired location. It can involve parking violations, unauthorised or anti-social parking practices like double parking, parking on verges or sidewalks, causing inconvenience to others.

Insufficient, unsuitable, expensive, or undesirable parking may be due to historical lack of provision for private vehicle parking or intentional zoning policies limiting parking spaces to discourage car use. Overspill parking is common near shops, schools, hospitals, sports grounds, and train/metro stations. Commuters may park on side streets, verges, or other locations when unable to find parking close to train stations for the day.

Overspill parking can create conflicts with other road users, including motorists, emergency vehicles, cyclists, pedestrians, and vulnerable groups like the blind, wheelchair, and families with small children. Parking on grass can turn the area to mud in wet weather, while parking on sidewalks can cause damage and increase maintenance costs, prompting the need for preventative measures.

== Reaction ==
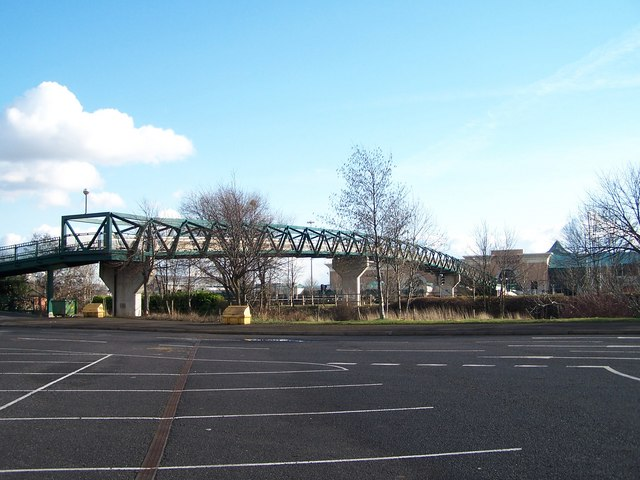
Overspill car park for a shopping centre, accessible from a footbridge.

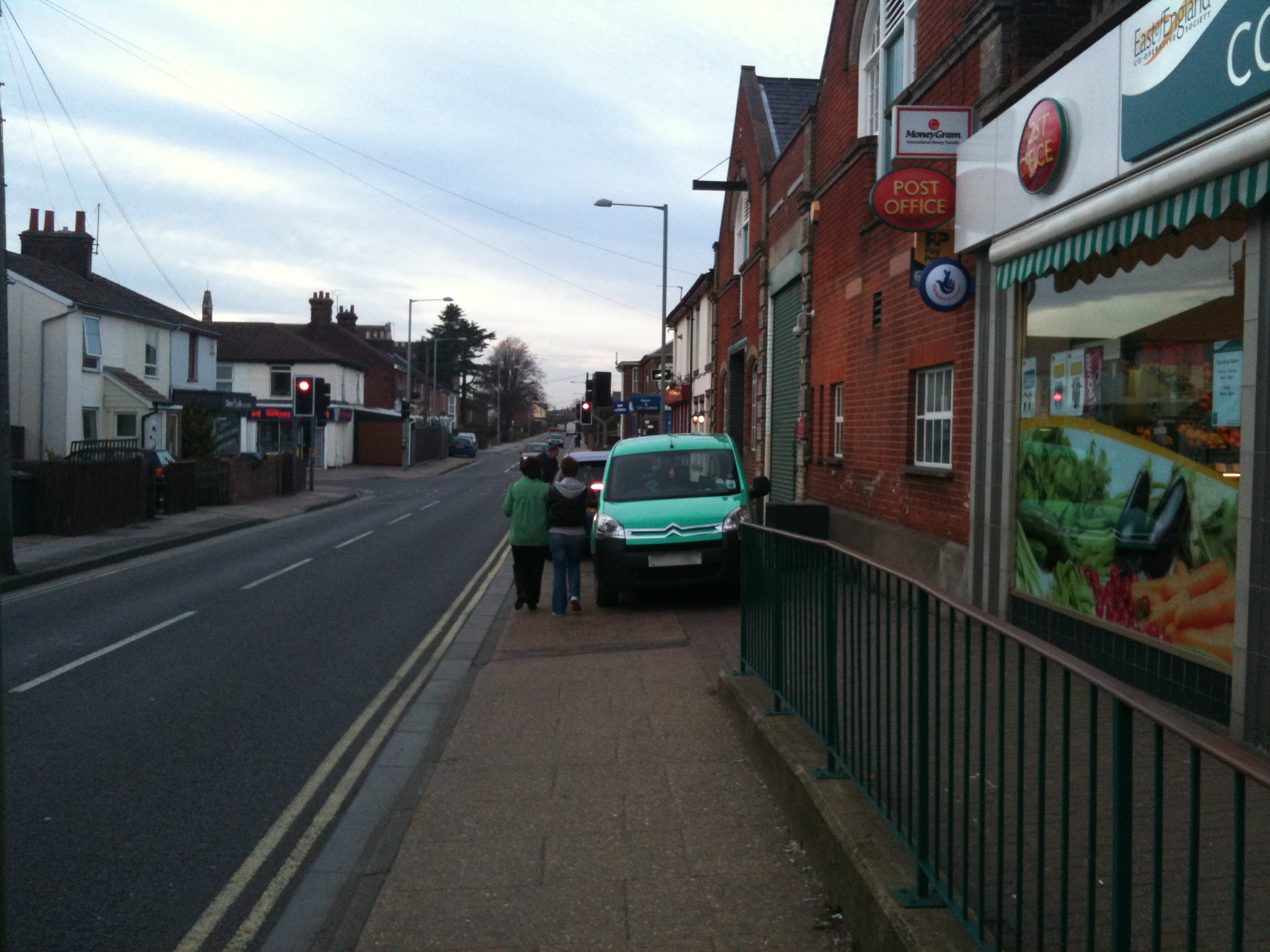
Pedestrians walk near the road to navigate around cars parked on the pavement; double yellow lines indicate no parking.

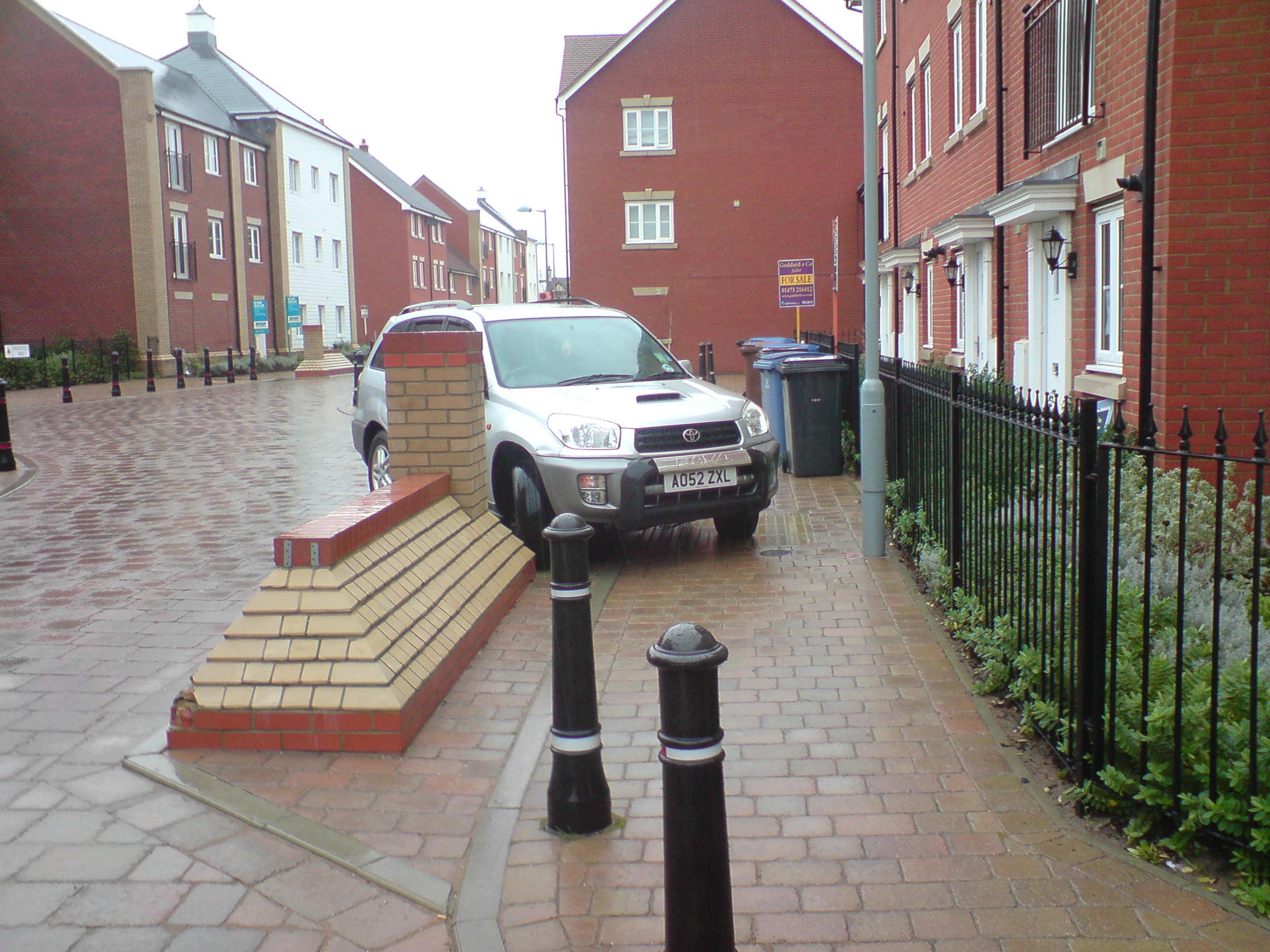
Bollards and brick pillars in a residential area with a car parked diagonally on the pavement.

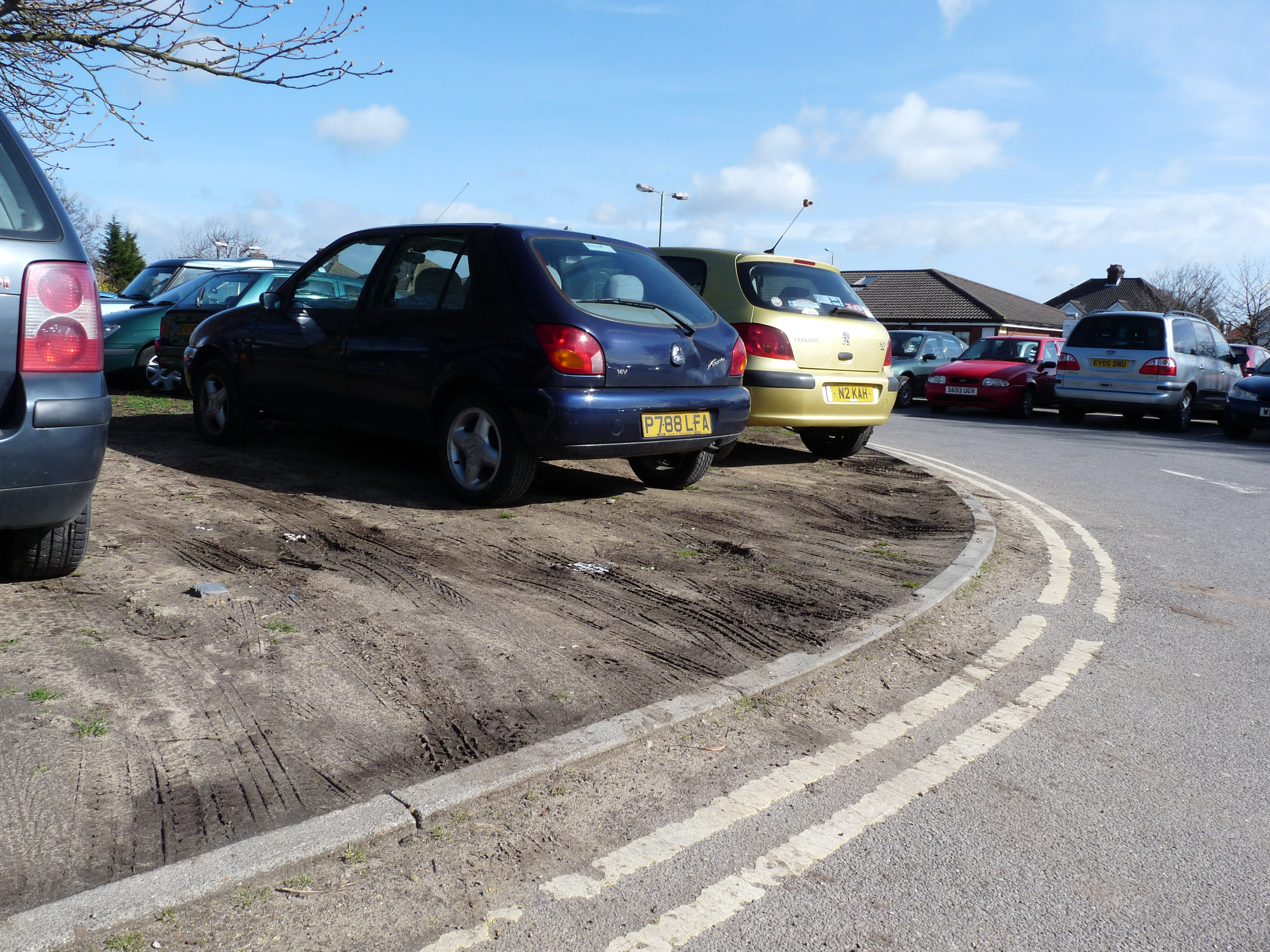
Cars parked on grass in a hospital parking lot, causing the area to become muddy.

Policy makers may address overspill parking by accepting it as inevitable, providing more parking spaces, or implementing legislative or physical measures to control parking locations. Design elements like bollards, high kerbs, railings, benches, raised planters, and street furniture can be used to prevent parking on footways.

Parking restrictions can include limited time periods, specific times of day, and designated user categories. Examples include residential zoned parking, disabled parking bays, metered bays, and no-parking zones.

In a 1992 referendum in Amsterdam, residents voted to decrease the provision of the city's parking availability.

=== More parking spaces ===
Authorities may create additional parking options and guide users to those facilities. For example, Chelsea Football Club considered overspill parking when developing the 'Chelsea Football Club Academy' for reserve team matches. Similarly, the town of Southwold offers extra parking during peak summer periods.

=== Information campaigns ===
Transport authorities often conduct campaigns to raise awareness about the costs and inconveniences of overspill parking.

Living Streets in the United Kingdom leads a 'Campaign for combat pavement parking', offering suggestions to reduce the issue.

'Car exclusion zones' around schools during drop-off and collection times are implemented voluntarily or compulsorily to improve pedestrian safety and reduce traffic congestion caused by parents using cars.

Streetfilms has created videos showcasing pedestrian issues, benefits of addressing them, and potential solutions.

== Regional issues ==
=== United Kingdom ===
In June 2006, the House of Commons Transport Select Committee released a report on 'Parking Policy and Enforcement'. The report highlighted the issue of pavement parking, especially near schools, hospitals, and on corners, junctions, and bus stops. It criticised the Department for Transport for its perceived 'do-nothing' attitude and said that the government "must grip the problem of pavement parking once and for all and ensure that it is outlawed throughout the country".
