= Aurora Highlands Historic District =

Historic district in Virginia, United States

- U.S. National Register of Historic Places
- U.S. Historic district
- Virginia Landmarks Register
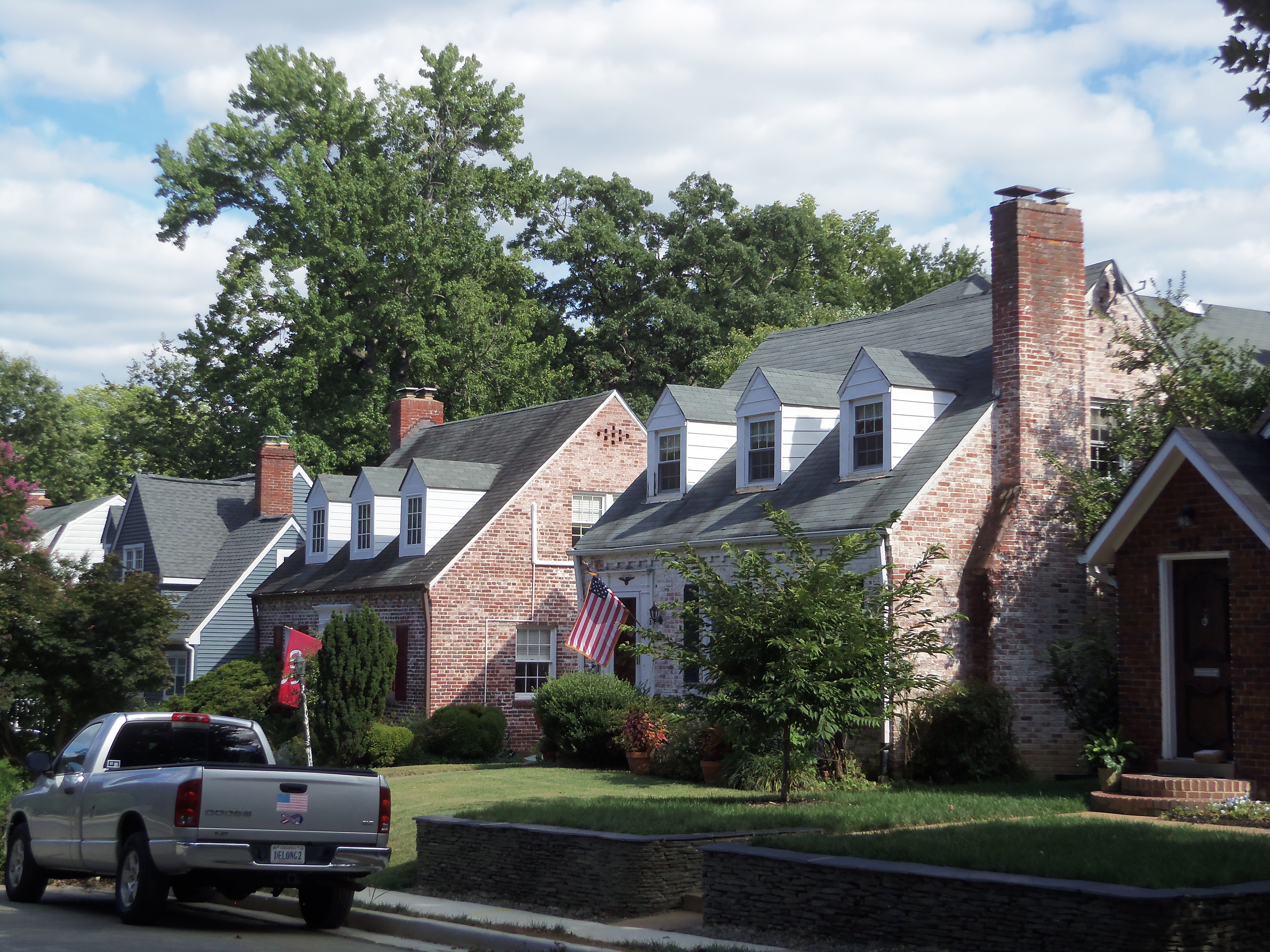

- Location within District of Columbia Location within Virginia Location within the United States
- Location: Bounded by 16th St. S., S. Eads St., 26th St. S., and S. Joyce St., Arlington, Virginia
- Coordinates: 38°51′31″N 77°3′49″W
- Area: 128.8 acres (52.1 ha)
- Built: 1896-1930
- Architect: Morrill, Milton Dana; et al.
- Architectural style: Greek Revival, Colonial Revival, Italianate
- MPS: Historic Residential Suburbs in the United States, 1830-1960 MPS
- NRHP reference No.: 08001018
- VLR No.: 000-9706

Significant dates
- Added to NRHP: October 22, 2008
- Designated VLR: March 20, 2008

The Aurora Highlands Historic District is a national historic district located at Arlington County, Virginia. It contains 624 contributing buildings, 2 contributing sites, and 1 contributing structure in a residential neighborhood in South Arlington. Aurora Highlands was formed by the integration of three subdivisions platted between 1896 and 1930, with improvements in the form of modest single-family residences. The district is characterized by single family dwellings with a number of twin dwellings and duplexes, three churches, a rectory, two schools, two landscaped parks, and commercial buildings. The oldest dwelling is associated with “Sunnydale Farm” and is a Greek Revival-style dwelling built about 1870. The predominant architectural style represented is Colonial Revival.

In the early 1970s, spillover commuter parking in Aurora Highlands by workers at the adjacent Crystal City complex led the county to establish the first residential zoned parking in the U.S. with the goal of reducing air pollution and protecting the neighborhood character as well as its quality of life. A lawsuit was filed to block it as a violation of the Equal Protection Clause of the Fourteenth Amendment. The plaintiffs prevailed in trial court and then on appeal to the Virginia Supreme Court, which held it unconstitutional since it granted residents of the permit zone greater rights over the public streets than their neighbors outside of it. The county appealed to the U.S. Supreme Court, which reversed the lower courts in Arlington County Board v. Richards, holding that discrimination based on residency alone was not unconstitutional if it rationally furthered a legitimate state interest such as those embraced by the ordinance.

It was listed on the National Register of Historic Places in 2005.

== See also ==
- National Register of Historic Places listings in Arlington County, Virginia
