= Walter Reed Gardens Historic District =

Historic district in Virginia, United States

- U.S. National Register of Historic Places
- U.S. Historic district
- Virginia Landmarks Register
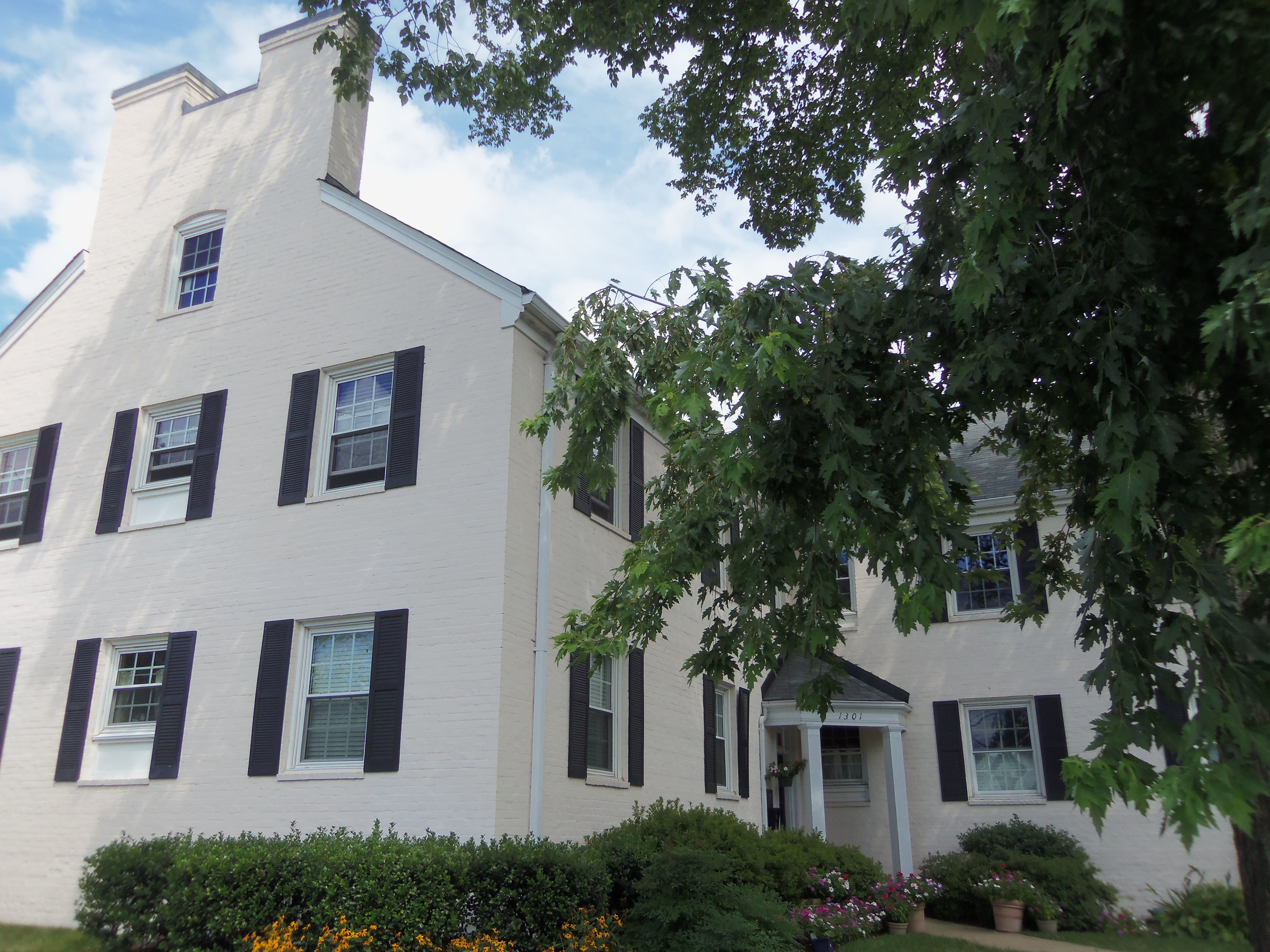

- Location within District of Columbia Location within Virginia Location within the United States
- Location: 2900-2906 13th St. S., 2900-2914 13th Rd. S., 1301-1319 S. Walter Reed Dr., Arlington, Virginia
- Coordinates: 38°51′33″N 77°5′13″W
- Area: 5.3 acres (2.1 ha)
- Built: 1948
- Architectural style: Colonial Revival
- MPS: Garden Apartments, Apartment Houses and Apartment Complexes in Arlington County, Virginia MPS
- NRHP reference No.: 03000451
- VLR No.: 000-8824

Significant dates
- Added to NRHP: May 22, 2003
- Designated VLR: December 4, 2002

The Walter Reed Gardens Historic District, also known as Commons of Arlington, is a national historic district located in Arlington County, Virginia. It contains 18 contributing buildings in a residential neighborhood in South Arlington. The two- and three-story, brick garden apartment complex was built in 1948, in the Colonial Revival style. It was converted to condominiums in 1982–1984, and has 134 units, include 56 one bedroom units and 78 two-bedroom units in four clusters of buildings.

It was listed on the National Register of Historic Places in 2003.
