= Charles Richard Drew House =

Historic house in Virginia, United States

- U.S. National Register of Historic Places
- U.S. National Historic Landmark
- Virginia Landmarks Register
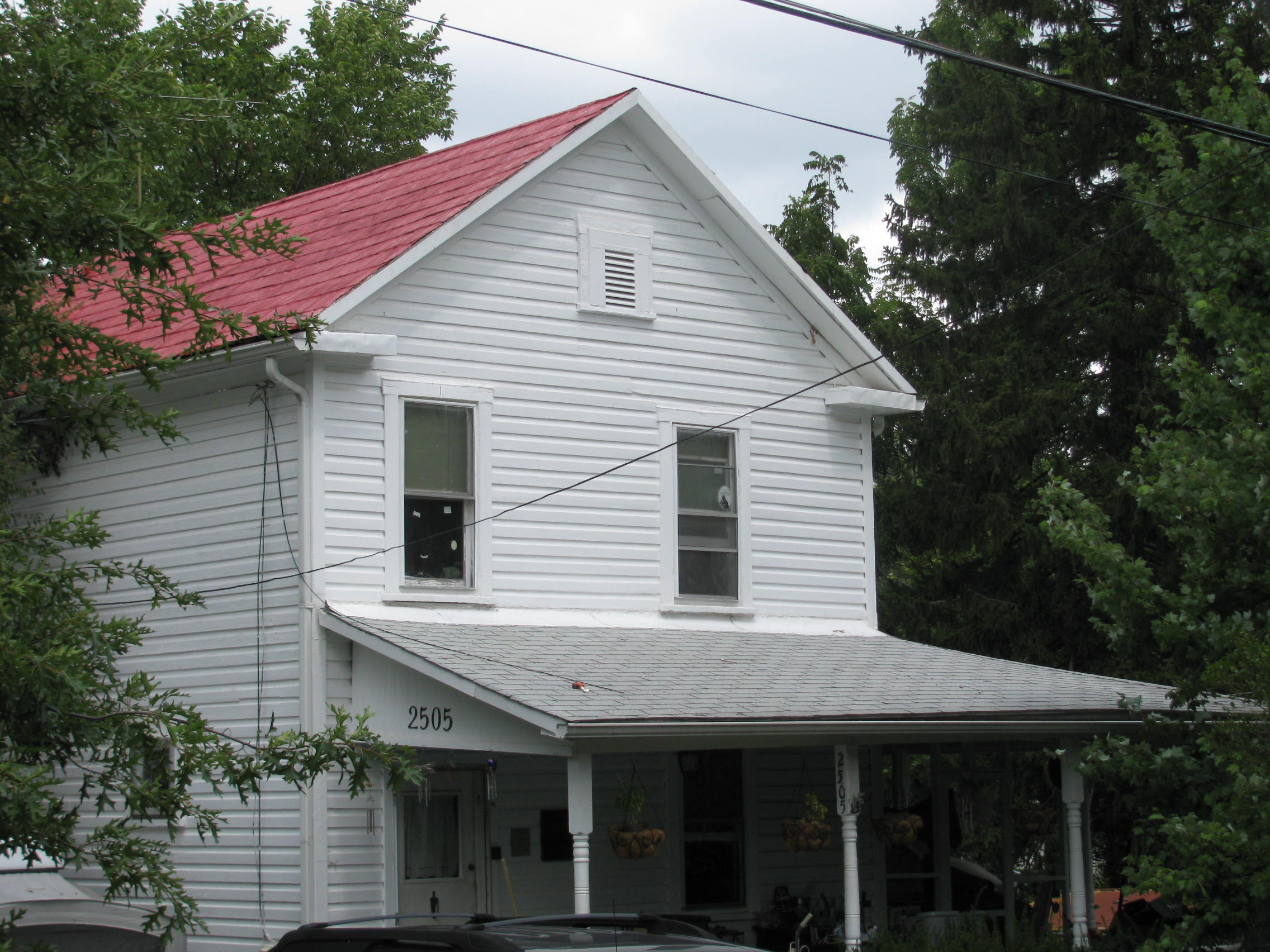
- Charles Richard Drew House, September 2012

- Location within District of Columbia Location within Virginia Location within the United States
- Location: 2505 1st Street, South Arlington, Virginia
- Coordinates: 38°52′22″N 77°5′14″W
- NRHP reference No.: 76002095
- VLR No.: 000-0016

Significant dates
- Added to NRHP: May 11, 1976
- Designated NHL: May 11, 1976
- Designated VLR: February 15, 1977

The Charles Richard Drew House is a historic house at 2505 1st Street in Arlington, Virginia. A vernacular early 20th-century dwelling, it is of national significance as the home from 1920 to 1939 of Charles Richard Drew (1904–50), an African-American physician whose leadership on stockpiling of blood plasma saved lives during World War II. The National Park Service designated the house as a National Historic Landmark in 1976 in response to a nomination by the Afro-American Bicentennial Corporation.

== Description and history ==
The Drew House is located in a modest residential area in central Arlington, just northeast of the corner of 1st Street South and South Cleveland Street. It is a narrow two-story frame structure covered with wood clapboards and topped with a gabled roof. Originally a four-room house, the house was expanded with a two-room two-story addition during Drew's ownership. The house is arranged around a side stair hall, which is also the entry. From front to back the first floor comprises the living room, dining room and kitchen. Upstairs are two bedrooms and a den.

The house was the home from 1920 to 1939 of Charles Richard Drew. Drew, educated at Amherst College, McGill University, and Columbia University, conducted research in blood transfusion, and in particular the banking of blood, which was known to degenerate rapidly after removal from its donor. By the outbreak of World War II he had demonstrated that blood plasma could be stored virtually indefinitely under the proper conditions. Drew was placed in charge of a program under which blood plasma was sent to Great Britain in the early years of the war, which was continued when the United States entered the war. Drew eventually resigned from the program over racist policies enacted by the government that segregated the stockpiled blood by race. He was afterward a leading figure at Howard University and elsewhere in the training of a whole generation of African-American doctors.

== See also ==
- List of National Historic Landmarks in Virginia
- National Register of Historic Places listings in Arlington County, Virginia
