= Earle Micajah Winslow House =

Historic house in Virginia, United States

- U.S. National Register of Historic Places
- Virginia Landmarks Register
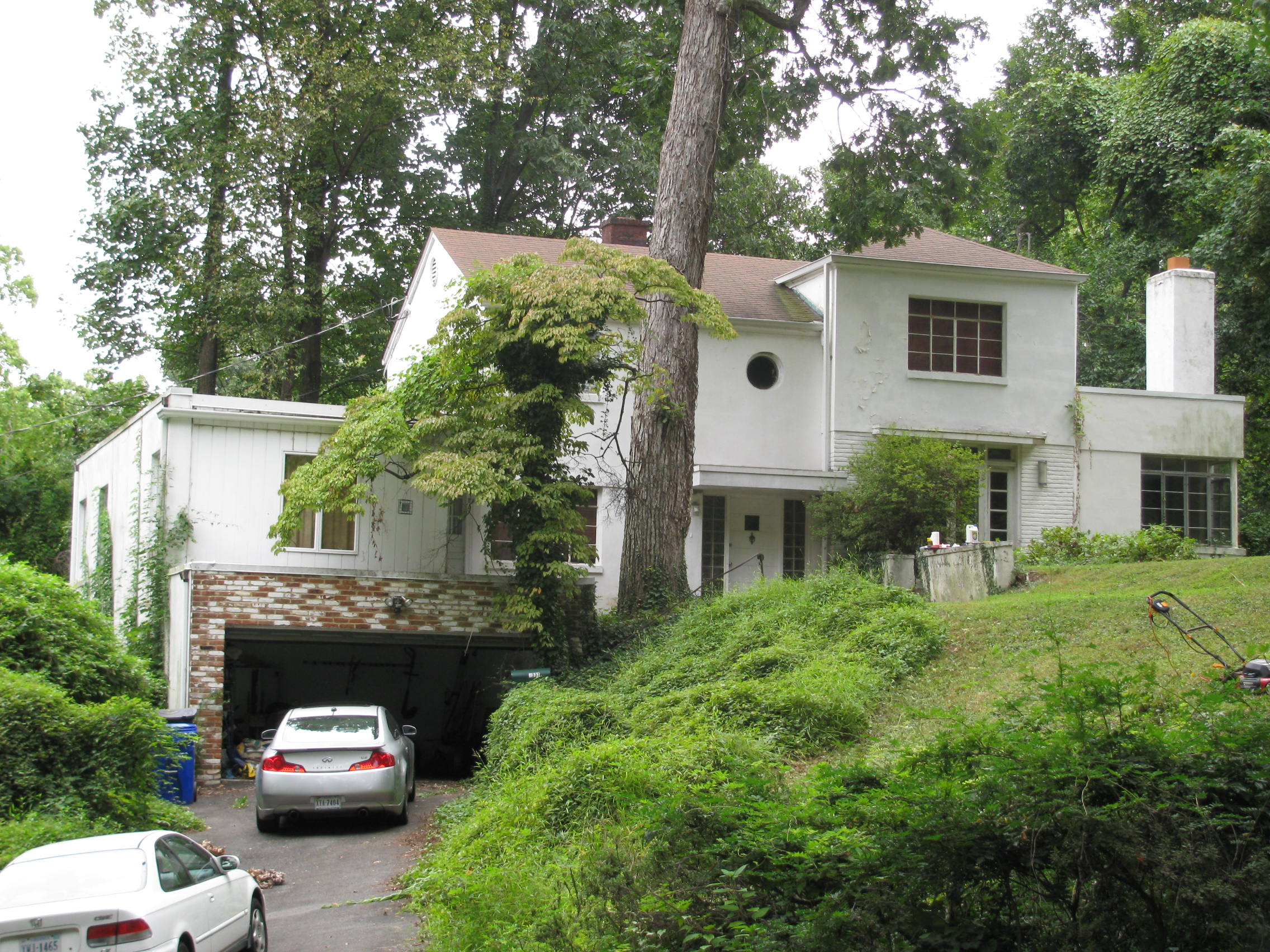
- Earle Micajah Winslow House, September 2012

- Location within District of Columbia Location within Virginia Location within the United States
- Location: 2333 N. Vernon St., Arlington, Virginia
- Coordinates: 38°54′06″N 77°07′09″W
- Area: less than one acre
- Built: 1940
- Built by: Henry, Ira
- Architect: Hamaker, Kenton
- Architectural style: Streamline Moderne
- MPS: Streamline Modern Houses in Arlington County, Va 1936-1945 MPS
- NRHP reference No.: 11000028
- VLR No.: 000-2633

Significant dates
- Added to NRHP: February 22, 2011
- Designated VLR: December 16, 2010

Earle Micajah Winslow House is a historic home located at Arlington County, Virginia. It was built in 1940, and is a two-story, concrete block structure veneered in brick and covered in a smooth stucco finish that is painted white. It has a shallow-pitched, side-gabled roof. A square projecting bay has a flat roof and a curved bay is crowned by a conical roof and a shallow hipped roof. The house features smooth walls, flat and shallow-pitched roofs, bands of wrapping windows, rounded corners, and a complete lack of applied ornamentation in the Streamline Moderne style.

It was listed on the National Register of Historic Places in 2011.
