= Claremont Historic District =

Historic district in Virginia, United States

- U.S. National Register of Historic Places
- U.S. Historic district
- Virginia Landmarks Register
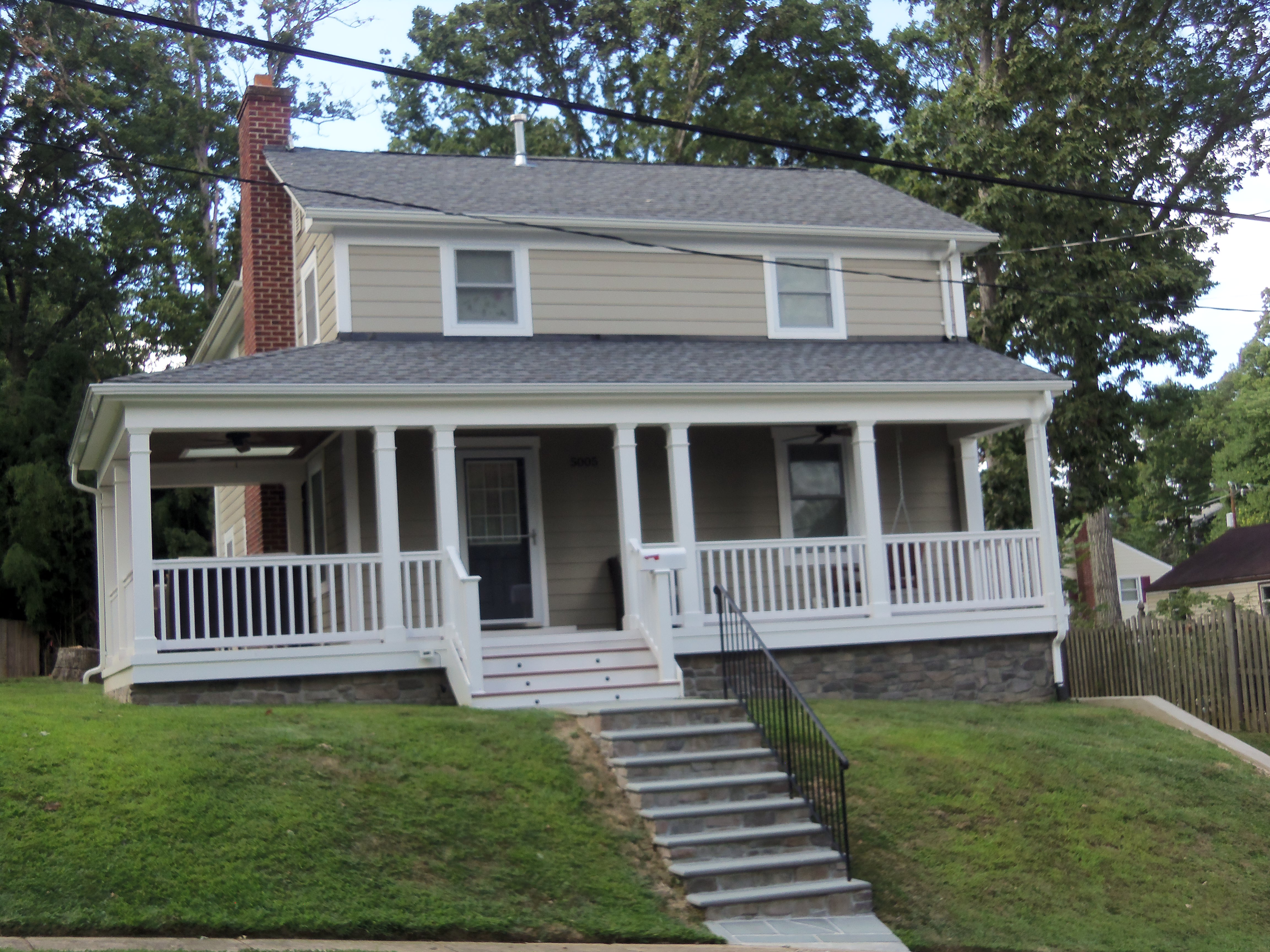

- Location within District of Columbia Location within Virginia Location within the United States
- Location: Bounded by S. Greenbrier St., S. Chesterfield Rd., S. Buchanan St., 25th St. S, 24th St. S, 23rd St. S and 22nd St. S, Arlington, Virginia
- Coordinates: 38°50′47″N 77°6′20″W
- Area: 58.9 acres (23.8 ha)
- Built: 1946
- Architect: Banks and Lee; Freed, Gerald and Claremont et al.
- Architectural style: Colonial Revival, Modern Movement
- MPS: Historic Residential Suburbs in the United States, 1830-1960 MPS
- NRHP reference No.: 06000751
- VLR No.: 000-9700

Significant dates
- Added to NRHP: August 31, 2006
- Designated VLR: June 8, 2006, December 13, 2006

The Claremont Historic District is a national historic district located at Arlington County, Virginia. It contains 253 contributing buildings in a residential neighborhood in southwestern Arlington. The area was developed initially between 1946 and 1949, of two-story Colonial Revival style houses and 1 1/2-story Cape Cod style houses. In 1954, thirty-six Ranch-style houses were added.

It was listed on the National Register of Historic Places in 2006.
