= Arlington County Board v. Richards =

- Supreme Court of the United States

Decided October 11, 1977
- Full case name: Rudolph Richards et al v. County Board of Arlington County, Virginia
- Docket no.: 76-1418
- Citations: 434 U.S. 5 (more) 98 S.Ct. 24; 54 L.Ed.2d 4; 1977 U.S. LEXIS 26

Case history
- Prior: 231 S.E.2d 231 (Va., 1977)
- Subsequent: Reh denied, 434 U.S. 976, 98 S.Ct. 535, 54 L.Ed.2d 468

Holding
- Local ordinance limiting parking in a designated area during business hours to residents and visitors only was rationally related to public goals of improving quality of life, protecting neighborhood character and reducing dependence on automobile usage; legal distinctions between residents and non-residents are sometimes inevitable and do not by themselves violate the Equal Protection Clause. Supreme Court of Virginia reversed.

Court membership
- Chief Justice Warren E. Burger Associate Justices William J. Brennan Jr. · Potter Stewart; Byron White · Thurgood Marshall; Harry Blackmun · Lewis F. Powell Jr. William Rehnquist · John P. Stevens

Case opinion
- Per curiam

Laws applied
- U.S. Const. Amdt. XIV

Arlington County Board v. Richards, 434 U.S. 5 (1977), is a United States Supreme Court decision on the application of the Equal Protection Clause of the Fourteenth Amendment to the Constitution to municipal parking restrictions. In a unanimous per curiam opinion, the Court held that a residential zoned parking system requiring permits for daytime parking in the Aurora Highlands neighborhood of Arlington County, Virginia, with those permits limited to residents, their guests and those who came to their homes for business purposes had a rational basis and was thus constitutional. Its decision overturned the Virginia Supreme Court.

The ordinance upheld the first such program in a major U.S. metropolitan area, which had been adopted by the county three years earlier in response to national and local concerns. The former was an effort by urban planners and government agencies to reduce automobile use, and conversely encourage the use of public transit and carpooling to address traffic congestion and air pollution concerns. Locally, Aurora Highlands residents were complaining about increasing spillover parking on their streets by workers commuting to nearby Crystal City from elsewhere in the Washington metropolitan area.

Suit was brought by several plaintiffs. Most were drivers who routinely parked in Aurora Highlands; the lead plaintiff, Rudolph Richards, lived a block outside of the area designated by the ordinance. While he was able to walk to work, he argued that it was unconstitutional since it allowed residents of the designated area to park in front of his house while he could not park in front of theirs. The trial court and the Virginia Supreme Court agreed, but the U.S. Supreme Court, which decided the case purely based on the parties' briefs without granting certiorari, found the law a permissible way of carrying out the stated objectives of preserving the neighborhood character and residents' quality of life and that legal distinctions between residents and nonresidents of a particular area are not necessarily the invidious discrimination it had held to be forbidden by the Fourteenth Amendment.

The decision resolved a difference of opinion among state high courts, as earlier in the year the Massachusetts Supreme Judicial Court had held a similar scheme in that state to be constitutional, mildly criticizing its Virginia counterpart in the process. After the decision, local governments felt more freedom to impose locally targeted parking and traffic rules. The Court has not revisited Richards since then, although it and other courts have relied on its holding that distinctions on the basis of residency, not just in parking but in taxation policy and responses to the COVID-19 pandemic, do not by themselves offend the Constitution. Legal commentary has accepted this conclusion, but there has been concern in the planning community that it has enabled, through qualifications on the definition of residency, the entrenchment of residential racial segregation in some areas.

== Background ==
Since returning to Virginia as one of the country's smallest counties in the mid-19th century after almost 50 years as part of the District of Columbia, Arlington had largely remained quiet, minimally developed and rural. Suburban development began in southern Arlington County in the 1890s with Addison Heights, the first of three subdivisions platted that would later be combined and resubdivided to become the neighborhood now the 128-acre (52 ha) Aurora Highlands Historic District, listed on the National Register of Historic Places in 2008. The properties were marketed as easily accessible to downtown Washington via bus and trolley.

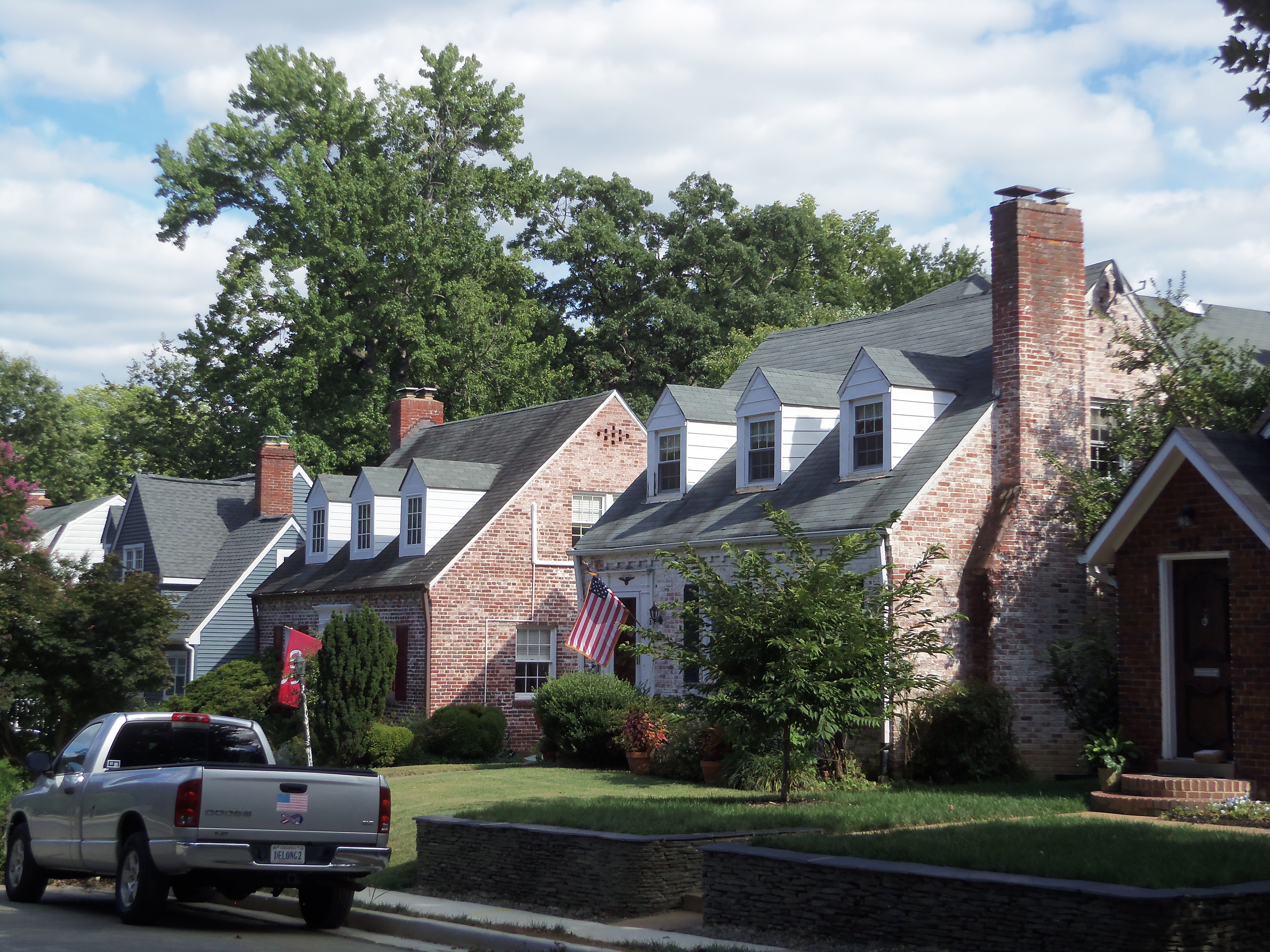
Houses in Aurora Highlands, 2013

The area developed slowly over the early 20th century, primarily as a residential neighborhood of modest houses with narrow streets. During World War II, the large office building that became known as The Pentagon for its shape was built to the north of Aurora Highlands to house the main offices of the Department of Defense (DoD). After the war the many civilian and military jobs relocated there, along with the return of many veterans, drove new housing construction, and Aurora Highlands was one of the more popular sites for development, with many small brick Cape Cods going up on small lots resulting from multiple resubdivisions. Few of those houses had driveways, and residents parked in the streets.

By 1960 Arlington's population had increased sevenfold in the preceding 30 years. Three years later, the industrial and auto-related businesses in the area across U.S. Route 1 to the east of Aurora Highlands began being redeveloped into high-rise condominiums and office buildings, the beginnings of today's Crystal City. As soon as it was built, office space was often leased by defense contractors, taking advantage of the proximity of the Pentagon, and DoD itself to handle satellite and spillover functions. Late in the decade the federal government moved the U.S. Patent Office and the Institute for Defense Analysis to Crystal City.

== Underlying dispute ==
Crystal City in the late 20th century, with Aurora Highlands at left

At that time the many workers who came to Crystal City from elsewhere in the D.C. metropolitan area commuted by automobile. While Arlington's zoning code required developers to provide adequate off-street parking for the intended use of their buildings, most such parking in Crystal City charged fees for nonresidents. Commuters looking to save money thus went looking for free parking within walking distance, and found it in abundance on the nearby streets of Aurora Highlands.

This made the streets in the Highlands crowded and difficult to navigate during the day, as well as increasing noise and traffic around morning and evening rush hour. From 1968 onwards, residents complained to county government, which experimented with several sets of restrictions, neither of which were effective in addressing the parking problem and often inconvenienced the residents they were meant to benefit. Fearing that the eventual coming of Washington Metro service to Crystal City would exacerbate the problem, residents and county government persuaded the state legislature to pass a law in 1972 allowing the county to require permits for on-street parking in designated areas and charge higher fees to nonresidents. A six-block area was designated by county ordinance that October, with residents each issued one permit.

Enforcement was soon blocked by an injunction, after a group of commuters brought suit. In December county Circuit Court judge William Winston ruled against the county, finding the ordinance did not provide clear guidelines for its implementation and did not accomplish its stated goals of protecting the environment. The county and its planning department went back to work, initiating a study using free permits issued to residents to determine at what times more than 75 percent of the parking space in Aurora Highlands was occupied and when 25 percent of the cars in them were from outside the neighborhood.

The study showed that in a nine-block area of Aurora Highlands, encompassing 81 buildings, (Note: All but two of the single-family homes in that area had off-street parking available at that time.) including 101 residences, and 192 parking spaces, 188 were occupied during the day. Of those 188, 156 were occupied by vehicles whose drivers and passengers worked in Crystal City. Based on that data, the county passed a new residential zoned parking ordinance that went into effect in July 1974, declaring a long list of objectives, including protecting residents from unreasonable burdens on access to their homes, and preserving the residential character of the neighborhood, as well as alleviating the earlier environmental concerns. Under it, parking in the nine-block area was limited to residents and those visiting them between 8 a.m. and 5 p.m. on weekdays. Within a short period of its adoption, the streets were as clear during the day as they had been before Crystal City's construction.

The commuters who had brought suit before did so again, this time as a facial challenge to the ordinance on constitutional grounds. The distinction it drew between residents and nonresidents of the designated area, they said, was arbitrary and thus an infringement of their rights to equal protection of the laws under the U.S. Constitution's Fourteenth Amendment, as well as the provision of the state constitution forbidding the passage of "special" legislation. All the plaintiffs drove to work in Crystal City from outside the area, with the exception of Rudolph Richards, the lead plaintiff, who lived in Aurora Highlands one block outside the designated area and walked to work; he argued that the unconstitutionality of the ordinance arose from its practical effect of allowing his neighbors who might live in the permit zone to freely park in front of his house while he could not park in front of theirs. Unlike the previous suit the court did not enjoin the ordinance's enforcement.

Arguments were made before Winston, again hearing the case, in March 1975; he rendered a decision by letter in June and made it final with an order in September. He agreed with the plaintiffs that the ordinance was unconstitutional. The county appealed to the Virginia Supreme Court, citing its obligations under the federal Clean Air Act to develop and implement ways to reduce air pollution; guidance from the U.S. Environmental Protection Agency had suggested, among other things, implementing parking limitations to accomplish that goal.

== Virginia Supreme Court ==
The state Supreme Court heard arguments and decided the case in January 1977, affirming the trial court. Justice Richard Harding Poff wrote for a unanimous court that held the ordinance violated the Equal Protection Clause of the Fourteenth Amendment, without reaching the state constitutional argument.

Choosing from several theories of how the ordinance created and distinguished among classes, the court found it to be "residence in a selected area". It also agreed with the county that its objectives in passing the ordinance were "a legitimate governmental interest". The only question to decide was whether the distinction between residents and nonresidents of the nine-block area of Aurora Highlands was rationally related to accomplishing the ordinance's objectives.

The county relied on several precedents from Virginia and other states to support the constitutionality of selectively applicable parking regulations. The court did not find them relevant as none of the challenged classifications involved residence. It similarly rejected a Maine case upholding an overnight parking prohibition since it applied to all motorists. Poff conceded that the county was not required to choose "the least restrictive alternative" in this case since the right at issue was not a fundamental constitutional right. "[B]ut it is never free to adopt an alternative so restrictive that it violates rights secured by the equal protection clause."

The court saw the issue as one of protecting common public property. The state's statutory grant of zoning authority to local governments, "does not include the power to adopt ordinances which grant residents a parking monopoly in the public streets of their neighborhood." And while state law recognized the right of a property owner to make the same use of any public street or way abutting their property as any other member of the public, "ownership of such property gives the owner no right to the use of the street superior to that enjoyed by the public at large."

The analysis concluded with one reported case the court found highly relevant, as it involved the question of residents-only parking on public roads. In 1970 Ohio's Court of Common Pleas for Scioto County had heard State v. Whisman, an appeal from the New Boston Mayor's Court of a driver ticketed for parking on one of two streets where the village had, like Arlington County, instituted a permit system to limit parking to residents only. There, too, the court had seen the ordinance as impermissibly and arbitrarily granting the residents greater rights over the public streets in front of their houses, and used some of the same language as Poff. its decision cited precedents dating to 1889 holding it beyond a government's constitutional authority to give residents special permission to park vehicles, or forbid them from doing so, on streets near their homes.

While the court conceded the ordinance may have solved a legitimate problem, "solutions achieved at the price of invidious discrimination are too dear." Poff noted that a more recent state law, not before the court in the instant case, that allowed local governments to differentiate between the terms of parking permits offered to residents and nonresidents as long as it was open to all motorists.

== U.S. Supreme Court ==
The county was disappointed with the decision, but did not see any likelihood of appealing it to the U.S. Supreme Court. Board chairman Joseph Wholey told The Washington Post there did not seem to be any federal issues the country's highest court could consider. He said there were "other possibilities", like time limits, to deal with Arlington's parking problem, but while they would have to be implemented before the first Metro stations opened in the county later in the year new laws would not be among them. "Whatever we decide to do we will be treating everyone alike."

Those plans were changed in favor of appealing the case to the Supreme Court shortly afterwards. The EPA took an interest in the case, and the Solicitor General's office offered to argue it. The Virginia Supreme Court's decision seemed to conflict with the Supreme Court's holding three years earlier in Village of Belle Terre v. Boraas, which had upheld a zoning ordinance in a Long Island community that limited residents of houses an area zoned for single-family housing to those related by blood, adoption or marriage, in order to prevent homes from being converted into off-campus rental housing for students at a nearby state university. Vehicles, it was argued, could certainly not enjoy greater rights than people.

Three months later, the argument for the Supreme Court hearing the case grew (Note: At the end of May, the Court also reaffirmed Belle Terre in Moore v. City of East Cleveland, modifying it slightly to hold the challenged zoning ordinance, which defined a "single family" so narrowly that the petitioner faced criminal charges for letting her grandson live with her, unconstitutional.) when the Massachusetts Supreme Judicial Court handed down Commonwealth v. Petralia, in which the respondent had challenged an ordinance in the city of Cambridge that limited parking in a residential area of the East Cambridge neighborhood to residents with permits every day of the week except Sunday. It, too, was challenged on equal protection grounds. The Massachusetts court considered Whisman and the same precedents it had, but found them "inapplicable to the case before us, which involves a congested urban area which has had substantial traffic and parking problems for years."

It took note of Richards but noted that the Arlington County Board had not, in passing the ordinance, justified it with environmental concerns as broadly as Cambridge had and that the Virginia Supreme Court "accordingly gives no consideration to the possibility that a parking regulation, seemingly favoring residents of an area, might be justified on broader considerations than those expressed by the local board." It found the distinction between residents and nonresidents to be rationally related and thus constitutional:

A resident who parks near his home is not using his automobile, whereas a person who parks in an area away from his home has used his vehicle and thus has contributed to the problems which the Cambridge regulation seeks to address. The rational distinction made by the Cambridge regulation is founded on vehicle use. Place of residence is merely a reasonable means of measuring that use.

Similar cases challenging the constitutionality of residents-only on-street permit parking were also beginning to work their way through courts in Maryland and the District of Columbia, where the first courts to hear them had taken the same position as Virginia.

Instead of granting certiorari, the Supreme Court decided the case based on the briefs. In October the Court returned a short unanimous per curiam opinion vacating the Virginia Supreme Court decision. After recapitulating the facts and history of the case, it devoted two paragraphs to explaining its decision.

Accepting the legitimacy of the ordinance's goal of reducing air pollution and preserving the quality of life in residential neighborhoods, the Court found it reasonable to accomplish that both by limiting the availability of parking to commuters in order to encourage carpooling and the use of mass transit and restricting nonresident parking in residential neighborhoods. "By definition, discrimination against nonresidents would inhere in such restrictions."

That distinction was not inherently unconstitutional, the Court held. "The Equal Protection Clause requires only that the distinction drawn by an ordinance like Arlington's rationally promote the regulation's objectives", it wrote, citing Belle Terre and City of New Orleans v. Dukes, another per curiam case from the year before in which it had upheld an ordinance limiting pushcart food vendors in a public square to those who had been operating those businesses for 20 years or more, overturning a 1957 ruling where it had held such legislation, benefiting a particular business or businesses, violative of the Fourteenth Amendment.

There were no concurrences or dissents by individual justices. A note at the end indicated that Justice Thurgood Marshall would have granted the certiorari petition and scheduled the case for oral argument. At the end of November the Court denied a petition for rehearing.

== Aftermath ==
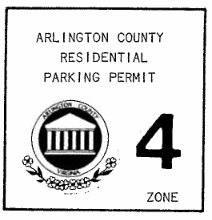
Arlington County residential parking permit issued from 1978 to 1985

"The decision appears to be a major step towards more rational transportation planning in urban areas" the William and Mary Law and Environmental Policy Review commented afterwards. "Cities are now free to go forward with efforts to deal intelligently with the role of the automobile and with the environmental problems it brings." Litigation against most other residential parking permit programs was dropped, and cities all over the country moved forward with adopting and implementing them.

== Subsequent jurisprudence ==
=== Supreme Court ===
The opinion had observed that "restrictions on the flow of outside traffic into particular residential areas would enhance the quality of life there by reducing noise, traffic hazards, and litter." Four years later the Court decided a case that turned on exactly that issue, when the vacation and closure of part of a Memphis, Tennessee, street, argued to be for those reasons, came before it.

Memphis's city council had, in the mid-70s, granted the request of residents of the predominantly residential white Midtown neighborhood of Hein Park, (Note: Like Aurora Highlands, Hein Park has also subsequently been listed on the National Register as a historic district.) to close off West Drive at its northern terminus, a four-way intersection with Jackson Avenue (Tennessee State Route 14), in order to improve neighborhood's quality of life. After it was granted, opponents sued, arguing the true motive was racial exclusion, to reduce through traffic in Hein Park from the predominantly Black neighborhoods to the north of Jackson. The Western District of Tennessee dismissed the claim, but after being reversed by the Sixth Circuit,

On remand, the district court held for the city. A divided Sixth Circuit reversed, conceding among other points the language from Richards about street closings, but noting the trial judge's reservations about evidence of racial animus and disparate racial impact. Judges Damon Keith and John Weld Peck II found these strong enough to reverse, but Anthony J. Celebrezze dissented, agreeing that while the closure had disparately impacted the residents of neighborhoods to the north, the plaintiffs had not shown that the decision was racially motivated.

The Supreme Court reversed, with Justice John Paul Stevens writing for himself and four other justices who largely agreed with Celebrezze and basing part of their holding, that protecting the tranquility of residential neighborhoods is a legitimate interest, on Belle Terre and Richards. Since many urban neighborhoods often have an ethnic character, they further implied, government actions that benefit one neighborhood at the expense of another may inevitably have racially disparate effects regardless of intent. Justice Byron White, concurring, felt the majority had far exceeded the scope of the case's original question, as the Sixth Circuit had in reversing the trial court, and would have remanded for it to better determine the scope of the laws involved. Marshall, joined by justices William Brennan and Harry Blackmun, argued the Sixth Circuit's majority had found sufficient circumstantial evidence of racial animus behind the decision to leave their decision undisturbed.

In 1985's Metropolitan Life Insurance Co. v. Ward, the Court held 5–4 that an Alabama statute taxing out-of-state insurance companies at higher rates in order to encourage the growth and creation of in-state insurers was an unconstitutional denial of the petitioners' rights under the Equal Protection Clause. Justice Sandra Day O'Connor, writing for the dissenters, cited Richards for its general proposition that discrimination against nonresidents of an area or jurisdiction is not per se unconstitutional.

=== Other federal courts ===
Following removal from state court, in 2015 the District of New Jersey heard Martell's Tiki Bar v. Borough of Point Pleasant Beach, a very similar case in which a bar in the defendant Shore town challenged a similar residents-only on-street permit parking plan passed to combat the issues created by the bars and tourist businesses on busy summer nights. The borough had eliminated parking fees and meters at one of its municipal lots to encourage parking there instead of on streets adjacent to the bars and other businesses that drew visitors to Point Pleasant Beach during the season. Only residents of those areas were permitted to park there in the early hours of the morning. In an unpublished opinion, Judge Joel A. Pisano found the case identical to Richards, quoting from it at length, and rejecting the plaintiff's contention that the ordinance did not fulfill the borough's objectives as speculative.

Five years later, early in the COVID-19 pandemic, the Western District of Pennsylvania relied on Richards to uphold that portion of the state's pandemic restrictions which differentiated between regions of the state, while striking down all the other elements of the plan. "It is well established that states and local governments may impose requirements or restrictions that apply in one region and not in others", Judge William Stickman wrote. "Doing so recognized and respected the differences in population density, infrastructure and other factors relevant to the effort to address the virus." He dismissed complaints that the distinctions between those areas in the state's plan were too subtle as "rational basis does not require the granularity of a neighborhood by neighborhood plan". (Note: On appeal, the Third Circuit dismissed the case as moot, since by then the Pennsylvania Legislature had stripped the state's governor of his power to issue the emergency orders challenged.)

=== State courts ===
Two years after Richards, the city of Lafayette, California, relied on it to support its plan to gate a through road going into the community at the boundary with surrounding Contra Costa County so that only residents and those with a demonstrated need to use the road could do so. The trial court's holding for the county was affirmed on appeal. Judge Norman Elkington wrote for a unanimous panel that while Richards had held that local restrictions on traffic flow based on residency, at least by prohibiting non-resident parking during business hours through a permit system, were not unconstitutional, that did not reach closing the streets to non-resident or non-essential through traffic. California law reserved authority over public roads to the legislature, except where explicitly delegated, and the state had not granted any local or county government that power.

California's courts approved a permit system similar to Arlington's in 1984. The defendant in People v. Housman, convicted of parking her car in a permit-required residential area of Beverly Hills, argued that since the Constitution guaranteed her right to travel as a fundamental right, she necessarily had the freedom to park her car where she wanted and thus the restrictions should be subject to strict scrutiny rather than the rational-basis test. In rejecting her argument on appeal, Judge James Reese, calling Richards "the sole authority which we have ascertained to be directly in point to the legal and factual issues before us", found none of her cited precedents involved parking, and that none of them established that the freedom to travel guaranteed the freedom to choose the means of travel.

In 1988, New York courts handed down a similar pair of decisions, with a higher court ruling against residential parking preference on the grounds that municipalities lacked authority to implement them, while a lower court upheld one in practice when a defendant challenged his conviction. In the former case, the Court of Appeals, the state's highest court, upheld an appeals court decision striking down Albany's ordinance limiting nonresidents to 90 minutes of parking in residential areas near the city center during weekdays, a measure aimed at curbing parking problems created by a daily influx of white-collar state employees, whose union, the Public Employees Federation, brought the suit. The city had relied partially on Richards, but like the California court that had ruled against Lafayette the Court of Appeals held that the constitutionality of the ordinance was moot where the legislature had not granted local governments the authority to enact those laws. (Note: In 2000 the state's appellate court struck down a revised plan in which Albany would have made street parking permits available to nonresidents at an annual rate over 50 times that charged residents, on the same grounds of insufficient authority. See also Younker v. Village of Ossining, 41 A.D.3d 470 (N.Y.A.D.2d 2007). (ordinance prohibiting overnight parking constitutional since it does not distinguish between residents and nonresidents).)

Later in 1988, a defendant charged with parking in a residents-only zone in the Long Island village of Bellerose was convicted. The village justice hearing the case relied largely on Richards, finding the facts substantially similar, and distinguished the case from the Albany ordinance by noting that the Court of Appeals had there invalidated the ordinance in part because the city had offered no rationale for it beyond Richards and some broad statutory provisions. Bellerose, by contrast, had based its ordinance on largely the same grounds as Arlington County. In a case involving a different defendant several years later, the Court of Appeals affirmed its earlier ruling and struck down Bellerose's ordinance on the same grounds as Albany's, the municipality's lack of legal authority to impose it.

The issue divided the Pennsylvania Supreme Court in 1991. Chief Justice Ralph Cappy wrote for a majority of five that upheld a Stroudsburg ordinance imposing a time limit on nonresident parking in certain residential neighborhoods. "Neither the stated purpose of the ordinance, nor its application, reveals a tyrannical abuse of authority with no logical intention", he wrote, noting its similarity to the one at issue in Richards. Justice Rolf Larsen, joined by John P. Flaherty Jr., dissented.

Like his Virginia colleague Poff, Larsen considered the public property interest in the streets foreclosed any preferential treatment for the residents along them. He found the distinction arbitrary in light of the ordinance's stated goals of reducing hazardous traffic conditions:

The Borough of Stroudsburg is declaring, in effect, that the motor vehicles of nonresidents create hazardous traffic conditions in residential parking districts, if they are allowed to park all day in those districts during business hours, but that the motor vehicles of residents with permits do not create hazardous traffic conditions under the same circumstances. This is a distinction that is both artificial and clearly without merit.

In addition, Larsen wrote, Pennsylvania's case law required that the police power operate equally on all, which the Stroudsburg ordinance—"penaliz[ing] some for conduct that others may engage in with impunity"—did not.

In 1993, the Montana Supreme Court upheld a similar Missoula ordinance against a challenge by students at the University of Montana. The plaintiffs had relied heavily on similar case law establishing public ownership and use of the streets, but "[t]his exhaustive history is irrelevant where our legislature has granted municipalities the statutory authority to create parking restrictions, and where our constitution grants this authority to municipalities" wrote Chief Justice Jean A. Turnage for a unanimous court of six justices. (Note: Justice Karla M. Gray took no part in the case.) He cited Richards to dispense with the plaintiffs' equal protection argument, noting that there were other instances where the U.S. Supreme Court had found its state counterparts to have applied tests too stringently in striking down laws under that provision, (Note: Idaho Department of Employment v. Smith, 434 U.S. 100 (1977). (law denying unemployment to students taking classes during the day constitutional as it is less likely such students will be available to work); Richardson v. Ramirez, 418 U.S. 24 (1974). (disenfranchisement of convicted felons is constitutional as the Fourteenth Amendment allows for it) and Lehnhausen v. Lake Shore Auto Parts Co., 410 U.S. 356 (1973). (abolition of individual personal property tax while retaining it on corporations is constitutional)) as Virginia's had in that case.

== Analysis and commentary ==
=== Constitutional and legal basis ===
As the Court had offered very little in support of its holding, in 1978 Michelle Miller of the Boston College Environmental Affairs Law Review undertook a more in-depth analysis of her own into the Arlington County ordinance's constitutionality and rational basis along with the Massachusetts Supreme Court's Petralia decision. (Note: While Whisman had been the first case to consider the issue, Miller chose not to consider it as New Boston was a small community that did not experience the issues Arlington County and Cambridge had cited to justify their ordinances.)

In neither case had the plaintiffs chosen to challenge the ordinance under the Court's much more exacting strict scrutiny standard for equal protection, under which a compelling state interest that can be addressed only by the challenged law. It is reserved only for discrimination against a suspect class or where a fundamental constitutional right is alleged to have been impinged. Miller noted that while some residential parking cases had invoked the right to travel, as recognized during the 1960s by United States v. Guest and Shapiro v. Thompson, (as Housman later would), neither Richards nor Petralia had.

The Court had, Miller observed, declined in Guest on trying to identify what particular constitutional provisions the right to travel could be derived from, although some lower courts had tried. It had changed its focus on deciding what activities were so fundamental as to be protected by the Constitution from impairment through durational residency requirements as a precondition. In most recent federal cases where it been held that the challenged ordinance impermissibly infringed the right to travel, Miller noted, it had involved, like Shapiro, such a residency requirement and/or interstate travel, (Note: Miller cites Dunn v. Blumstein, 405 U.S. 330 (1972). (conditioning franchise on durational residency in state unconstitutional); Memorial Hospital v. Maricopa County, 415 U.S. 250 (1974). (one-year residency requirement for free treatment of indigent patient unconstitutional); Krzewinski v. Kugler, 338 F.Supp. 492 (D.N.J. 1972). (state law requiring police officers and firefighters to reside in the communities they serve unconstitutional); King v. New Rochelle Municipal Housing Authority, 442 F.2d 646 (2nd Cir. 1971). and Cole v. Housing Authority of the City of Newport, 435 F.2d 807 (1st Cir. 1970). (durational residency requirements for public housing eligibility unconstitutional); Donnelly v. City of Manchester, 111 N.H. 50 (N.H. 1971). (requirement that teachers move into city within a year of employment if not already residents unconstitutional)) neither of which were at issue in the parking cases, making the latter "easily distinguishable." The other cases also involved migration, with the aggrieved parties having chosen to resettle in the jurisdictions they sued, as opposed to regularly traveling there from their residences elsewhere for work.

In another per curiam (Note: In that case also, three justices indicated they would have scheduled the case for oral argument.) decision upholding Philadelphia's residency requirement for its employees, the Supreme Court had distinguished that case from Shapiro in that the instant case had involved a regulation that required the job applicant merely be a resident at the time of his or her employment without imposing a minimum durational requirement prior to applying. According to Miller, that case along with Richards had clearly established that residency could not be considered a suspect classification, automatically subject to strict scrutiny.

Miller then turned to the rational basis for the ordinance. She identified two: air pollution control and preservation of neighborhood character, identified in the preamble to the Arlington ordinance (The Cambridge ordinance at issue had not mentioned pollution, but the city's briefs had). Train v. Natural Resources Defense Council, in interpreting amendments to the Clean Air Act, had placed air pollution control within the limits of governmental police power, and Belle Terre had similarly established a state interest in keeping residential neighborhoods quiet, livable places.

That left the question of how the ordinance was rationally related to those objectives. Miller pointed to City of Pittsburgh v. Alco Parking Co. as a precedent establishing that governments could distinguish between residential and non-residential parking, imposing greater burdens on the latter. There, the respondents had challenged a tax the city imposed on privately operated parking facilities as imposing an unconstitutional burden on their businesses meant to favor lots the city itself operated. The Court had reversed the Pennsylvania Supreme Court's holding in their favor on the grounds that the power to tax, even prohibitively, was within the state's constitutional prerogative.

The Supreme Court noted that the lower court had accepted as legitimate the city's concerns about the negative effects the abundant supply of private parking had on city life. "By enacting the tax, the city insisted that those providing and utilizing nonresidential parking facilities should pay more taxes to compensate the city for the problems incident to offstreet parking", Justice Byron White wrote for a unanimous Court. "The city was constitutionally entitled to put the automobile parker to the choice of using other transportation or paying the increased tax."

As for the parking ordinance's relation to air pollution control, Miller looked to the First Circuit Court of Appeals's 1974 decision in South Terminal Corp. v. EPA, which had upheld a challenge to the Metropolitan Boston Transportation Air Quality Control Plan required under the Clean Air Act. The plan had called for several methods of reducing vehicle usage, including restrictions on the creation of new off-street parking spaces and who might use them, with preference given to residents of the areas affected at the expense of commuters to those areas; the Cambridge ordinance that had survived review in Petralia was later incorporated into that overall plan.

Originally, the EPA had proposed a plan whereby drivers would only be allowed to drive into the core of the Boston metropolitan area, which had the worst transportation-related air quality problems, only on four of every five working days. Reaction to that part of the plan was strongly negative, and the EPA compromised to the parking restrictions. The First Circuit found that while the original plan would have had a greater effect on hydrocarbon pollution, the parking restrictions "seems plainly less disruptive and more acceptable", since there was greater flexibility in how to comply with it. Nor was the restriction arbitrary and capricious in its application to commuters, since trips to and from work accounted at that time for 40 percent of all the vehicle-miles traveled annually in the Boston area.

While conceding that the backing of federal legislation by itself gave neither ordinance the guarantee of constitutionality, Miller was content that both courts had adequately established from the Clean Air Act the ordinances' rational basis. The remaining question was why the Virginia Supreme Court had held contrarily in the Arlington County case. She believed it might have been because the ordinance there limited permits only to residents of the area where they were required, giving Richards, who lived just outside of that area, the ability to argue that the law made an arbitrary distinction by denying him the right to park in front of houses in the zone during the applicable hours while their residents could freely park in front of his house at any time. The first version of the Cambridge ordinance had been struck down as unconstitutional by a state appellate court, she recalled, since it only allowed residents of the area where permits were required to obtain those permits; once it was amended to allow all Cambridge residents to get permits, the version challenged by Petralia, it was upheld.

As to the Virginia court's holding that the ordinance gave the Aurora Highlands residents an impermissible monopoly over the streets in their neighborhood, Miller pointed to Dukes and the hot dog pushcart vendor oligopoly the Court had found permissible as a way of maintaining the neighborhood character. She rejected the argument that as a purely economic regulation, Dukes necessarily reflected a lower standard of review than Richards, which reached social behavior. The ordinance at issue in Belle Terre, she noted, had directly targeted the latter, and explicitly mentioned it as requiring only a rational basis if it did not impair a fundamental constitutional right. And if even the First Amendment rights had to yield to protecting neighborhood character, as had been the case with the Detroit zoning ordinance upheld in Young v. American Mini Theatres, Inc., which required adult movie theaters to be at least a thousand feet (300 m) from each other, certainly parking would also be subordinate to that interest, Miller argued. The Virginia Supreme Court, in finding that the ordinance achieved its goals at "too dear" a constitutional price, had applied an impermissible balancing test, substituted its judgement for the county board's and exceeded the scope of proper review, she wrote.

=== Facilitation of racial segregation in neighborhoods ===
In 2020 Michael Connor, an associate at planning firm Kimley-Horn, posed the question in Parking Today of whether some residential parking zones had abetted racial segregation. Some created in the years since Richards had included more complex requirements, such as a minimum amount of spaces occupied during the daytime. Others had shown a preference for single-family housing over multiple-unit dwellings, to the point of sometimes not allowing any of the latter to be part of a residential permit zone, which tended to disproportionately impact poorer and minority residents. Combined with restrictive zoning and limited off-street parking available to residents of multiple-unit dwellings, residential parking preference can be used to send a message to members of those communities that they are unwelcome in neighborhoods with those provisions.

"This was not what was intended in the U.S. Supreme Court's Arlington County v. Richards decision", Connor wrote. He conceded that such zones are "a necessary evil" for residents in areas such as Aurora Highlands that create high parking demand for adjacent land uses. But "many RPPPs are being utilized on a neighbor vs. neighbor and on a street-by-street basis to preserve valuable curbside parking for single-family residents who mistakenly believe that the portion of roadway in front of their house is part of their property." He noted that Arlington County itself was then under a self-imposed moratorium on the creation of new residential parking zones, and reminded his fellow planners that "it is our responsibility to identify inequities in our parking programs and eliminate them" by keeping in mind the social impacts of parking regulations they might design.

== See also ==
- List of United States Supreme Court cases by the Burger Court
