= Saegmuller House =

Historic house in Arlington, Virginia, US

- U.S. National Register of Historic Places
- Virginia Landmarks Register
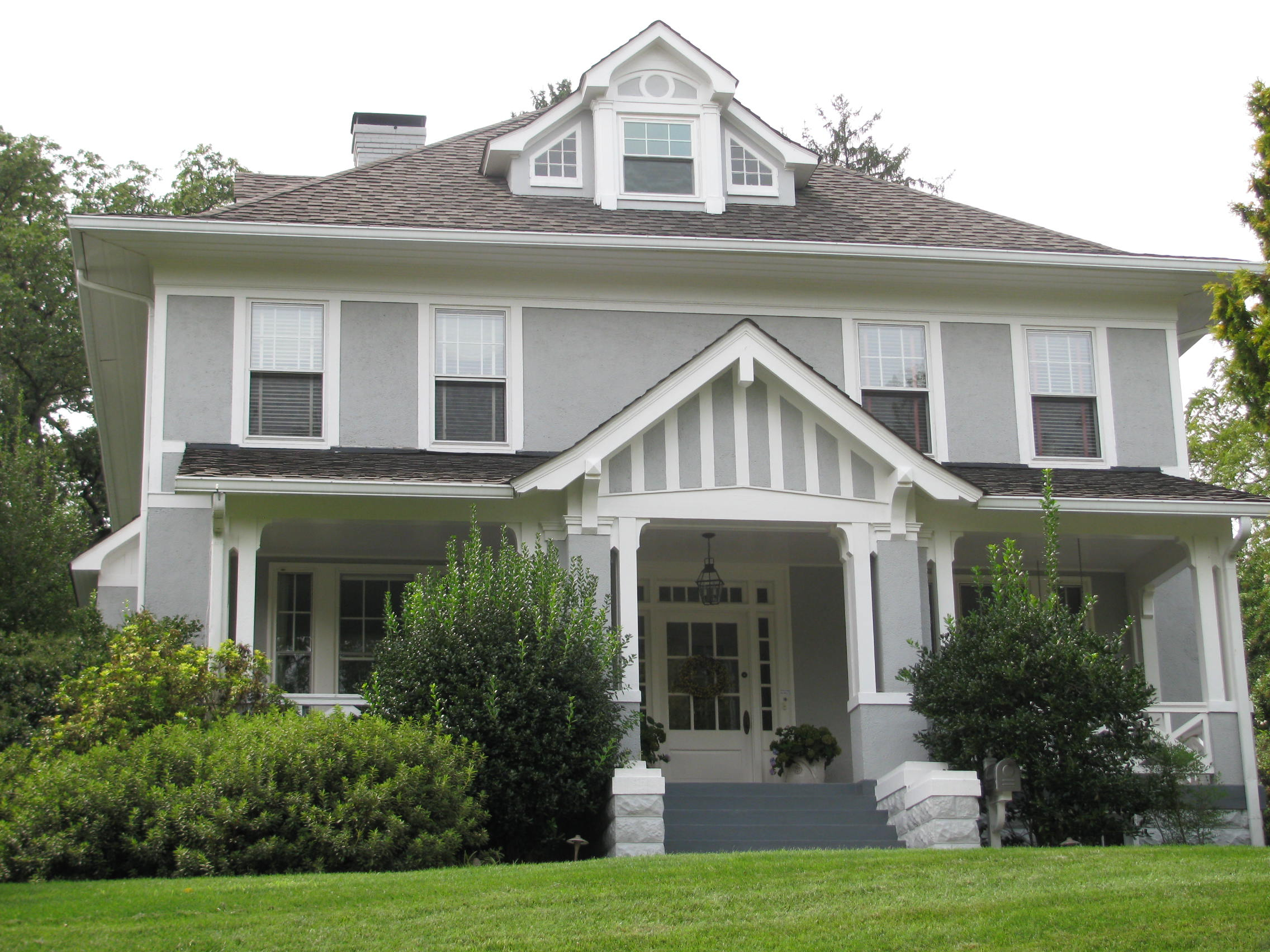
- Saegmuller House, September 2012

- Location within District of Columbia Location within Virginia Location within the United States
- Location: 5101 Little Falls Rd., Arlington, Virginia
- Coordinates: 38°54′21″N 77°8′25″W
- Area: less than one acre
- Built: 1925-1927
- Architectural style: Late 19th And Early 20th Century American Movements
- NRHP reference No.: 03000453
- VLR No.: 000-0020

Significant dates
- Added to NRHP: May 22, 2003
- Designated VLR: May 19, 2003

The Saegmuller House is a historic home located in Arlington, Virginia. It was built between 1925 and 1927, and is 2 1/2-story, stuccoed frame central-hall plan dwelling with Prairie School influences. It sits on a concrete block foundation and has a pyramidal roof. It features an original front porch with large piers and columns and a prominent central gable and deep overhanging eaves. The house was once associated with the Saegmuller dairy farms operations.

It was listed on the National Register of Historic Places in 2004.
