= Residential zoned parking =

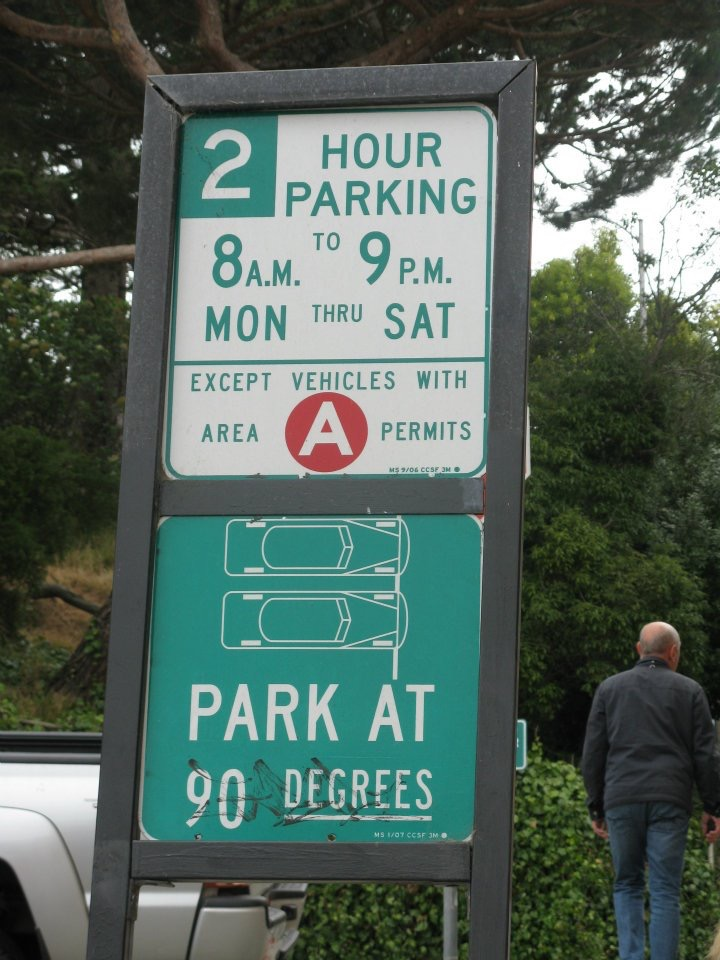
This parking sign in San Francisco stipulates that motorists may only park for up to two hours from 8 a.m. to 9 p.m. Monday through Saturday unless the applicable residential parking permit is displayed

Residential zoned parking is a local government practice of designating certain on-street automobile parking spaces for the exclusive use of nearby residents. It is a tool for addressing overspill parking from neighboring population centers (such as a shopping center, office building, apartment building, transit station, stadium, or central business district). Typically, residents in the zone pay a small fee to the government in exchange for a placard or sticker placed on their automobile(s) that indicates the zone designation (signified by a number or letter).

In the United States, residential zoned parking was challenged in 1977 as violating the constitutional right of equal protection of the laws, because it favored one group of people (nearby residents) over another group of people (commuters). The case was decided by the Supreme Court, which held in Arlington County Board v. Richards that the practice did not violate the Equal Protection Clause of the Fourteenth Amendment. Since then, it has been put into common practice throughout the United States, and has even been used in non-residential areas when a local street's parking is reserved for a business, museum or other facility.
