= 2014 in rail transport =

This article lists events related to rail transport that occurred in 2014.

== Events ==
=== January ===
- January 1
  - – Elron takes over all domestic passenger train services in Estonia from Edelaraudtee.
  - (United States) – Carl Ice assumes position as CEO of BNSF Railway, replacing the former CEO Matt Rose, who assumed position as Chief Operating Officer.
- (United States) January 2 – Canadian Pacific Railway announces the sale of 660 miles (1,060 km) of their Dakota, Minnesota and Eastern subsidiary to Genesee & Wyoming, who will operate it as the Rapid City, Pierre and Eastern Railroad. The sale, expected to close in mid-2014, includes the mainline from Tracy, Minnesota to Rapid City, South Dakota plus some branch lines.

=== March ===
- (United Arab Emirates) March 1 – In Dubai, the Green Line is extended from Dubai Healthcare City to Creek.
- (United States) March 23 – A Chicago 'L' train overruns the bumper at O'Hare, injuring 34. See: O'Hare station train crash
- (Australia) March 27 – Opening of the Dulwich Hill extension of Sydney's Inner West Light Rail.

=== April ===
- (Japan) April 1 – Formal closure of the Iwaizumi Line in Iwate Prefecture, which had been non-operational since 2010 after a landslide caused a derailment.
- April 5 – Opening of the Panama Metro in Panama City, Panama.
- (Japan) April 21 – An L0 Series maglev train sets the worldwide passenger railway speed record by reaching 603 km/h (375 mph) along the Yamanashi Test Track.
- (New Zealand) April 28 – Auckland's first electric trains, the AM class, entered service on the Onehunga Branch. (See Auckland railway electrification.)
- (China) April 29 – Changsha Metro Line 2 opens.

=== May ===
- May 1
  - (United States) – SunRail's commuter service in Greater Orlando, Florida, started service.
  - (Malaysia) – Opening of KLIA Ekspres KLIA2 extension line in Sepang.
- (United States) May 7 – Reopening of Saint Paul Union Depot in Minnesota to regularly scheduled train traffic. The depot last saw trains on 30 April 1971, the day before Amtrak began operation.
- May 9 – United States Department of Labor commemorates the contributions of Chinese railroad workers who helped build the railroad by adding them to the Labor Hall of Honor
- (Japan) May 11 – The section of the Esashi Line between Kikonai and Esashi in Hokkaido Prefecture closes permanently due to ailing patronage.
- (China) May 28 – The Wuhan Metro Line 1 Hankou North extension opens.

=== June ===
- June 8 – Line 1 of the Mumbai Metro in India opens on the Versova–Ghatkopar west–east corridor.
- (United States) June 14 – Opening of the Green Line light rail service in Minneapolis–Saint Paul, Minnesota.

=== July ===
- (United States) July 26 – The new Washington Metro Silver Line opens for passenger service in the Washington D.C. area. Construction of the Metro's 6th new rapid transit route included 11.8 miles of new trackway and 5 stations at McLean, Tysons Corner (now Tysons), Greensboro, Spring Hill and Wiehle–Reston East. Silver Line trains operate between Reston, Virginia and Largo Town Center (now Downtown Largo) station on the Blue Line.

=== August ===
- (Philippines) August 13 – A train of the Manila MRT Line 3 gets derailed at Taft Avenue station and overshot to the streets. The incident was caused by human error.
- (China) August 16 – Lhasa–Xigazê Railway opens to Xigazê Railway Station (Shigatse) in the Tibet Autonomous Region.

=== September ===
- (China) September 17 – Zhuyehai Station on Wuhan Metro's Line 1 opened.
- (Australia) September 21 – Transperth's Joondalup line is extended from Clarkson to Butler.
- (China) September 23 – Harbin Metro Line 1 opened one infill station serving Museum of Heilongjiang Province.

=== November ===
- (United States) November 10 – The Fulton Center New York City Subway interchange opened.
- (United States) November 22 – The Bay Area Rapid Transit Oakland Airport Connector automated people mover begins service.
- (Singapore) November 23 – North South MRT line 1 km extension opened, of which it is Marina South Pier MRT station.

=== December ===
- (India) December 25 – Indian Railways inaugurates the Sushasan Express, connecting Gwalior and Gonda, Uttar Pradesh, in commemoration of former Prime Minister Atal Bihari Vajpayee's 91st birthday.
- (Hong Kong) December 28 – West Island line opened.
