= 2014 in rail transport in the United States =

The following are events related to rail transportation in the United States that happened in 2014.

== January ==
- (United States) January 2 – Canadian Pacific Railway announces the sale of 660 miles (1,060 km) of their Dakota, Minnesota and Eastern subsidiary to Genesee & Wyoming, who will operate it as the Rapid City, Pierre and Eastern Railroad. The sale, expected to close in mid-2014, includes the mainline from Tracy, Minnesota to Rapid City, South Dakota plus some branch lines.

== May ==
- May 1– SunRail's commuter service in Greater Orlando, Florida, started service.
- May 7 – Reopening of Saint Paul Union Depot in Minnesota to regularly scheduled train traffic. The depot last saw trains on 30 April 1971, the day before Amtrak began operation.

== June ==
- (Massachusetts) June 14 – Opening of the Green Line light rail service in Minneapolis–Saint Paul, Minnesota.

== July ==
- (Washington, D.C.) (Maryland) July 26 – The new Washington Metro Silver Line opens for passenger service in the Washington D.C. area. Construction of the Metro's 6th new rapid transit route included 11.8 miles of new trackway and 5 stations at McLean, Tysons Corner (now Tysons), Greensboro, Spring Hill and Wiehle–Reston East. Silver Line trains operate between Reston, Virginia and Largo Town Center (now Downtown Largo) station on the Blue Line.

== August ==
- (Texas) August 18 - The DART Orange Line is extended from Belt Line station to Dallas Fort-Worth International Airport, providing rail service to one of the buisiest airports in the United States.

== November ==
- (New York (state)) November 10 – The Fulton Center New York City Subway interchange opened.
- (California) November 22 – The Bay Area Rapid Transit Oakland Airport Connector automated people mover begins service.
