= Wolf Trap station =

Proposed Washington Metro station

Wolf Trap
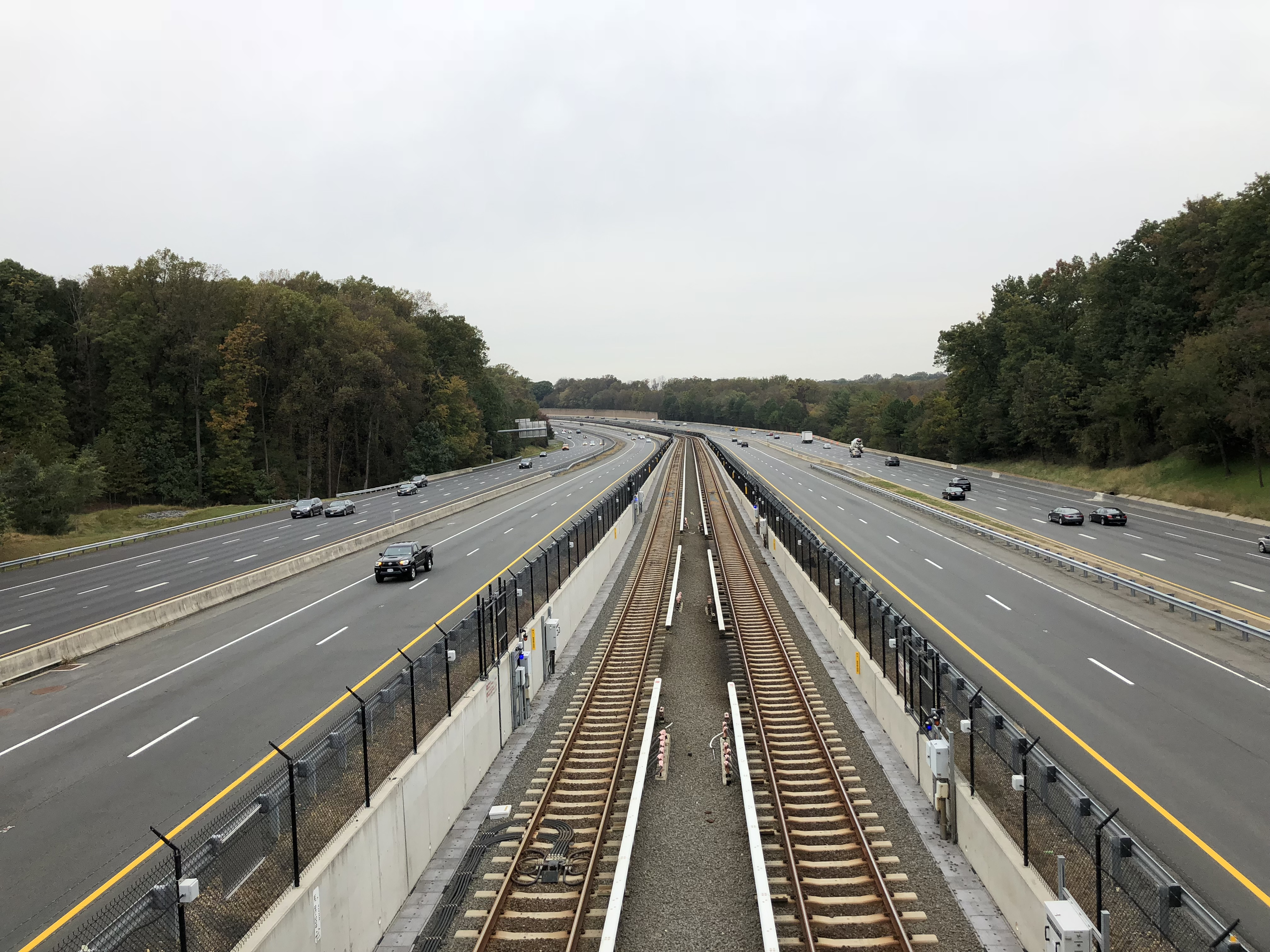
- The proposed station site seen in 2018

General information
- Location: 1594 Trap Road; Wolf Trap, Virginia
- Coordinates: 38.93660°N 77.26760°W
- Owner: WMATA
- Platforms: 1 island platform
- Tracks: 2

Construction
- Structure type: Surface level

Other information
- Station code: N05

Proposed services
Preceding station	Washington Metro	Following station
Wiehle–Reston East toward Ashburn	Silver Line	Spring Hill toward Downtown Largo or New Carrollton
Location

Wolf Trap station is a proposed Washington Metro station in Fairfax County, Virginia, on the Silver Line between Wiehle–Reston East and Spring Hill. The station would be located in the central median of Virginia State Route 267 (Dulles Access Road) at the Trap Road overpass adjacent to the Wolf Trap National Park for the Performing Arts.

A stop at Wolf Trap was considered for inclusion in the Silver Line, but it was deemed too costly with little development potential at the site. It was thus excluded from the initial phases of the project, though provisions were to be made for future construction of the station. Some of these provisions, such as the installation of an additional crossover, were omitted from the project in 2008 to reduce costs. In 2023, the Washington Metropolitan Area Transit Authority (WMATA) indicated no plans to construct the station.
