= Greensboro station =

Greensboro station may refer to:

- Greensboro station (Washington Metro), a Washington Metro station in Virginia
- J. Douglas Galyon Depot, or Greensboro station, an Amtrak station in North Carolina

== See also ==
- Greensborough railway station, Melbourne, Australia
