= Reston Station =

Urban mixed-use center in Virginia

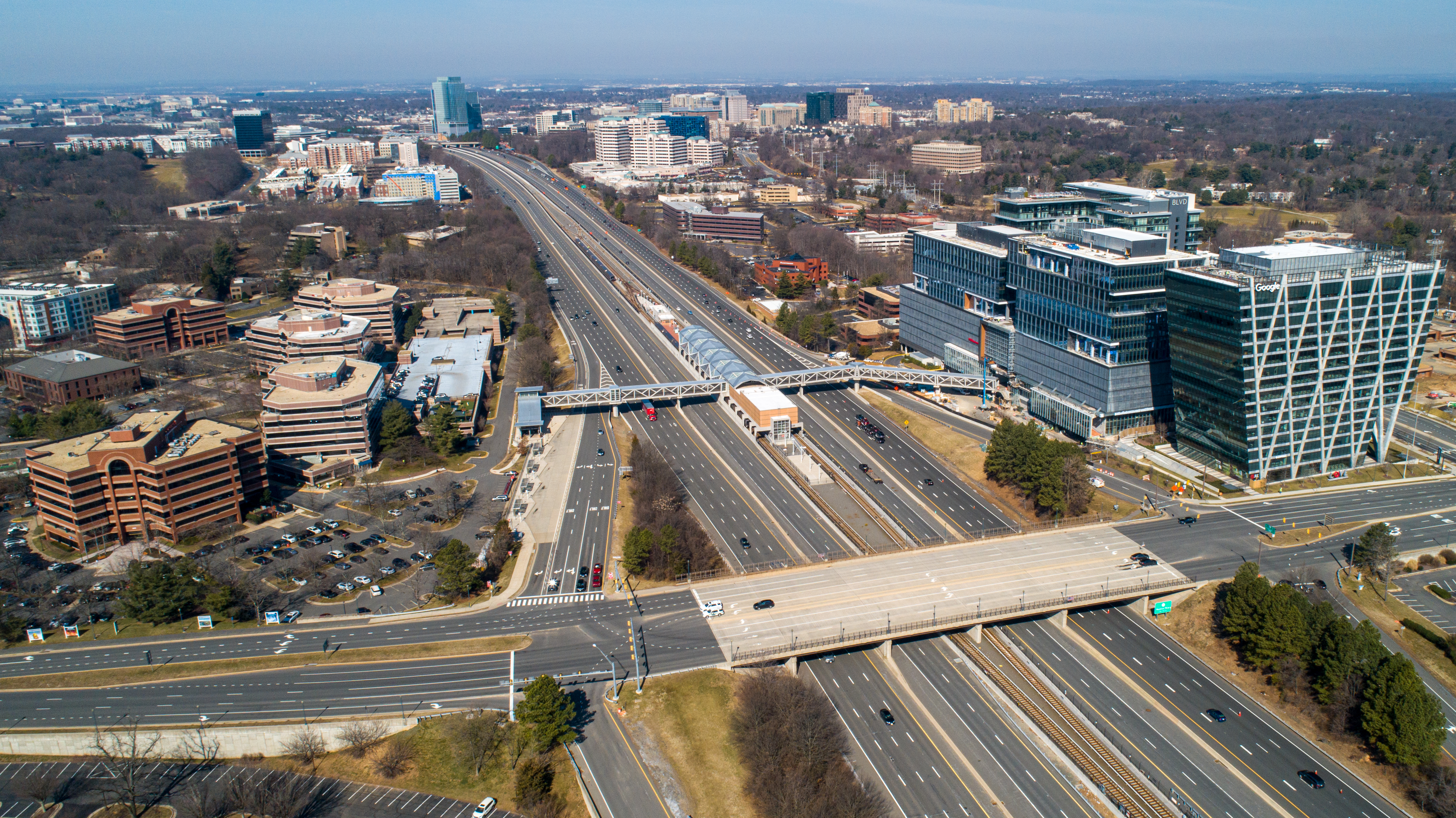
Reston Station consists of the Reston Metro Plaza and three other districts situated around the Wiehle–Reston East station.

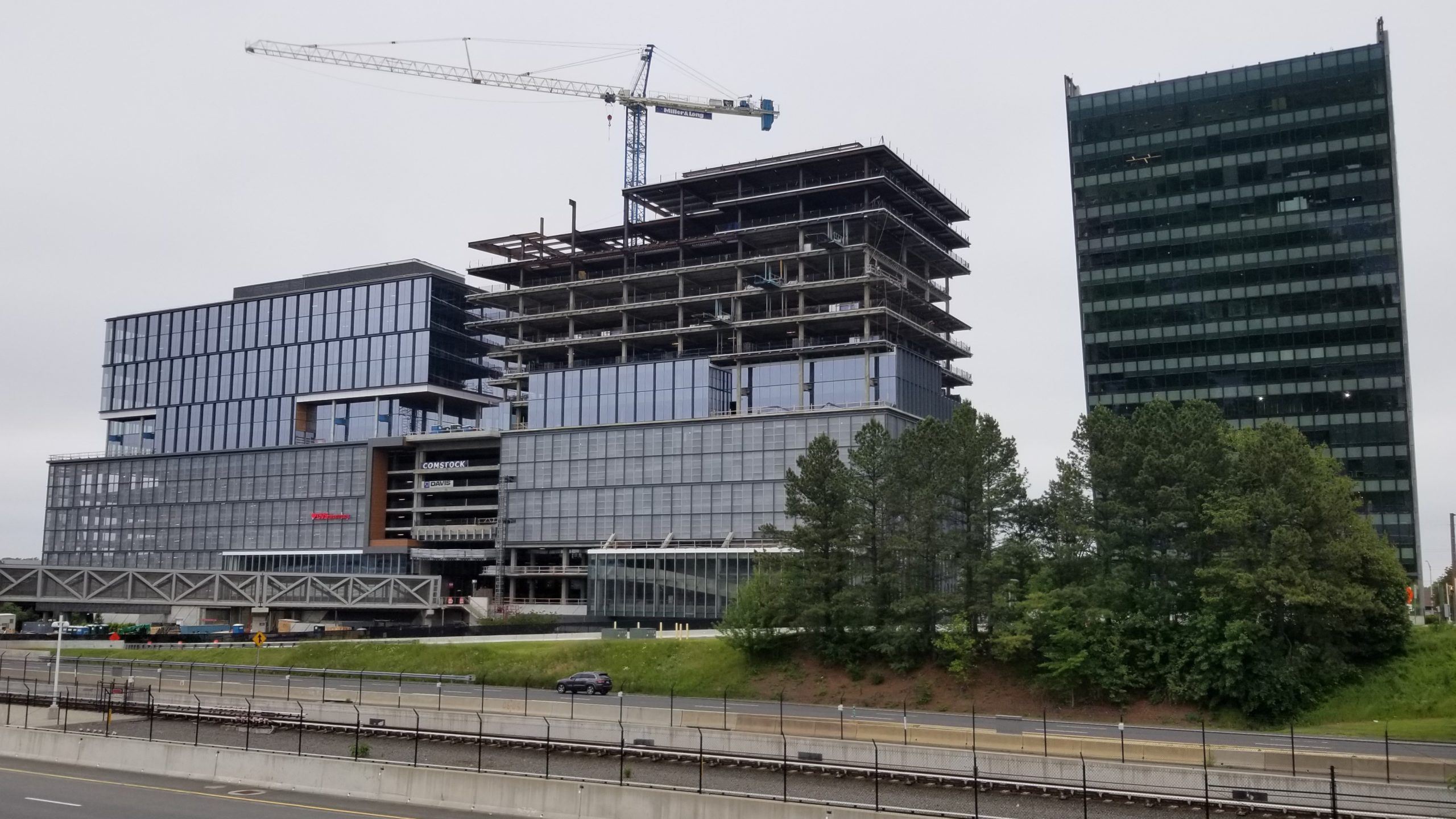
Reston Station under construction in May 2020

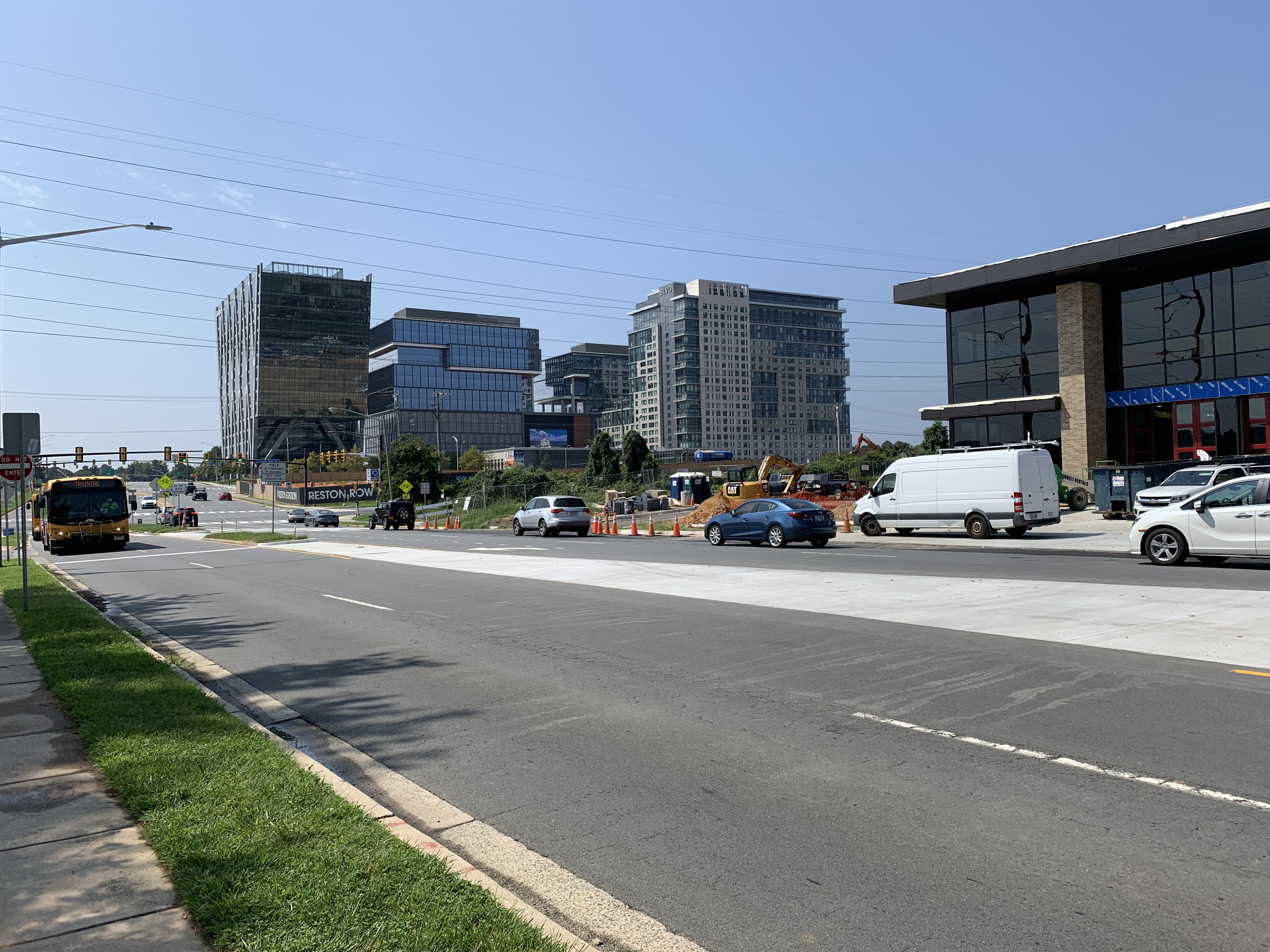
Reston Station as seen from Wiehle Avenue looking south in August 2021

Reston Station is a transit-oriented, mixed-use, urban employment center in the community of Reston in Fairfax County, Virginia. It is being developed through a public-private partnership between Fairfax County and Comstock Partners LC. The development, which provides access to the Wiehle–Reston East Metro station, consists of a subterranean Metro parking facility beneath a public plaza surrounded by office and residential high-rise buildings.

The Reston Station underground garage delivered as part of Phase 1 of the Silver Line in July 2014, on the same day that Metro's Silver Line began service. It is the only parking structure and transit-oriented development fully integrated with any of the Phase 1 expansion stations. After the opening of the Metro station, construction commenced on the buildings located on the plaza. Future development with residential, office, hotel, and retail uses is planned for the properties around the existing plaza and Metro station.

== Development ==
Reston Station will integrate more than 31,300,000 square feet (2,910,000 m^{2}) of mixed-use development consisting of more than 500,000 square feet (46,000 m^{2}) of Class A office space, approximately 100,000 square feet (9,300 m^{2}) of restaurants, shops, and service-oriented retailers, a 200-plus room hotel, and approximately 900 luxury residences. The Reston Station Metro Facility includes a commuter kiss and ride facility, a 10-bay transit bus depot, 2,300 commuter parking spaces, and a large secure bike room. Vertical transportation through the garage and the bus level leads visitors to Reston Station Plaza, which connects directly to the pedestrian overpass by which passengers cross the westbound lanes of the Dulles Toll Road to enter the Metro station situated in the highway median.

The Reston Station Metro garage facility construction project was one of the biggest of its type east of the Mississippi River. It required the excavation of over 500,000 cubic yards (382277 cubic meters) of dirt and over one million man hours to construct.

Development of an additional 310,000 square feet (29,000 m^{2}) on 8.4 acres (3.4 ha) north of Reston Station Boulevard—at the time referred to as "Reston Station Promenade"—received Fairfax County approval in 2018. Comstock planned to begin construction on this next phase in 2020, and ultimately broke ground in 2021, naming the new block "Reston Row."

== Reston Metro Plaza ==
The Reston Metro Plaza began development in June 2014 directly above the Reston Station Metro Facility and adjacent to the Silver Line Metro Station. Once completed, it will form the core of the greater Reston Station neighborhood; it includes multiple buildings connected by civic spaces dedicated to public activities throughout the year. Five buildings are planned, including office, residential, hotel and retail spaces. The first construction on the plaza was a high-rise apartment building. Comstock initially stated that construction of the office buildings would be phased and some or all would not begin without tenants signing leases (as a way to reduce risk and ensure costs are recouped). However, in 2015 Comstock began building the first of the three office buildings without any signed tenants, and ultimately signed leases on all three buildings in 2019.

== Reston Row ==
In 2020, Comstock completed the acquisition of the neighboring block between Sunset Hills Road and Reston Station Boulevard, on which an additional phase was developed, the "Reston Row District." The district consists of four buildings, and includes Virginia's first JW Marriott Hotel and Residences, an apartment building, and two office buildings, all surrounding a 1.2 acres (0.49 ha) park. Construction began in 2021, and the first building in Reston Row opened in 2024. The remaining buildings are planned to be completed in 2025.

== See also ==
- Reston Town Center
