= Tysons station =

Washington Metro station in Virginia, US

Tysons
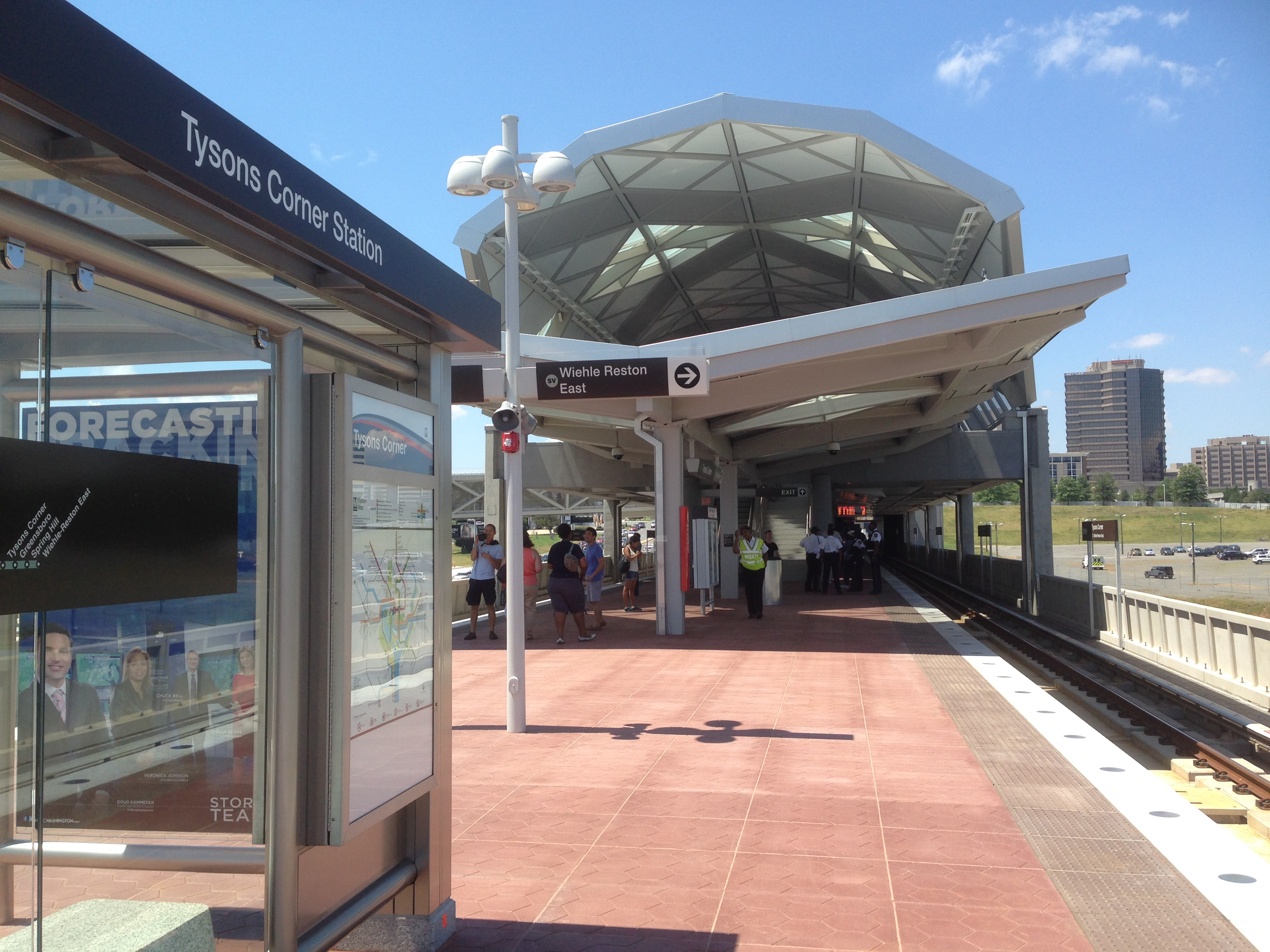
- Tysons station on opening day - July 26, 2014

General information
- Location: 1943 Chain Bridge Road; Tysons, Virginia
- Coordinates: 38.92063°N 77.22193°W
- Owner: WMATA
- Platforms: 1 island platform
- Tracks: 2
- Connections: Metrobus: A70, F20; Fairfax Connector: 401, 402, 423, 462, 463, 467, 494, 495, 660, 798

Construction
- Structure type: Elevated
- Cycle facilities: Capital Bikeshare, racks, lockers

Other information
- Station code: N02

History
- Opened: July 26, 2014; 12 years ago
- Former names: Tysons Corner (2014–2022)

Passengers
- 2025: 2,669 (average weekday)
- Rank: 67 of 98

Services
Preceding station	Washington Metro	Following station
Greensboro toward Ashburn	Silver Line	McLean toward Downtown Largo or New Carrollton
Route map
Location

Tysons station is a rapid transit station on the Silver Line of the Washington Metro in Tysons, Virginia, United States. One of four Metro stations in Tysons, it is one of the five stations comprising the first phase of the Silver Line. It opened as Tysons Corner on July 26, 2014.

== Station layout ==
Like other stations on the Silver Line, Tysons has an elevated island platform and two tracks with the western side of the platform facing a tunnel portal on an open cut. Access is provided by two entrances, one at street level at the northwest corner of the intersection of Chain Bridge Road and Tysons Boulevard and the other on the southwest corner; the sitting of the railway viaduct on the north side of Chain Bridge Road as well as pedestrian safety means that entrance to the station from this corner is by a pedestrian overpass to a mezzanine above platform level.

== History and location ==
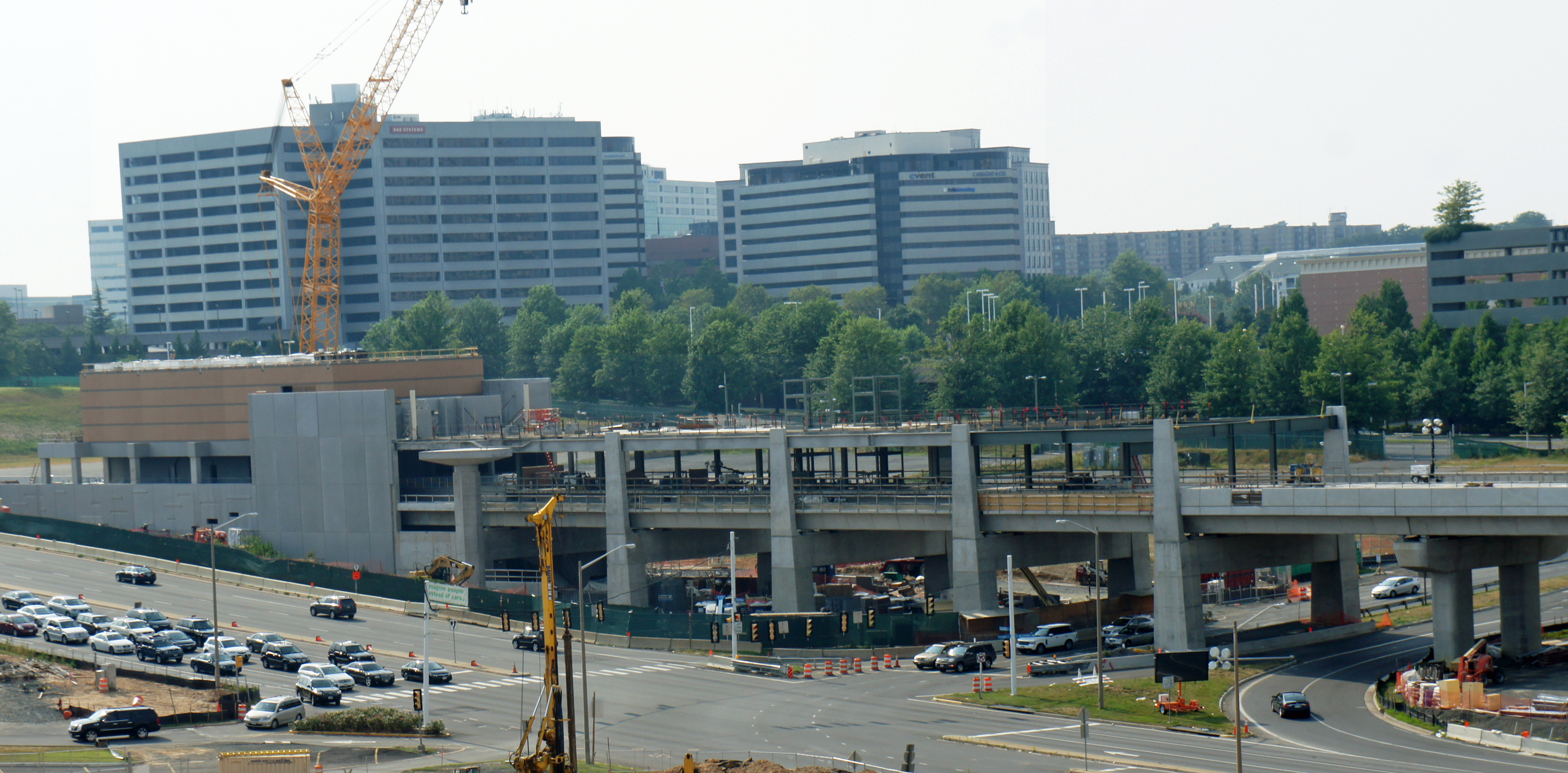
Construction of Tysons station in July 2012

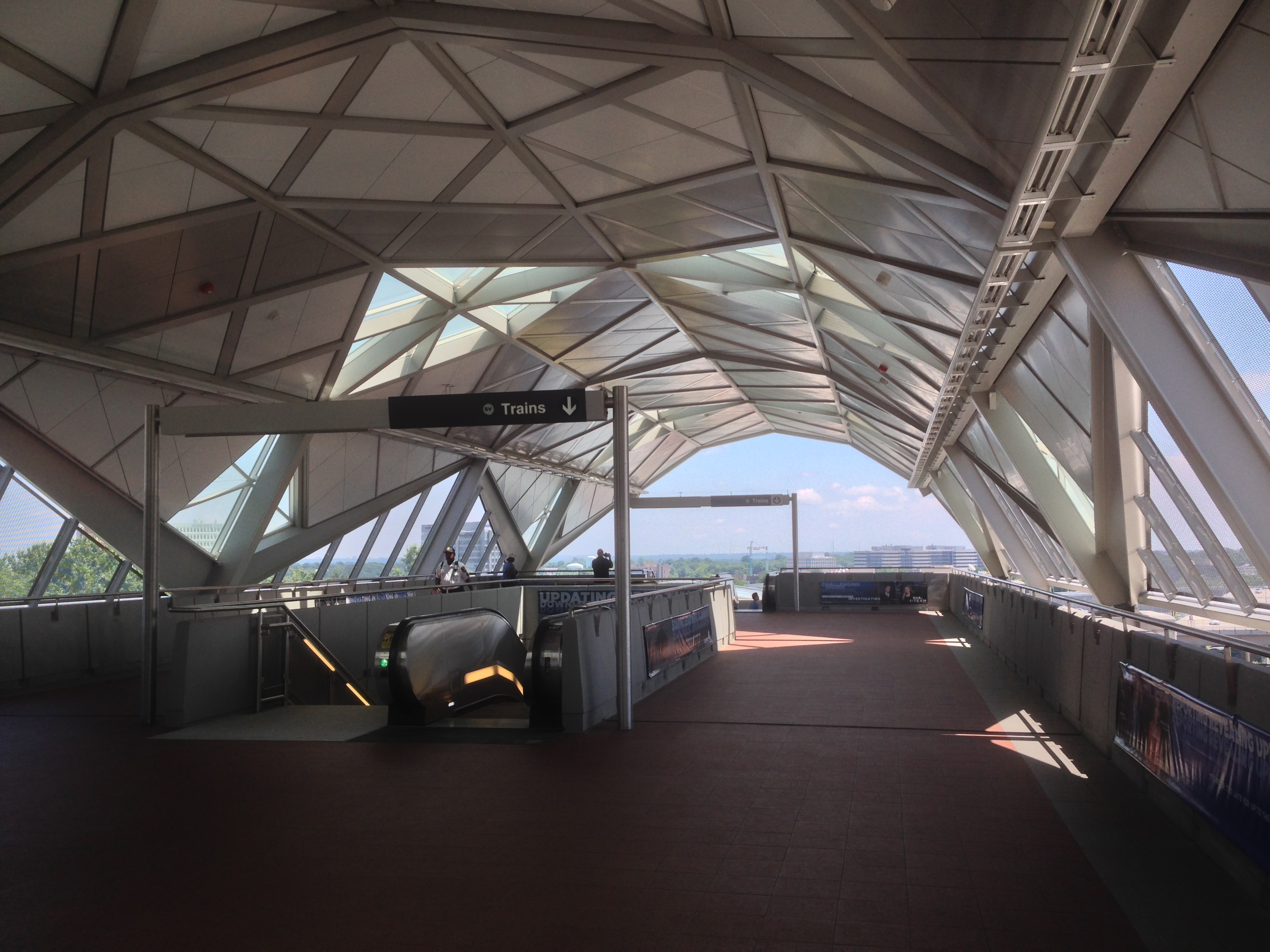
The station's mezzanine level in July 2014

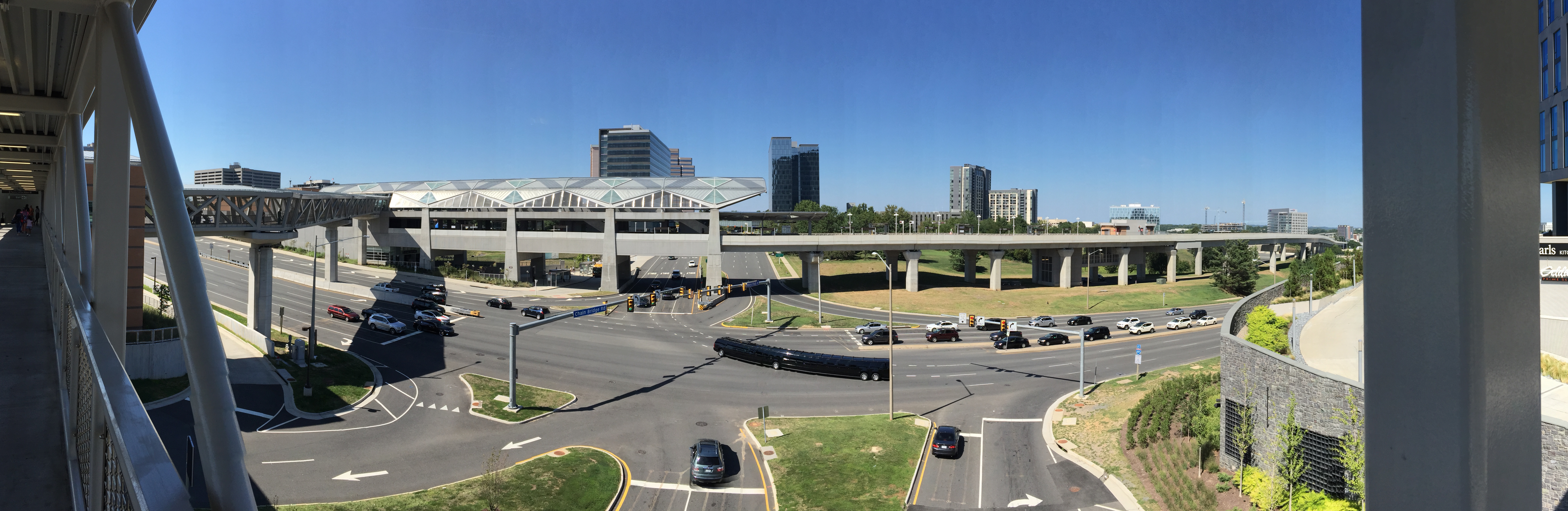
The station's exterior in August 2016

Tysons Corner station opened as part of the first phase of the Silver Line to Wiehle–Reston East in 2014. In the planning stages, controversy ensued over whether to build the Metro in a tunnel or on an elevated viaduct through Tysons. It was eventually decided that the majority of the line would be built above ground, but the station was built partially below ground in order to send trains through a short tunnel connecting the line's Route 7 and Route 123-paralleling sections.

One of four Metro stations within Tysons, the station is located in the heart of the edge city. Specifically, it lies above Chain Bridge Road (VA 123) at its intersection with Tysons Boulevard. It is the closest station to two of the region's most important attractions, Tysons Corner Center and Tysons Galleria, which combined house roughly 3 million square feet (280,000 m^{2}), or half of the region's retail space.

From May 23 until August 15, 2020, the station was closed for reconstruction of its platform west of Ballston–MU and the Silver Line Phase II tie construction. This station reopened beginning on August 16, 2020, when trains were able to bypass East Falls Church station.

=== Name change ===
In November 2020, WMATA approved a request from Fairfax County to change the name of Tysons Corner station to Tysons. The new name became effective on September 11, 2022.

=== Transit-oriented development ===
In order to reduce congestion and improve walkability and connectivity in the area, the Fairfax County Planning Commission created the "Tysons Corner Urban Center Comprehensive Plan", an outline for the urbanization of Tysons in conjunction with the opening of the Silver Line. As one of four Metro stations within the identified locale, the station is the focal point of one of the transit-oriented development schemes in the plan. According to the commission's outline, the area bounded by Westpark Drive, International Drive, Route 123, Route 7 and the Capital Beltway will be designated as the Tysons Central 7 District and contain high-density residential and commercial mixed-use development.

The plan envisions two major subdistricts, the North and South Tysons Central subdistricts, along with additional satellite subareas near the edges of the planning district. The North Tysons Central subdistrict is to be anchored by the Tysons Galleria and has been revised to handle a maximum of 6.8 million square feet (630,000 m^{2}) of developable space in conjunction with better pedestrian access and improved street grid connectivity. Buildings heights within the North Tysons Central subdistrict will reach up to 400 ft (122 m), among the highest in the metropolitan area.

Similarly, the South Tysons Central subdistrict is centered around Tysons Corner Center and has been upzoned for nearly 6 million square feet (560,000 m^{2}) of mixed-use space. New developments will be concentrated on the south side of Tysons Corner station and can reach 350 ft (107 m), with the possibility of density bonuses allowing growth to 400 ft (122 m). Additional changes are envisioned for the Towers Crescent and Watson Street subareas.
