= McLean station =

Washington Metro station in Virginia, US

McLean
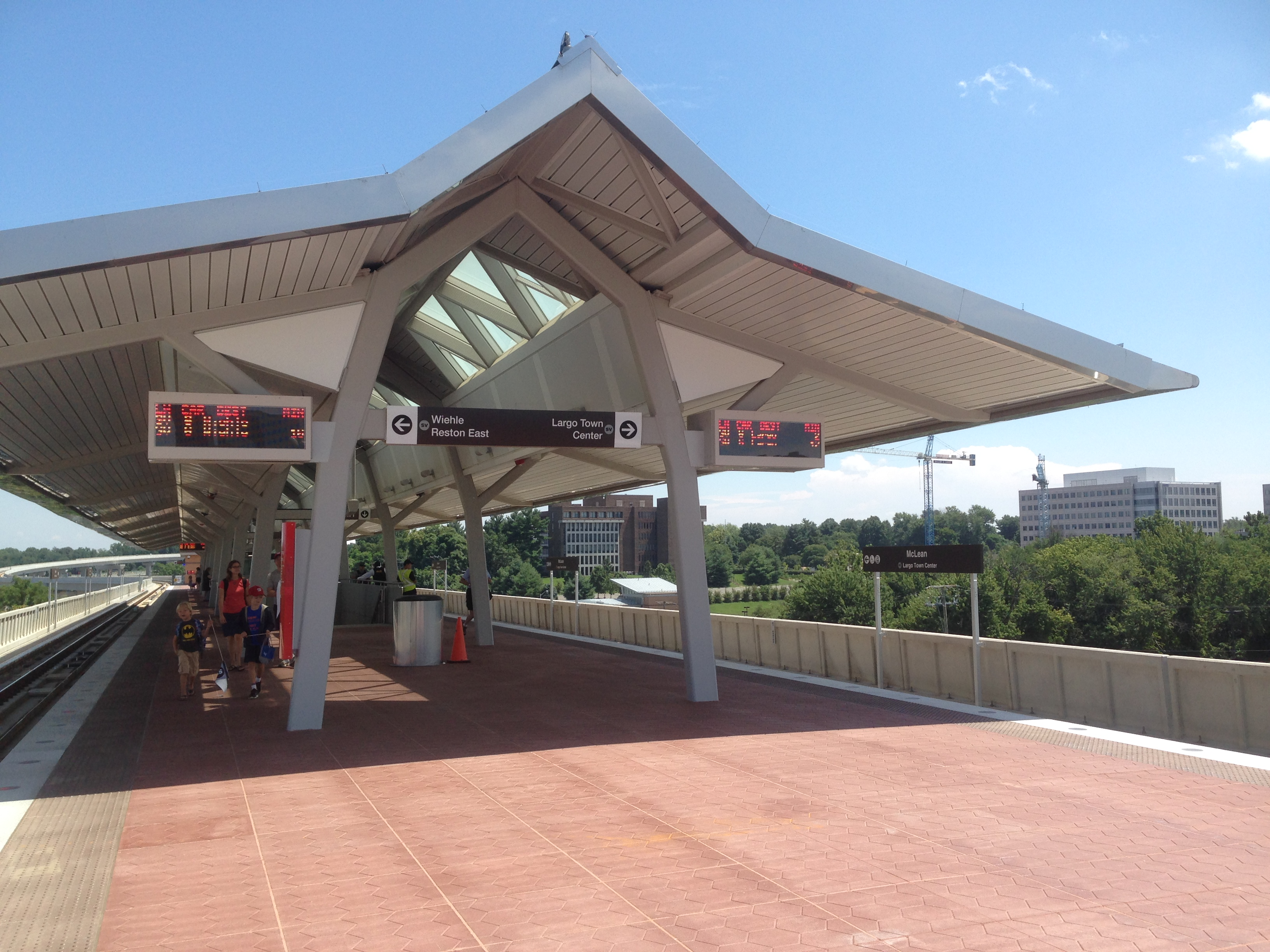
- McLean platform on opening day, July 26, 2014

General information
- Location: 1824 Dolley Madison Boulevard; McLean, Virginia
- Coordinates: 38.92434°N 77.21048°W
- Platforms: 1 island platform
- Tracks: 2
- Connections: Metrobus: A70; Fairfax Connector: 427, 480, 703, 721

Construction
- Structure type: Elevated
- Cycle facilities: Capital Bikeshare, racks, lockers

Other information
- Station code: N01

History
- Opened: July 26, 2014; 12 years ago

Passengers
- 2025: 2,498 (average weekday)
- Rank: 70 of 98

Services
Preceding station	Washington Metro	Following station
Tysons toward Ashburn	Silver Line	East Falls Church toward Downtown Largo or New Carrollton
Route map
Location

McLean station (preliminary names Tysons East, Tysons–McLean) is a Washington Metro station in Fairfax County, Virginia, United States, on the Silver Line. The station is located in the unincorporated community of Tysons, with a McLean postal address. It began operation on July 26, 2014.

== Station layout ==
Access to McLean station is provided by three entrances, two on the south side of the station on each side of SR 123 and one on the north side of the station. The southernmost entrance connects to the station mezzanine with a pedestrian bridge about 50 ft (15 m) above SR 123, with the mezzanine containing ticket machines and faregates. The north side entrance, opened in November 2025, offers direct access to Capital One's headquarters campus including Capital One Hall.

McLean has a simple island platform setup with two tracks. While there was some controversy about whether to build the rail through Tysons below ground or on elevated tracks, McLean is also elevated. No permanent car parking is planned at the station. A bus station and kiss-and-ride lot are on the southern side of SR 123. Bike parking is also available.

The main platform has a height of 55.5 ft (16.9 m) at its east end and 49 ft (15 m) at its west end.

== History ==
This station was one of 19 WMATA stations closed due to the 2020 coronavirus pandemic. Shuttle buses began serving the station on June 28, 2020.

From May 23 until August 15, 2020, this station was further closed due to the Platform Reconstruction west of Ballston–MU and the Silver Line Phase II tie construction. This station reopened beginning on August 16, 2020, when trains were able to bypass East Falls Church station.

On November 17, 2025, a new entrance with bicycle parking opened on the station's north side facing Capital One Drive, providing easier access to the development on Capital One's Tysons campus.

== Location ==
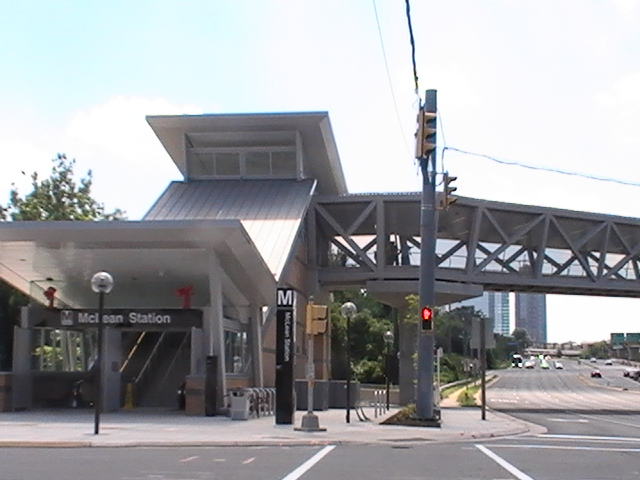
Station entrance on Opening Day, July 26, 2014

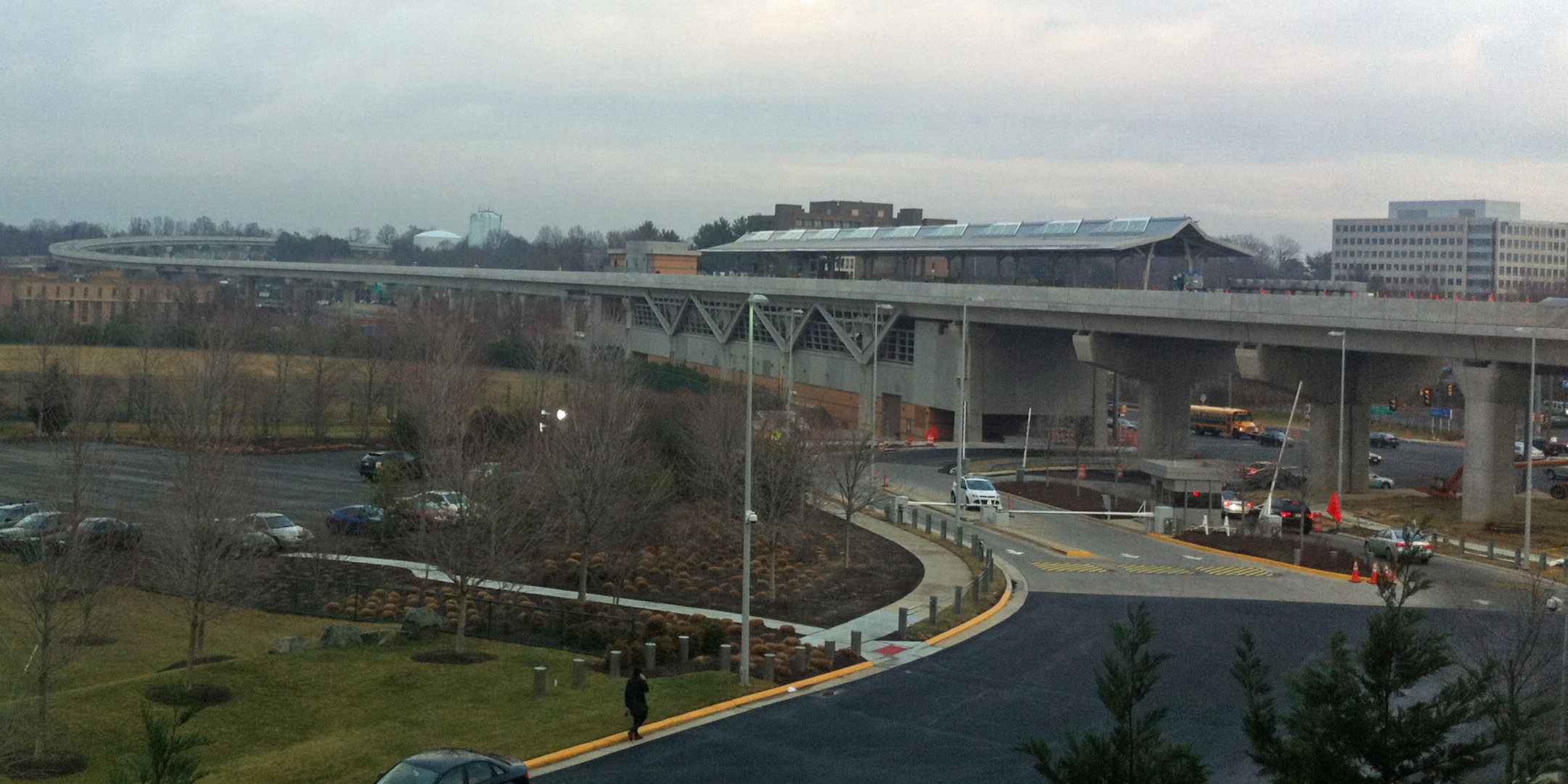
McLean station under construction in February 2013

McLean station is located in the northeast section of Tysons, at the northwest corner of the intersection of SR 123/Dolley Madison Boulevard and Scotts Crossing Road. This area is bordered on the south by SR 123, on the west by Exit 46A-B of the I-495/Capital Beltway, and by Exit 19A-B of SR 267. Virginia Department of Transportation (VDOT) traffic counts show heavy usage of all three roads in the area, with around 122,000 cars per day using SR 267 north of Exit 18; of these, about one-third continue on the Dulles Toll Road with the other two-thirds (67,000) using the Beltway. In addition, 44,000 cars use Dolley Madison Boulevard each day.

The station is located 2 miles (3.2 km) west of downtown McLean, Virginia. McLean itself took the name of the McLean station, of the former Great Falls and Old Dominion Railroad interurban trolley line, that the town grew around. Fairfax County's long-range transportation plan contains no plans for returning mass transit to the town of McLean, making it an appropriate name for the nearest Silver Line station.

The station serves the headquarters of Capital One, several intelligence agency facilities of the Federal government of the United States, various government contractors, and local residents. Tysons is nearby with major shopping malls.

== Station facilities ==
- 2 station entrances (each side of SR 123)
- Pedestrian bridge crossing SR 123
- Bus dropoff/pickup
- Kiss & Ride
- 56 bike parking spaces
