= Greensboro station (Washington Metro) =

Washington Metro station in Virginia, US

Greensboro
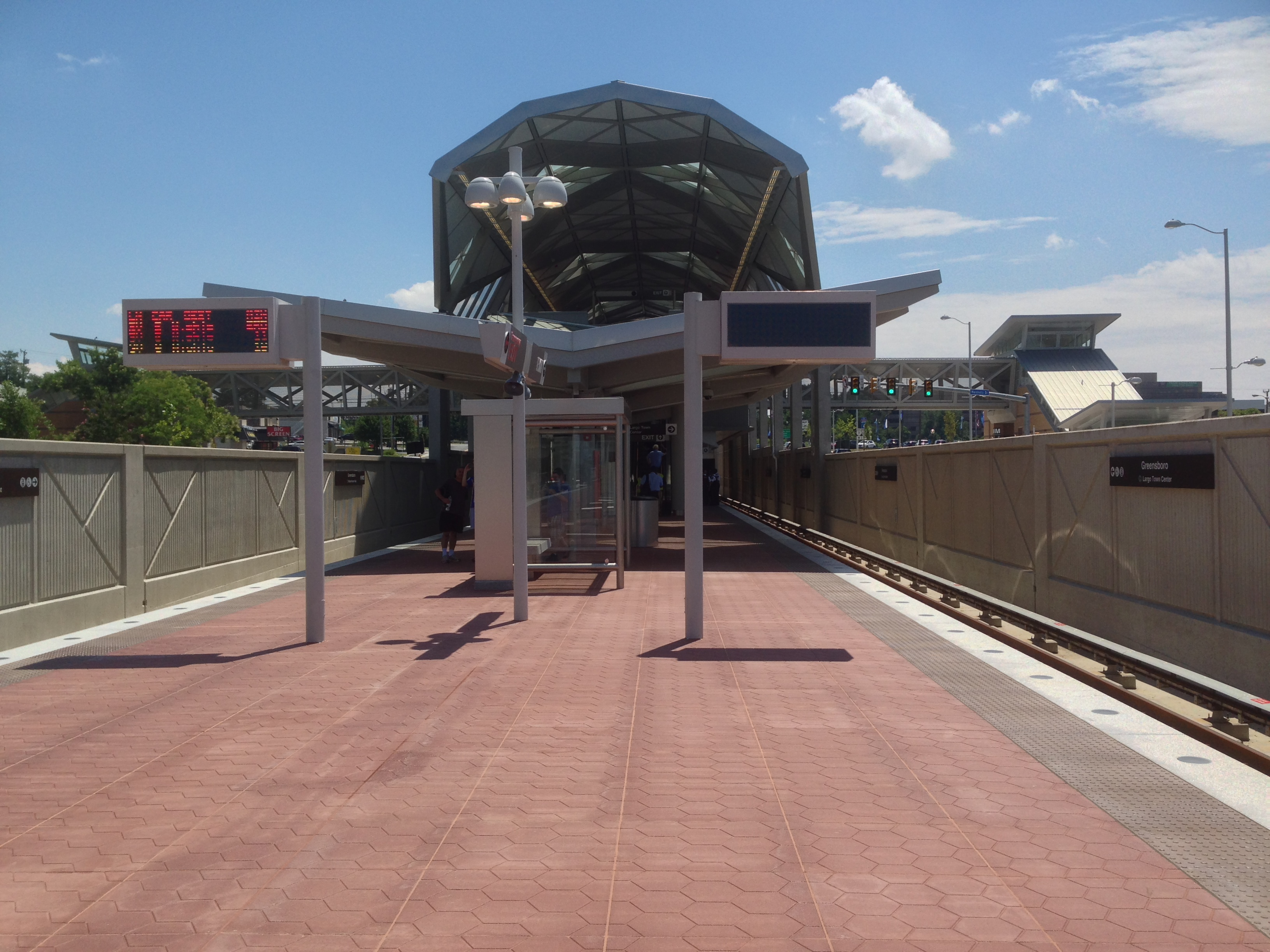
- Station platform on opening day, July 26, 2014

General information
- Location: 8305 Leesburg Pike; Tysons, Virginia
- Coordinates: 38.9215°N 77.2344°W
- Owner: WMATA
- Platforms: 1 island platform
- Tracks: 2

Construction
- Structure type: Open cut/raised embankment
- Cycle facilities: Capital Bikeshare, 20 bike lockers and 20 bike racks
- Accessible: yes

Other information
- Station code: N03

History
- Opened: July 26, 2014; 12 years ago

Passengers
- 2025: 1,215 (average weekday)
- Rank: 91 of 98

Services
Preceding station	Washington Metro	Following station
Spring Hill toward Ashburn	Silver Line	Tysons toward Downtown Largo or New Carrollton
Route map
Location

Greensboro station (preliminary names Tysons Central 7, Tysons Central) is a Washington Metro station in Tysons, Virginia, United States, on the Silver Line. It opened on July 26, 2014, as part of phase 1 of the Silver Line. Greensboro is one of four Metro stations in the Tysons area and is to be part of the massive regeneration of the district.

== Station layout ==
Like Spring Hill station, Greensboro was built in the median of SR 7 with a single island platform serving two tracks. However, unique among all Silver Line stations in Tysons, it was built partially at ground level and sub-surface. The construction and overall design of the station is similar to that of Southern Avenue on the Green Line because of its depressed but open-air layout. This is the result of the south end of the station acting as the western portal for the connecting tunnel leading to SR 123 while SR 7 slopes upwards towards the east. A mezzanine covering the central half of the platform contains ticket machines and faregates; two aerial walkway exits cross either side of Route 7 and meet at the mezzanine. The main platform has a height of −10 ft (−3.0 m) at its east end and 8 ft (2.4 m) at its west end.

== History ==
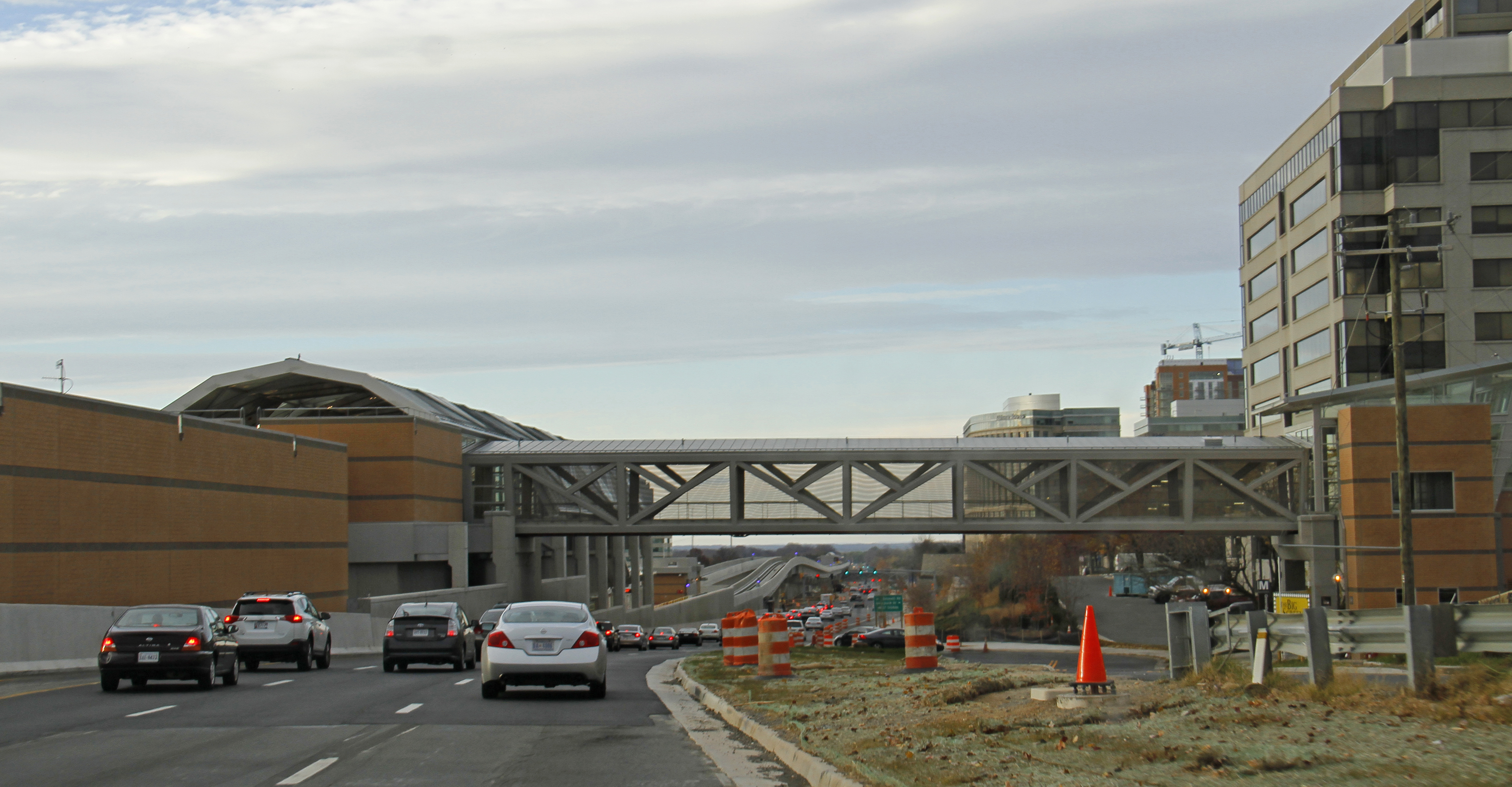
Exterior of the station during construction in November 2013

Greensboro station opened as part of the first phase of the Silver Line to Wiehle – Reston East in 2014. In the planning stages, controversy ensued over whether to build the Metro in a tunnel or on an elevated viaduct through Tysons. It was eventually decided that the majority of the line would be built above ground, but the station will be built partially below ground in order to send trains through a short tunnel connecting the line's Route 7 and Route 123-paralleling sections.

From March 26 until June 27, 2020, this station was closed due to the 2020 coronavirus pandemic. Shuttle buses began serving the station on June 28, 2020.

From May 23 until August 15, 2020, this station was further closed due to the Platform Reconstruction west of Ballston–MU and the Silver Line Phase II tie construction. This station reopened beginning on August 16, 2020, when trains were able to bypass East Falls Church.

== Location ==
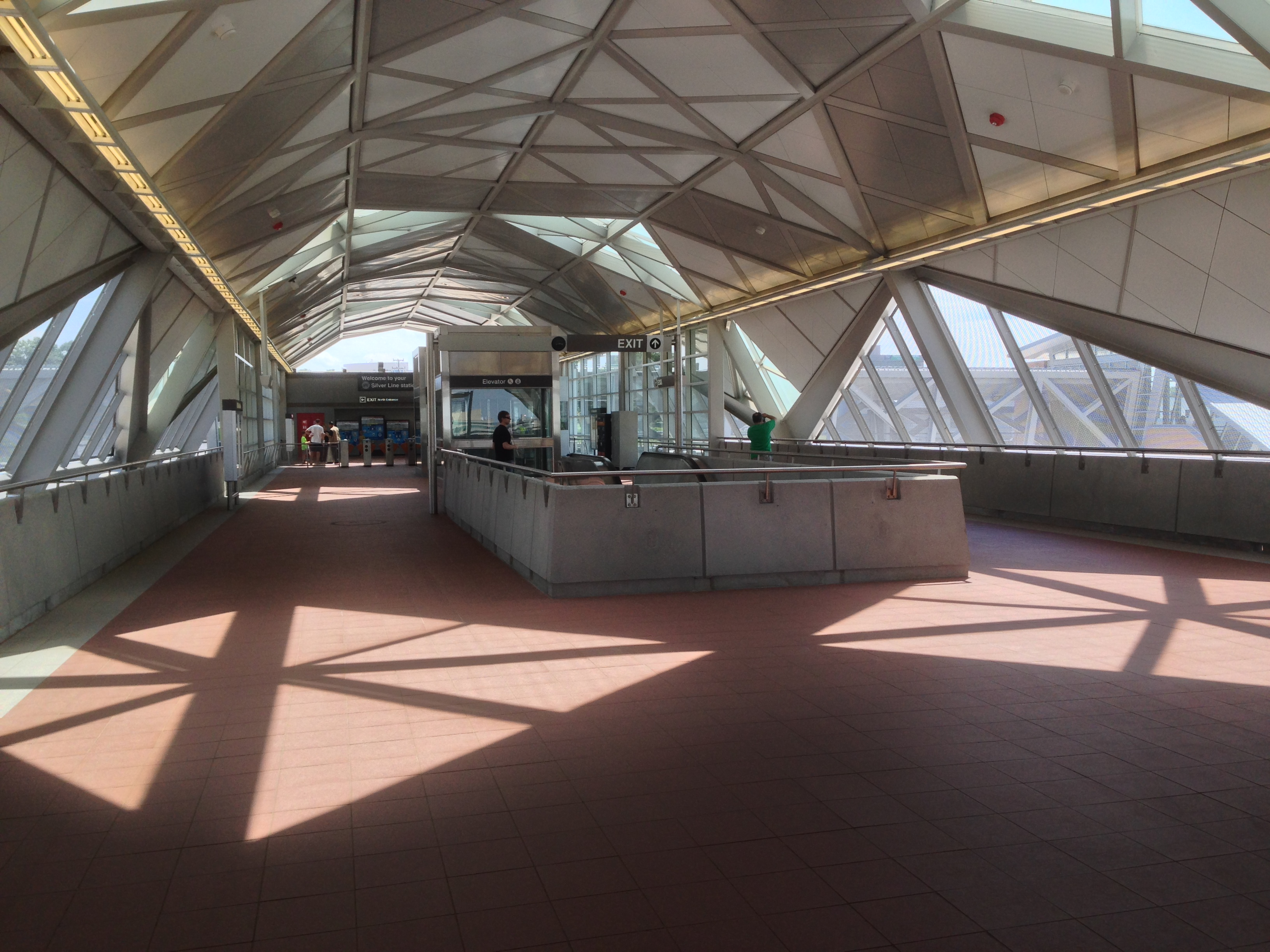
Mezzanine level of the station

Greensboro station is located within west-central Tysons, specifically in the median of Route 7 (Leesburg Pike). Much of the surrounding area is commercial in nature, with the Pike Seven Plaza Shopping Center to the west and Tysons Galleria to the east. In the way of residential development, The Boro mixed-use district opened its first phase in 2019 to the immediate north. When fully completed, the initial phase will include two residential high-rises, an office tower, and a cinema complex, in addition to the already-existing office buildings.

Traffic counts by the Virginia Department of Transportation (VDOT) show that the section of Leesburg Pike on which the station sits is the most heavily used in Fairfax County, with 61,000 vehicles per day using the stretch of road between Route 123 and the Dulles Toll Road.

=== Transit-oriented development ===
In order to reduce congestion and improve walkability and connectivity in the area, the Fairfax County Planning Commission created the "Tysons Corner Urban Center Comprehensive Plan", an outline for the urbanization of Tysons in conjunction with the opening of the Silver Line. As one of four Metro stations within the identified locale, Greensboro is the focal point of one of the transit-oriented development schemes in the plan. According to the commission's outline, the area bounded by Route 123, Gosnell Drive, Westpark Drive, and International Drive will be designated as the Tysons Central 7 District and contain high-density residential and commercial mixed-use development.

The Tysons Central 7 District is divided into two sub-districts, North and South, separated by Route 7. The south sub-district is approximately 76 acres (31 ha) large and will contain mixed-use development, with offices predominating near the station and residential buildings in the outer transition zone. The plan calls for a "civic commons" to be the central open space in the sub-district with government and civi-related buildings surrounding it. The north sub-district is similar in nature, but is 102 acres (41 ha) in area. In contrast, the north sub-district is planned to be more vibrant and 24-hour than the south, with a minimum building height of 175 feet (53 m), although both sectors have a maximum allowance of 400 feet (122 m). To connect these districts, it is envisioned that Leesburg Pike will be reconfigured, along with Chain Bridge Road, to a "boulevard" design, with a median separating four lanes of traffic each way, as well as landscaping the sidewalks to improve walkability. Radiating out from Route 7 will be a series of avenues and collector streets, each with different regulations to create a hierarchical street grid.

== Station facilities ==
- 2 station entrances (each side of Route 7)
- Pedestrian bridge crossing Route 7
- Bus dropoff/pickup
- Public restroom
