= Silver Line (Washington Metro) =

Washington Metro rapid transit line

- A Silver Line train arriving at Federal Center SW in September 2023

Overview
- Locale: Washington metropolitan area
- Termini: Ashburn; Downtown Largo New Carrollton
- Stations: 39

Service
- Type: Rapid transit
- System: Washington Metro
- Operator: Washington Metropolitan Area Transit Authority
- Rolling stock: 3000-series, 6000-series, 7000-series

History
- Opened: July 26, 2014 (Phase 1); November 15, 2022 (Phase 2)

Technical
- Line length: 48.5 mi (78.1 km)
- Num of tracks: 2
- Character: At-grade, elevated, and underground
- Track gauge: 4 ft 8 1/4 in (1,429 mm)
- Electrification: Third rail, 750 V DC
Route map
Silver Line highlighted in silver

The Silver Line is a rapid transit line of the Washington Metro system, consisting of 39 stations in Loudoun County, Fairfax County and Arlington County, Virginia, Washington, D.C., and Prince George's County, Maryland. The Silver Line runs from Ashburn in Loudoun County, Virginia to Largo and New Carrollton in Prince George's County, Maryland. Five stations, from both lines' eastern terminus at Largo to Benning Road, are shared with the Blue Line alone; five stations are shared with the Orange Line alone from both lines eastern terminus at New Carrollton to Minnesota Avenue; thirteen stations, from Stadium–Armory to Rosslyn, with both the Orange Line and Blue Lines; and five stations from Court House to East Falls Church with the Orange Line alone. Only the 11 stations from McLean to Ashburn are exclusive to the Silver Line. Five of these 11 stations began service on July 26, 2014 as Phase 1, and six began service as Phase 2 on November 15, 2022.

The 11.7-mile (18.8 km) portion of the Silver Line between its split from the Orange Line and Wiehle–Reston East is entirely in Fairfax County, Virginia and was constructed as Phase 1 of the Dulles Corridor Metrorail Project. Phase 2 expanded the line another 11.5 miles (18.5 km) to Ashburn in Loudoun County via Dulles International Airport. The $6.01 billion, 23.1-mile Dulles Corridor Metrorail Project is Metro's largest expansion by route mileage since its inception in 1976.

Trains run every 10 minutes during weekday rush hours, every 12 minutes during weekday off-peak hours and weekends, and every 15 minutes daily after 9:30pm.

== History ==
=== Planning ===
==== Early Dulles extension proposals ====
The U.S. federal government, which owned and operated Dulles International Airport before Congress created the MWAA, built the Dulles Access Road in the 1960s to connect the airport to Washington, D.C., by way of Virginia State Route 267. As the access road was built, the authorities opted to reserve the median of the road for some form of rail transit, and the nearby West Falls Church was designed so that the line could eventually be extended in this direction. The original 1968 Metrorail plan included an eventual extension to Dulles airport. In 1969, U.S. Senator from Virginia William B. Spong Jr. tried unsuccessfully to have the extension to Dulles be built as part of an early stage of the system rather than having it be built some time in the future. A $130,000 study of the feasibility of a Metrorail extension to Dulles was authorized that year; the study, published in 1971, estimated that 30,000 people would ride the extension each day.

In the 1980s, U.S. Senator Paul Trible and U.S. Representative Frank R. Wolf again proposed that the federal government study extending Metrorail to Dulles Airport. A $500,000 grant to study the feasibility of extending Metrorail to Dulles was announced in late 1994. The Virginia General Assembly authorized the Commonwealth Transportation Board (CTB) in 1995 to provide for "additional improvements to the Dulles Toll Road and Dulles Access Road corridor including, but not limited to, mass transit, including rail and capacity-enhancing treatments from surplus net revenues of the Dulles Toll Road". The same year, a panel composed of Virginia state and municipal officials proposed a $1.6 billion Metrorail extension to Dulles Airport, which would also include stops in Loudoun County, Herndon, Reston, and Tysons. This extension, if built, would branch off the Orange Line. The Loudoun County government also proposed setting aside space for a rail maintenance yard in an attempt to convince Metrorail officials to approve the extension.

In 1998, Raytheon engineers and constructors proposed to build and operate a Dulles Corridor Bus Rapid Transit (BRT) system. In January 1999, the Tysons-Dulles Corridor Group (which included Bechtel Corporation and West*Group) offered a competing BRT proposal that would ultimately extend the rail line to Ashburn. There was also a proposal for a 7-mile (11 km) circular Metrorail extension with seven stops in Tysons, along with an express bus traveling from Tysons to Dulles. These proposals prompted the Virginia Department of Transportation (VDOT) to evaluate the merits of BRT and heavy rail public transit in the corridor.

==== Significant progress and approval ====
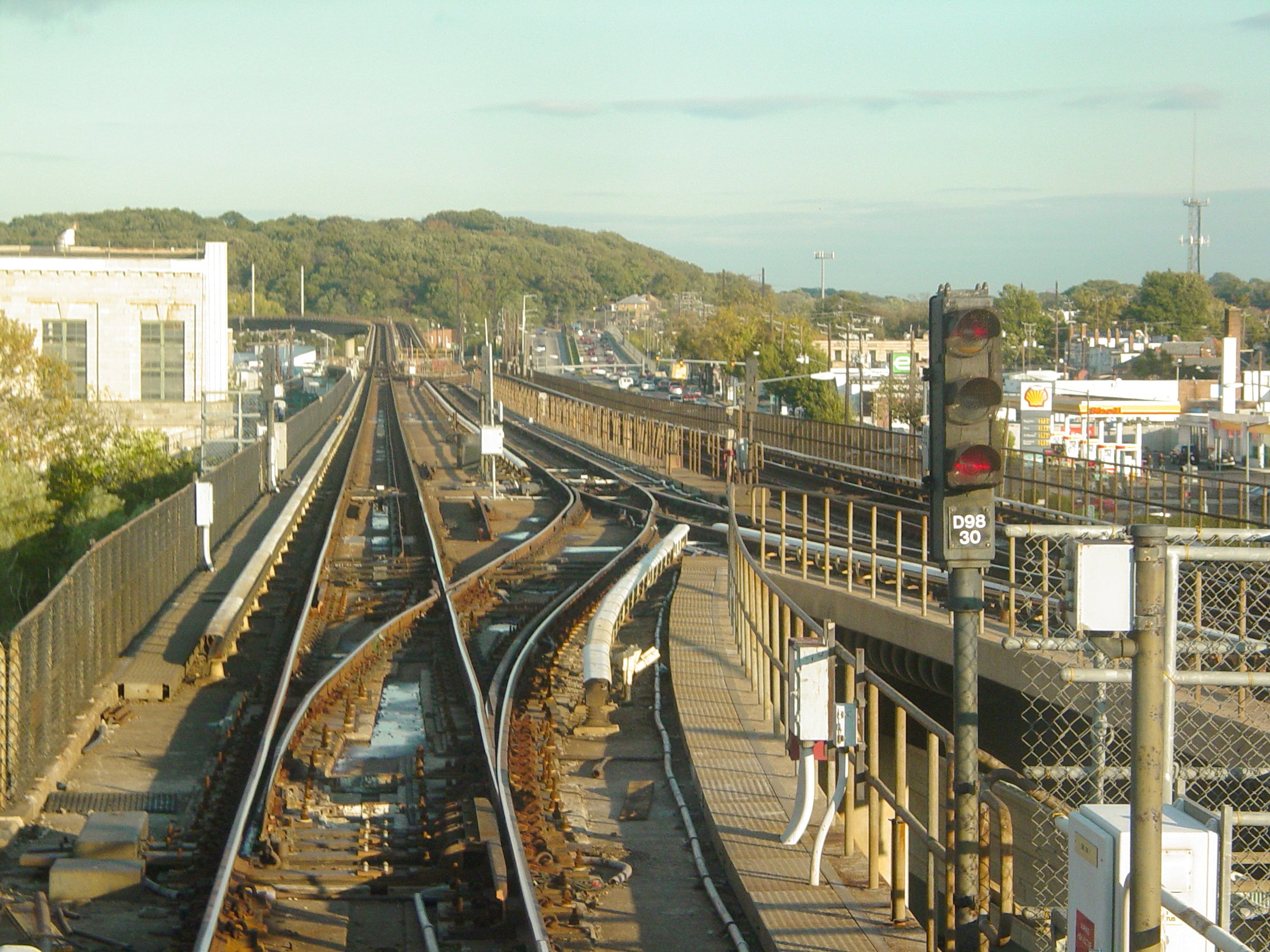
As originally planned, Silver Line trains were to reverse course using the D98 pocket track east of the Stadium–Armory station. However, safety concerns raised in December 2012 required service to be extended to Largo.

Local residents and officials had talked of a Metro extension to Dulles since the Washington Metro began service in 1976, but significant planning did not begin until 2000. The Dulles Corridor Rapid Transit Project "scoping" process began in April 2000 with a series of meetings with local and federal officials, designed to collect the necessary authorities for the project. Local and federal law required extensive Analysis of Alternatives – the two most likely being bus lanes or inaction – and of the environmental impact. The rail-only line won over the other alternatives. Initial environmental hearings, which closed on August 28, 2002, were positive. Although planners originally considered ending the first phase at Tysons, state officials decided that the first phase would end at Reston's Wiehle Avenue, partially to reassure the Metropolitan Washington Airports Authority that the line would eventually run to Dulles Airport. The project received formal approval on June 10, 2004.

In February 2005, the CTB approved a 50 cent increase in the Dulles Toll Road toll rates, effective May 22, 2005, and "reaffirm[ed] that no less than 85% of existing surplus Dulles Toll Road net revenues shall be dedicated for mass transit and rail in the [Dulles] Corridor" and provided "that all additional toll revenue generated from the May 22, 2005 toll adjustment shall be dedicated to the [Metrorail] Project." Between July 1, 2003, and November 1, 2008, when the toll road was transferred to MWAA, over $138 million in net surplus toll revenue (together with accumulated interest) was provided to MWAA for the Silver Line project.

==== Financing ====
Although the original financing plan called for a 50-cent toll increase on the Dulles Toll Road to finance the Silver Line (25 cents at the main plaza and 25 cents at the ramp plazas), the increase in projected costs resulted in the MWAA Board approving an increase in the surcharges. Effective January 1, 2010, the fare surcharge was increased to 50 cents at both the main plaza and ramp plazas, with additional 25-cent increases in main-plaza tolls set for 2011 and 2012. These toll surcharges are designed to support MWAA's 52.6% share of the projected $5.25 billion combined cost of Phase 1 and Phase 2. MWAA has justified these toll increases as necessary to meet an estimated $220 million in annual debt-service costs projected by 2020. These toll revenue requirements were based on the assumption that the federal government, although it contributed $900 million to Phase 1, would not contribute funds for Phase 2.

As a result of the surcharge increases, the toll in 2012 was $2.25, or 16 cents per mile (1.6 km). The toll increase proposal drew 221 public comments and opponents outnumbered supporters by about 3 to 1. However, as the cost estimate grew from $5.25 billion to $6.8 billion, no final decisions have been reached to address the projected shortfall.

==== Tysons Corner tunnel dispute ====
As part of the preliminary engineering process from 2000 to 2004, WMATA explored the possibility of twin tunnels running from the east of the McLean station to the west of the Spring Hill station, with all four stations on that stretch to be below ground. Planners rejected that option (Alignment T13) on the grounds that "it would cost $3.5 billion, which is approximately $422 million higher than the cost for [mostly aerial] Alignment T6. Alignment T13 would also have a greater potential for cost escalation than other alignments evaluated in the Draft EIS because underground construction poses risks that cannot be completely identified prior to construction. Most of the significant risks relate to unknown subsurface conditions such as soil conditions, utilities, hazardous materials, and archaeological resources." Instead, they favored an alignment that relied on aerial structures, with just a short tunnel, running only between the Tysons Corner (now Tysons) and Greensboro stations (underneath higher ground) with all four stations being at or above ground.

Starting in 2005, WMATA engineers explored the possibility of tunneling under Tysons with a large-bore tunneling machine, providing space for two tracks and stations within a bore with a diameter of 40 feet (12 meters) or more. The contractor found that there would not be a significant cost reduction and proposed staying with the short tunnel option.

After allegations that the design contractor had inflated costs for the tunnel in order to avoid sharing the job with an outside tunneling contractor, the long tunnel concept was revived in April 2006. The allegations led to calls for an outside cost estimate to determine more realistic tunnel costs. On May 15, 2006, Virginia Transportation Secretary Pierce Homer announced the creation of an advisory panel headed by the American Society of Civil Engineers. The panel had about two months to evaluate options for completing the line through Tysons, with the results presented to the state on July 27, 2006 and published on July 31, 2006.

On September 6, 2006, Virginia Governor Tim Kaine announced his decision in favor of an elevated track through Tysons. In his statement, Kaine said he believed a tunnel would be the best option, but decided against it, citing a fear of losing federal funding for the project.

Shortly after Governor Kaine's decision, the Greater McLean Chamber of Commerce formed a coalition of tunnel supporters, called Tysons Tunnel, Inc. and put forth a technical proposal to help revive consideration of building a tunnel through Tysons. The Virginia Department of Rail and Public Transportation hired an independent consultant to assess the coalition's proposal. However, the consultant's report – sent to Secretary Homer on March 7, 2007, stated that "[t]here is a significant risk that the project cost of a Large Bore Tunnel would not meet the Federal Transit Administration's cost-effectiveness ratio criteria, which could compromise federal funding for the project".

On November 26, 2007, Tysons Tunnel, Inc. filed a lawsuit against the United States Department of Transportation and the Federal Transit Administration (FTA) in the Eastern District of Virginia challenging the denial of their petition to reopen and consider additional evidence regarding the benefits of a tunnel over the aerial option. Gary Baise, the Republican challenger to Gerry Connolly's Fairfax County Board of Supervisors Chairmanship, represented Tysons Tunnel. By 2010, Tysons Tunnel, Inc. ceased operations.

==== Federal Transit Administration decisions ====
Start of construction was delayed as approval of the $900 million federal contribution to project costs awaited the conclusion of FTA's review of the proposal submitted by Virginia. Elected officials of the state, including Governor Tim Kaine and U.S. Senators John Warner and Jim Webb, arrived at the FTA on January 24, 2008, to address last minute concerns by FTA staff and administrators. FTA Administrator James Simpson presented Governor Kaine with a letter that contained stark criticisms of the project as presented. The project as presented was given a "medium–low" rating (projects must receive a "medium" or higher rating to be approved under the Federal New Starts Funds project) and determined ineligible to receive the $900 million in federal funding. FTA's concerns included the Metropolitan Washington Airports Authority's inexperience in large design-build contracts, an exaggeration of funding numbers from the Dulles Toll Road and an inability for Metro to maintain the 23-mile (37 km) line once it had been built. Virginian leaders vowed to address the concerns by January 28, 2008, as several fixed price contracts for building materials costs were due to expire on February 1. Governor Kaine requested an extension of the deadline to February 1, which was granted by the FTA.

On April 30, 2008, the FTA reversed the earlier decision and approved the above-ground project, saying that it met standards for cost efficiency, construction and ridership, moving it closer to receiving the $900 million in federal funding. Officials told The Washington Post that the project would move into the final design stage. The FTA approved funding for the project on December 4, 2008.

On March 10, 2009, U.S. Transportation Secretary Ray LaHood signed the formal agreement that awarded the $900 million promised by the federal government for construction of the Silver Line, with major construction expected to begin in several weeks. Utility relocation work started at Tysons in mid-2008.

=== Construction ===
Project logo

MWAA planned to award a separate design-build contract for Phase 2. The Phase 2 contract was awarded in May 2013 and the projected completion date was to be in 2018. However, it was later extended to 2022.

Although construction was planned to begin in 2005, the delays in approval of funding pushed back the start date. To facilitate Silver Line construction, responsibility for the project was transferred on November 1, 2008, from the Virginia Department of Transportation (VDOT) to the MWAA. Utility relocation work began in 2008, and construction began on March 12, 2009. The full line to Ashburn, including a station at Dulles International Airport, was at the time expected to be completed in late 2016 or 2017.

==== Pier support ====
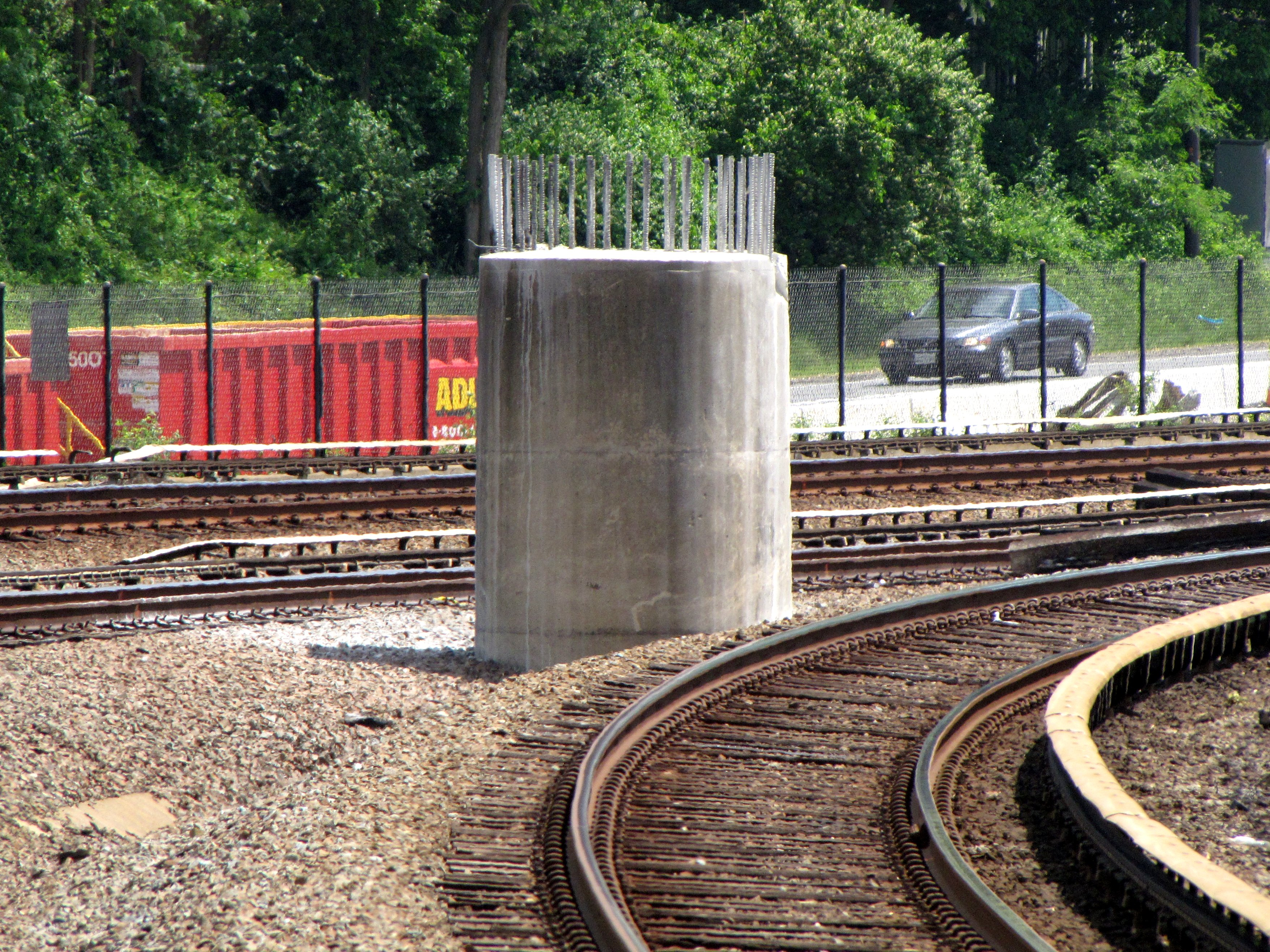
2010 view of a then unused bridge pier near West Falls Church station, intended to support a Silver Line bridge

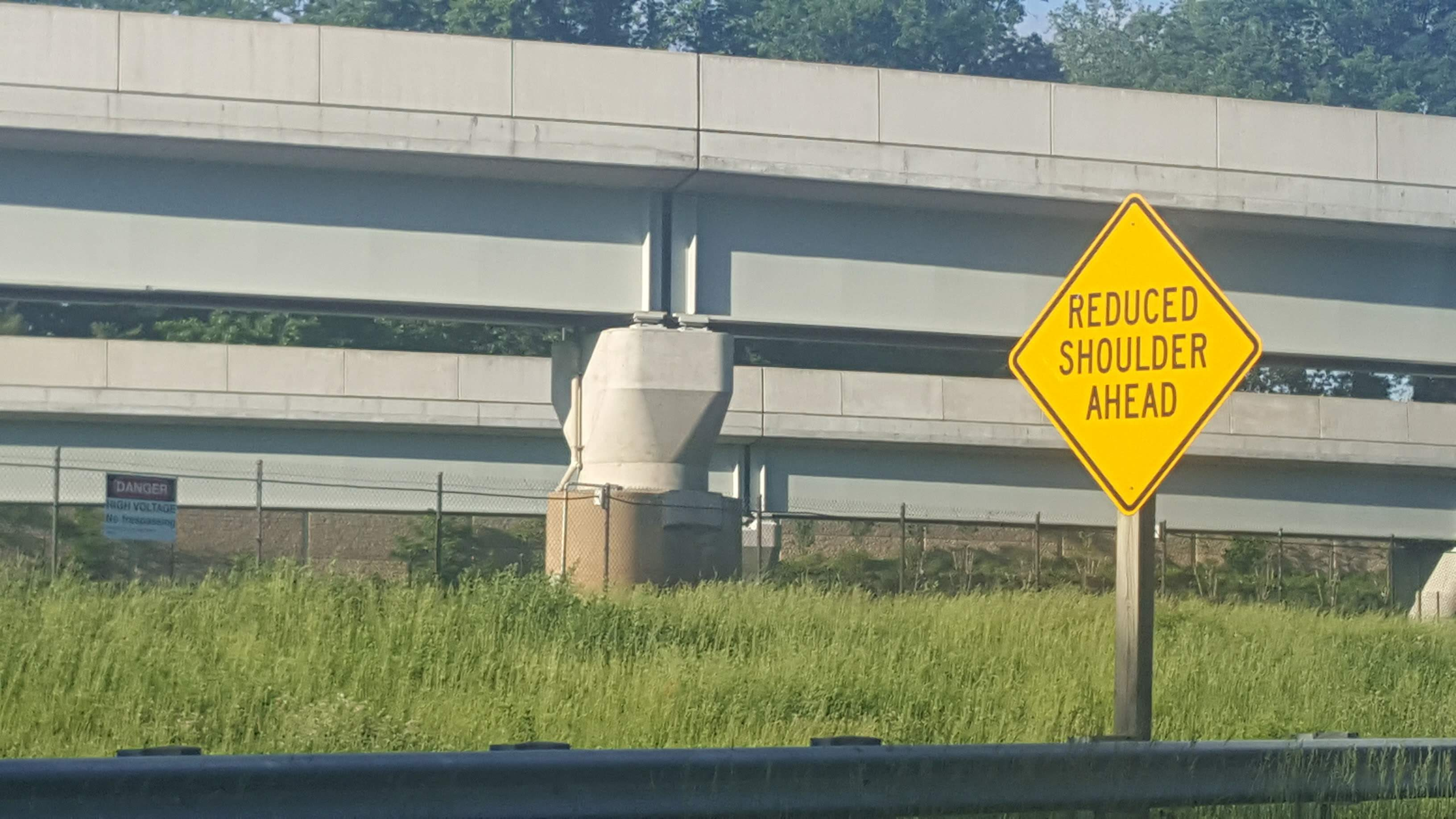
The same bridge pier after construction completed

When the Orange Line was originally constructed in 1977, foundations for the bridges to carry the Silver Line over I-66 to the median of the Dulles Access Road were built up to ground level. These foundations included steel piles that were driven into the ground and capped with concrete. However, detailed records for these original foundations were lost. As a result, engineers asked for the foundations to be inspected by digging around them to determine the condition of each pile under the concrete foundation caps.

Some of the foundations are located in confined spots adjacent to I-66 and the electrified third rail of the Orange Line, making access difficult. Dulles Transit Partners offered to inspect seven foundations that were easily accessible, but the FTA insisted that all foundations be tested. Dulles Transit Partners and MWAA agreed to test all foundations before the bridge piers were built upon them. This required the portion of the Orange Line between the West Falls Church and East Falls Church Metro stations to be taken out of service on weekends while the tests were conducted. All foundations were acceptable and the bridge construction proceeded using the existing foundations.

==== Controversy ====
There has been controversy over the contract between the MWAA and Dulles Transit Partners, which consists of Bechtel and Washington Group International. The $2.7 billion project was originally awarded by the Virginia Department of Rail and Public Transportation (DRPT) under the Virginia Public-Private Partnership Act, rather than by using conventional competitive bidding based upon a detailed specification. As a result, the contractor is allowed to both design and build the project with no upper cap on its cost. Problems could arise from the arrangement where MWAA is supervising the design and construction but ultimately WMATA must operate the Silver Line. The contract provides for price escalation of $3 million to $6 million a month for delays. VDRPT transferred the contract to MWAA when MWAA took over the project in June 2007.

=== Opening of Phase 1 ===
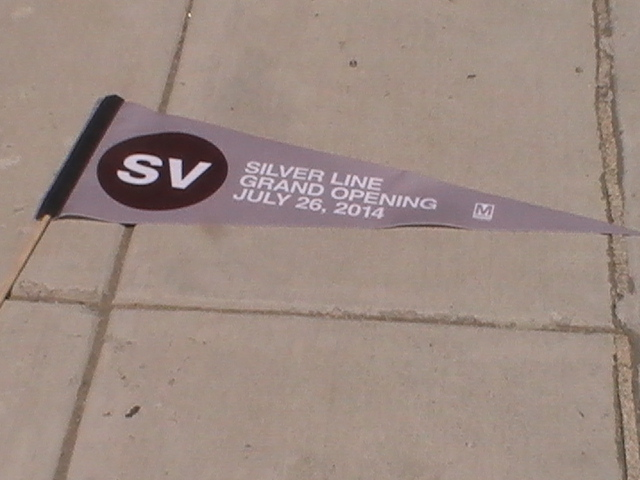
Pennant given to users of the Silver Line on its grand opening, July 26, 2014.

The original schedule planned for revenue service to begin in 2013. The contractor reported to MWAA on February 7, 2014, that construction was complete. MWAA had fifteen days to review the documentation and decide whether it agreed, but on February 24 they announced that the contractor had failed to meet seven of twelve criteria outlined in the contract.

On March 19, 2014, MWAA announced additional delays in the project due to public address speakers and a communications cable that did not meet code and did not offer a new completion date. They hoped to turn it over to WMATA by April 9, 2014. WMATA requires an additional 90 days for testing and training. The system then underwent 90 days of testing and staff training. This suggested, at the time, that the line could open as early as July 4, 2014. On May 27, 2014, WMATA was handed over control of the line, with service to begin "within 90 days". Finally, on June 24, 2014, it was revealed that the official opening date for the first five stations had been set for July 26.

After a set of speeches and announcements prior to opening, which were televised on local cable television station News Channel 8, and attended by the Governor of Virginia, Terry McAuliffe, Metro General Manager Richard Sarles, the entire Metro board of directors, District of Columbia Mayor Vincent C. Gray, and other regional politicians, a ribbon cutting took place at Wiehle–Reston East, and shortly after noon on July 26, 2014, the five new stations were opened for passenger service. Service initially traveled between Wiehle–Reston East and Largo.

Although the Silver Line attracted riders, its average weekday boarding was 17,100 during its first year of operations instead of the projected 25,000 riders.

==== Effect on the Metro map ====
Metro's iconic rail map, in distribution since Lance Wyman and Bill Cannan (Wyman & Cannan) designed it in 1976, takes – according to some observers – a "pop art" approach to representing its subway network. The Metro rail map uses thick strokes to mark its radial lines. To fit in the current space and make use of the iconography as currently proportioned, the map relies upon the fact that no more than two lines overlap at any single location. The addition of the Silver Line creates a three-line overlap from Rosslyn to Stadium–Armory, a fact that led WMATA to publicly announce in 2010 that it was considering a new map design. A number of unofficial attempts by graphic designers to redraw the Washington Metro map to include the Silver Line have done so by thinning the strokes throughout.

In 2003, predating Booth's attempt, WMATA released a professionally designed graphic that displayed the Silver Line on an unofficial map that resembled the current version, but with thin lines. The interplay between Metro's unofficial proposal and those of other designers received attention in a number of press outlets. A poster displaying a map of similar design has been hanging in DC Councilman Jack Evans' office for a number of years, but received scant attention until 2008. Wyman, one of the original designers of the map, was confirmed as the layout specialist who would be redesigning the map by The Washington Post on June 4, 2011.

A thick-line version of the map, released as part of Metro's Rush Plus plan, showed the Silver Line spurring off the Orange Line between the Ballston and East Falls Church stations in a northwesterly direction, with five unlabeled stops (the Phase 1 stations). The final map released for the Silver Line's Phase 1 opening features the stations shared by the three lines as normal stations, with the dots signifying stations located on the colored line in the center and small white stubs extending from the center dots into the adjoining colored lines.

=== Phase 2: Dulles extension ===
Unofficial Washington Metro system map with the Dulles extension

While construction of Phase 1 to Wiehle–Reston East was under way, the funding and planning of Phase 2 through Dulles Airport continued. This included the adoption of a special taxing district by the Town of Herndon and a public planning forum. Early cost estimates for Phase 2 had been $2.75 billion; however, a group of consultants increased the estimate in 2010 from $3.44 billion to $4.1 billion.

On April 6, 2011, the MWAA Board voted 9 to 4 to build an underground station located 550 feet (170 m) from the airport terminal rather than an above-ground station 1,150 feet (350 m) away from the terminal. The underground station would be more convenient to travelers, but would come at an additional cost of $330 million and would extend the construction time of the project, delaying the expected opening to mid-2017. Republican former Virginia Governor Bob McDonnell opposed the decision to build a more expensive underground station and threatened to withhold support for the project. U.S. Secretary of Transportation Ray LaHood offered to mediate the dispute. On March 7, 2012, the projected $3.8 billion cost for Phase 2 was reduced to $2.7 billion with the elimination of the underground station at Dulles Airport and other cost savings.

The extension of the Silver Line to Dulles and Loudoun County was in jeopardy until July 3, 2012, when the Loudoun County Board of Supervisors voted 5 to 4 to extend the line to Dulles Airport and into the county. On April 25, 2013, the Phase 2 contract was issued at a cost of $1.177 billion. On August 20, 2014, the United States Department of Transportation announced that Phase 2 would be funded with a $1.28 billion Transportation Infrastructure Financial Innovation Act (TIFIA) loan. This delivers part of an approximately $1.87 billion combined commitment of TIFIA loans for Phase 2, which represents the largest TIFIA assistance for a single project in the program's history.

Cracks were discovered in some concrete support girders in July 2015, causing work to be temporarily halted. By July 2016, 30% of the Phase 2 project had been completed. The contractors reported that significant progress was made with regard to the structure of the line. By March 2017, completion of Phase 2 construction had reached 56% with work on the rail yard at Dulles Airport reaching 46%, 76% of deck spans being poured, and all aerial guideway girders over the Dulles Access Road near Saarinen Circle being set in place. MWAA reported that crews would soon begin installation of pedestrian bridges at the five stations under construction in the median of the Dulles Access Road and the Dulles Greenway.

By January 2018, it was reported that 76% of Phase 2 construction was completed. However, a few months later it was discovered that more than 1,700 concrete panels installed in five of the new Metro stations had been defectively manufactured, making them prone to water infiltration. Construction contractors took action to fix the problem and said it would not impact the extension's projected 2020 opening. The contractor Capital Rail Constructors (CRC) and the supplier Universal Concrete pledged to fix the problem, and CRC also committed to spraying the concrete with a special sealant every 10 years as needed. Later, in May 2018, the federal district court in Alexandria, Virginia unsealed allegations by a former employee at Universal Concrete Corporation that precast concrete used in five of the six Phase 2 Silver Line stations had been produced from aggregate from a different quarry than the one specified in construction contracts. Officials took four core samples from each of the five affected stations for microscopic testing to determine whether the panels complied with project requirements. That July, the governments of Virginia and the United States sued Universal Concrete for providing false records and defective materials. In September 2018, it was revealed that about 400 of the concrete rail ties on Phase 2 were defective, in that they caused the rails to bend outward. However, Metro and CRC were not able to agree on a solution before that December.

Despite these controversies, progress of the extension's construction steadily approached completion throughout the rest of the year, reaching 78% in June, 86% in September and 92% by January 2019. A month later, it was deemed that the extension would be ready for testing that would last for several months, starting with two recently retired 5000 series railcars towed by a diesel to clean the third rail while it is disabled, before energizing it to allow for more dynamic train testing. Despite reports of trouble that prevented early test trains from going so far, testing eventually continued throughout the expansion and into Dulles Airport in March. The following month, progress of construction reached 95%.

In June 2019, an updated estimation of Phase 2's completion was made, stating that it could be ready for service at about the third quarter of 2020. In August 2019, MWAA announced that Phase 2 would open around mid July 2020 but WMATA expressed some doubts. Towards the end of the year, after considering the pace of the work being done and efforts to address outstanding issues, Metro officials then announced that the second phase may not be ready for service until about September 2020. During a Metro board meeting in December 2019, officials floated the idea of fully replacing the defective concrete panels provided by the MWAA during construction, instead of just repairing them. Should these plans go through, Phase 2's launch date may be pushed back by another year from September 2020.

By early February 2020, it was reported that construction was 98% complete. However, by the end of March 2020, while determining a budget for the 2020–2021 fiscal year (and having taken the impact of the COVID-19 pandemic into consideration), Metro re-evaluated the timetable for the second phase's launch and anticipated it would be ready for service on April 1, 2021.

From March 26, 2020, until June 28, 2020, trains were bypassing Greensboro, McLean, East Falls Church, Virginia Square–GMU, Clarendon, Federal Triangle, Smithsonian, Federal Center SW, and Morgan Boulevard stations due to the local impact of the coronavirus pandemic in the Washington D.C. area. All stations reopened on June 28, 2020.

On April 23, 2020, WMATA announced that Silver Line service would be suspended beginning on May 23, 2020, in order to rebuild stations west of Ballston–MU and to complete the second phase of the Silver Line. This was in part due to the historically low ridership numbers for the transit agency due to the ongoing COVID-19 pandemic, traffic free highways, and WMATA wanting to get around the clock maintenance done; it would be easier for work to be done without any riders or trains interfering with the workers. They offered local bus service from Wiehle, Greensboro, Spring Hill, Tysons, McLean, and East Falls Church to Ballston. Originally, WMATA planned on reducing Orange and Silver Line trains while continuously single tracking at East Falls Church instead of a full closure. Later that summer, while the Silver Line was closed, work began on integrating Phase 2's computerized control systems with those of the rest of the Metrorail system, a crucial step towards its completion. Phase 2's train control systems were finally integrated with that of the Metrorail system by the end of August and three more days of closures took place in November and December for final dynamic testing. On June 24, 2020, WMATA announced that Silver Line service would resume three weeks early when trains are able to bypass East Falls Church. All Silver Line service resumed on August 16, 2020, when Silver and Orange Line trains were able to bypass East Falls Church. East Falls Church reopened on August 23, 2020.

In September 2020, the Metro Office of Inspector General (OIG) reported that more cracks were discovered in five of the six new stations on the second phase and wants the concrete panels to be replaced before the WMATA Board accepts responsibility and opens the new extension. In light of ongoing issues, as well as budget cuts resulting from declining ridership caused by the COVID-19 pandemic, Metro pushed back the opening of the Phase 2 extension first to July 2021, and on December 15, 2020, to Fall of 2021.

On December 14, 2020, WMATA announced that Blue Line service would be suspended between February 13 to May 23, 2021, in order to rebuild the platforms at both Arlington Cemetery and Addison Road. Silver Line trains would run in place of the Blue Line every 12 minutes during the weekdays and 15 minutes on weekends while bypassing Addison Road. In early 2021, construction completion of Phase 2 reached 99 percent. As of March 2021, Phase 2 was projected to open to passenger service in early 2022.

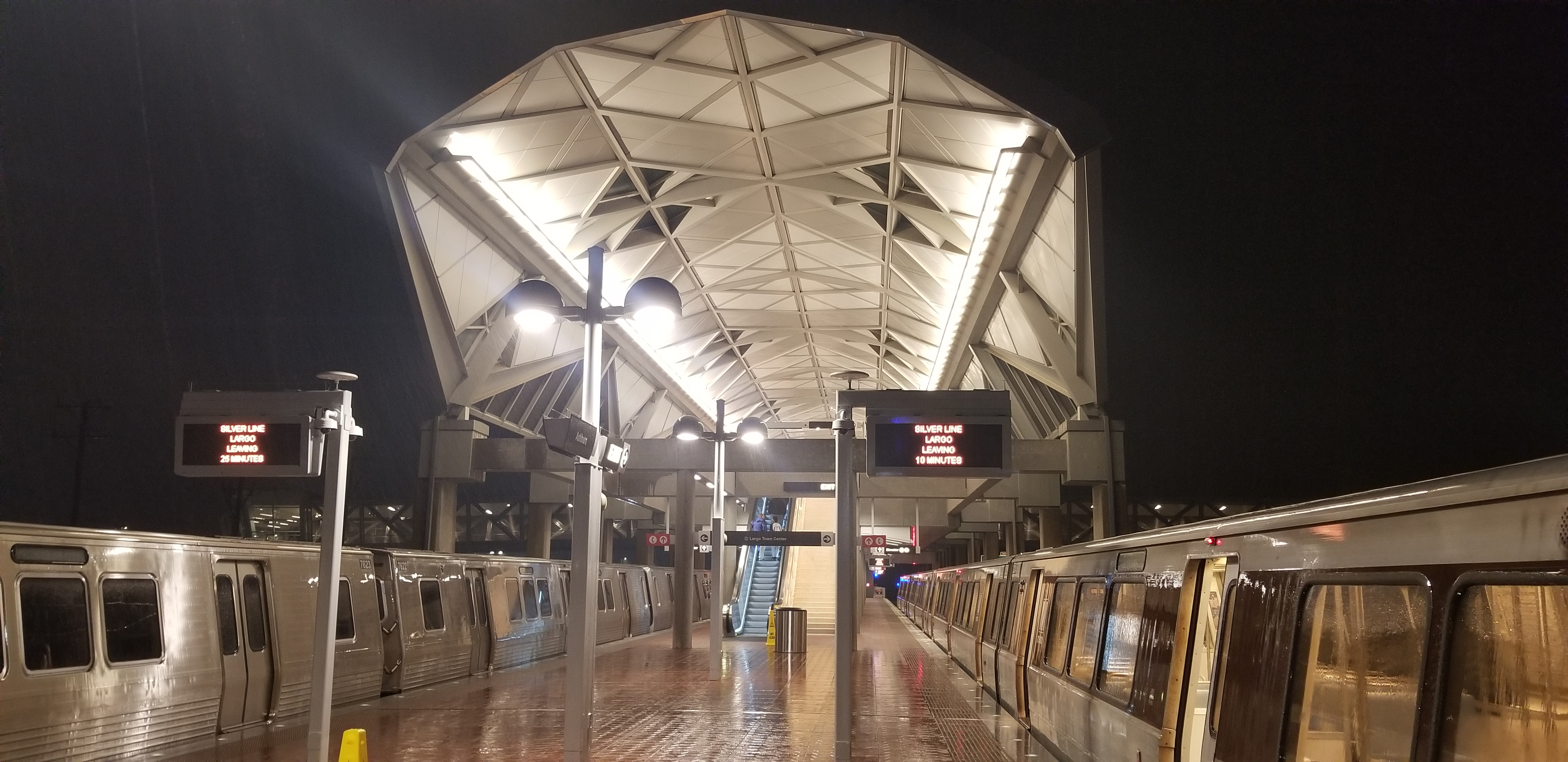
Ashburn on opening day, November 15, 2022

On November 4, 2021, MWAA declared the work on the rail line to be "substantially complete"; however, WMATA estimated that it could take five months of testing and other preparations before passenger service could begin. The expansion took another major step towards completion and opening for service the following month with the completion of the rail yard, followed by initial tests of the full Phase 2 route days later. WMATA took control of the expansion in mid-January and is conducting a final round of testing for several months before it can be opened for service. After all the tie-in procedures were completed, WMATA took control of all remaining work to be done for Phase 2 and conducted a final round of testing before it could be ready for service. In January 2022, the opening was to be ready for service in May 2022 after four months of testing. In early March 2022, Phase 2 was projected to open in July 2022. However, on March 24, 2022, general manager Paul Wiedefeld announced that the projected opening would be delayed once again and declined to give an estimated date of completion.

In June 2022, interim general manager Andy Off announced that WMATA was moving closer to announcing a completion date and expected to take over the Phase 2 project in the next coming weeks. On June 23, 2022, WMATA announced that it had taken over control of the Phase 2 project from the Metropolitan Washington Airports Authority. Final testing of Phase 2 was scheduled to occur throughout early October via the actual running of empty trains throughout its course, and Metro expected all safety certification for this expansion to be completed around the same time before it finally opened for service. On September 22, Metro's board of directors voted unanimously in a meeting to authorize current general manager Randy Clarke to determine the opening date for Phase 2. Simulated service testing began operating along the Phase 2 tracks between October 3 and 17, 2022.

Following these simulated runs, WMATA announced that the extension would likely open before Thanksgiving, with one final impediment towards opening of service being a shortage of available 7000-series trains that could service it after a derailment near the Rosslyn station a year prior put most of them out of service, with plans to restore them hampered by conflicts with the Washington Metrorail Safety Commission.

The extension opened on November 15, 2022, with an opening ceremony held at Dulles International Airport.

=== Later changes ===
On June 3, 2023, service was temporarily suspended between McLean and Ballston-MU stations for track replacement and resumed on June 26, 2023.

Automatic train operation on the Silver Line began in June 2025. ATO on the Washington Metro had ceased following the 2009 Red Line train collision (at which time the Silver Line did not exist), but had gradually been re-introduced to the other lines during late 2024 and early 2025. Half of Silver Line trains have been rerouted from Largo (sharing tracks with the Blue Line) to New Carrollton (sharing tracks with the Orange Line) starting on June 22, 2025. Short turns have been added during weekday peak hours, with trains operating between Wiehle-Reston East and New Carrollton in the morning, and Stadium–Armory and Wiehle-Reston East in the afternoon.

== Route ==
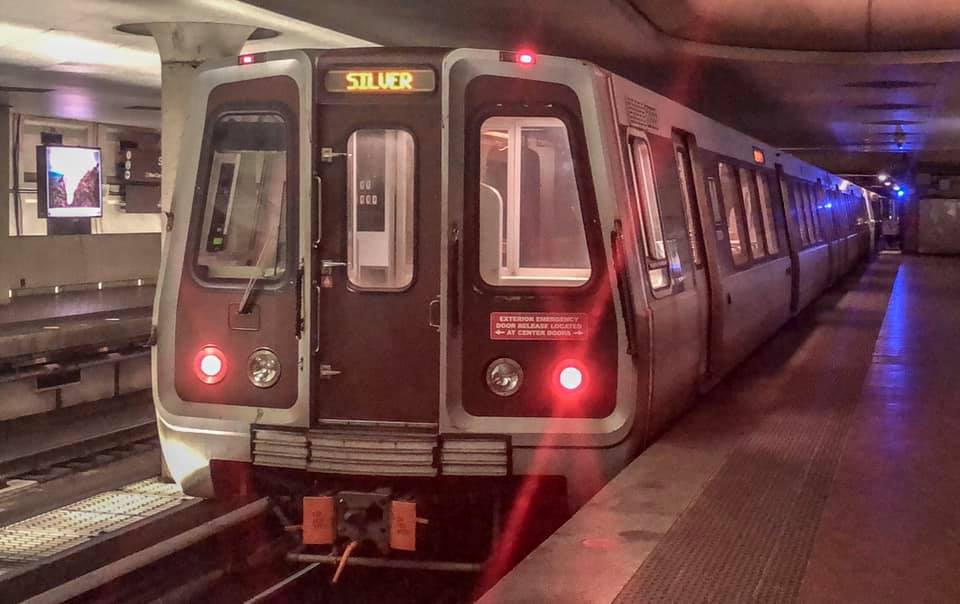
Westbound Silver Line train departing Smithsonian in April 2019

The Silver Line has two primary goals. The first is to link Washington, D.C. by rail to Dulles International Airport and the Northern Virginia edge cities of Tysons, Reston, Herndon, and Ashburn. The second is to spur urban development in Tysons and reduce overall reliance on highway traffic in the business district, Virginia's largest and the 12th-largest in the country. The district's area is comparable in size to downtown Washington, D.C., but is rather insulated from its surrounding neighborhoods and its streets have no existing grid pattern. The Silver Line also improves public access to the Udvar-Hazy Center, an annex of National Air and Space Museum located near Dulles Airport; after the opening of the first phase of the Silver Line, Fairfax Connector began running shuttles to the museum from Wiehle–Reston East.

The pre-existing portions of the Silver Line opened as the Orange and Blue Lines on July 1, 1977, from Stadium–Armory to Rosslyn, on December 11, 1979, from Rosslyn to Ballston, November 22, 1980, from Stadium–Armory to Addison Road, June 7, 1986, from Ballston-MU through East Falls Church and December 18, 2004, from Addison Road to Largo. Unlike all prior segments of the Metrorail system, which were designed and constructed by the Washington Metropolitan Area Transit Authority (WMATA), the Silver Line was designed and constructed by the Metropolitan Washington Airports Authority (MWAA) and is operated by WMATA. The first phase of the project was funded 43% by $900 million of federal funding, 28% by a special tax district on commercial property proximate to the Silver Line route and 28% by a $0.50 toll increase on the Dulles Toll Road (State Route 267, SR 267). Funding for the second phase of the project is shared by Loudoun County, Fairfax County, the Commonwealth of Virginia and the MWAA.

While the Silver Line's eastern terminus was originally planned at Stadium–Armory, the plan was changed in 2012 for the line to instead originate at Largo because Stadium-Armory's pocket track is too short for trains to turn around. Traveling westward through the District of Columbia, the Silver Line shares the Blue and Orange Line tracks. It continues through Arlington along the Orange Line and branches off immediately east of the Orange Line's West Falls Church station. The new tracks run in the median of the Dulles Connector Road (SR 267) to an elevated bridge, which takes them over SR 123. Two elevated stops along the west side of Route 123 serve the national headquarters of Capital One, SAIC and two enclosed Tysons Corner shopping malls. The tracks then enter a tunnel which emerges in the median of SR 7. Two elevated stations above SR 7 serve the western section of Tysons. The elevated track then swings back into the median of the Dulles Access Road and Phase 1 terminated at Wiehle-Reston East.

In Phase 2, the Silver Line continues west in the Dulles Access Road's median until the airport. Along the way, four additional stations were built with platforms in the median of the road and a faregate and pedestrian bridges to parking areas elevated above the highway. In anticipation of the Herndon station being built, Fairfax County constructed a 1,750-space parking garage with ramps to Dulles Access Road's toll lanes in 1999, and this facility was used for bus commuters on an interim basis during Phase 2 construction. The garage drew criticism because of alleged construction flaws. Upon reaching the airport, the track rises up on a viaduct which follows the path of the arrivals driveway of the airport terminal to a station located away from the terminal that is accessible by a pedestrian tunnel. The track leaves the station near the airport hotel and economy parking lots and heads north parallel to the main runways. A storage yard and maintenance facility branches off to the west occupying the airport's buffer zone north of the end of its major runways. The final two stops are in the median of the Dulles Greenway, serving the Ashburn suburb. Hence, the line is expected to draw both airport traffic and commuters from the far western suburbs of Washington. D.C.. Buses previously provided these users with limited public transportation. In contrast, the Silver Line will eventually provide trains once every six minutes during rush hours and once every fourteen minutes during non-rush hours.

== Rolling stock ==
Metro's new 7000-series cars were ordered at a price of $3 million per car,. The Dulles Corridor Metrorail Project required 128 new cars: 64 for Phase 1, and another 64 for Phase 2. Additional cars were ordered to replace aging 1000-series cars and to accommodate ridership growth. The contract was signed on July 2, 2010, for 428 cars.

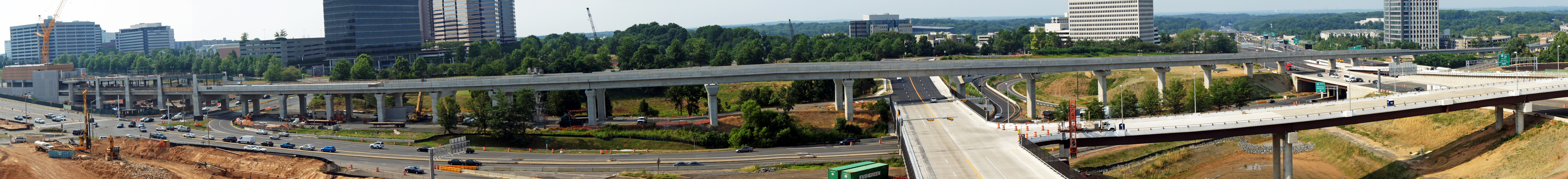
Panoramic view of Silver Line Phase 1 project under construction in July 2012 between the Tysons Corner (now Tysons) station on SR 123 at Tysons Boulevard and the overpass on the Capital Beltway (I-495).

== Stations ==
Stations are listed from west to east.

Station	Code	Opened	Connections
Ashburn	N12	November 15, 2022	
Loudoun Gateway	N11	November 15, 2022	
Dulles International Airport	N10	November 15, 2022	Washington Dulles International Airport
Innovation Center	N09	November 15, 2022	
Herndon	N08	November 15, 2022	
Reston Town Center	N07	November 15, 2022	
Wiehle–Reston East	N06	July 26, 2014	
Spring Hill	N04	July 26, 2014	
Greensboro	N03	July 26, 2014	
Tysons (Note: Originally opened as Tysons Corner. Changed in 2022)	N02	July 26, 2014	
McLean	N01	July 26, 2014	
East Falls Church	K05	June 7, 1986	Orange Line
Ballston–MU	K04	December 11, 1979	Orange Line
Virginia Square–GMU	K03	December 11, 1979	Orange Line
Clarendon	K02	December 11, 1979	Orange Line
Court House	K01	December 11, 1979	Orange Line
Rosslyn	C05	July 1, 1977	Orange Line; Blue Line
Foggy Bottom–GWU	C04	July 1, 1977	Orange Line; Blue Line
Farragut West	C03	July 1, 1977	Orange Line; Blue Line; Red Line (at Farragut North)
McPherson Square	C02	July 1, 1977	Orange Line; Blue Line
Metro Center	C01	March 29, 1976	Red Line; Orange Line; Blue Line
Federal Triangle	D01	July 1, 1977	Orange Line; Blue Line
Smithsonian	D02	July 1, 1977	Orange Line; Blue Line
L'Enfant Plaza	D03	July 1, 1977	Yellow Line; Green Line; Orange Line; Blue Line; Virginia Railway Express (at L'Enfant)
Federal Center SW	D04	July 1, 1977	Orange Line; Blue Line
Capitol South	D05	July 1, 1977	Orange Line; Blue Line
Eastern Market	D06	July 1, 1977	Orange Line; Blue Line
Potomac Avenue	D07	July 1, 1977	Orange Line; Blue Line
Stadium–Armory	D08	July 1, 1977	Orange Line; Blue Line
New Carrollton Branch
Minnesota Avenue	D09	November 20, 1978	Orange Line
Deanwood	D10	November 20, 1978	Orange Line
Cheverly	D11	November 20, 1978	Orange Line
Landover	D12	November 20, 1978	Orange Line
New Carrollton	D13	November 20, 1978	Orange Line; Amtrak: Northeast Regional, Palmetto, Vermonter; MARC: ■ Penn Line; MTA Purple Line (under construction)
Largo Branch
Benning Road	G01	November 22, 1980	Blue Line
Capitol Heights	G02	November 22, 1980	Blue Line
Addison Road	G03	November 22, 1980	Blue Line
Morgan Boulevard	G04	December 18, 2004	Blue Line
Downtown Largo (Note: Originally opened as Largo Town Center. Changed in 2022)	G05	December 18, 2004	Blue Line

== Future ==
A Wolf Trap station was considered as part of Phase 1 between Spring Hill and Wiehle-Reston East, but that station was excluded from the project due to cost effectiveness concerns.

A study published in 2013 overseeing a long-term plan for the system subsequent to the Phase 2 extension plans to Ashburn included a possible three-station extension of the Silver Line northwest to Leesburg, which is the seat of Loudoun County. The stations from northwest to southeast are VA 7 Bypass, Crosstrail Blvd and Belmont Ridge. The same study included either adding an infill station between Tysons Corner (now Tysons) and McLean, or renaming the former, to allow transfer with a loop line that would parallel the Capital Beltway, named the "Beltway Line". This station would be named Beltway and 123.

In December 2019, WMATA began to study changes to the Orange, Blue, and Silver lines to relieve congestion at Rosslyn. Each proposed option would involve the construction of a new Rosslyn II station that would be connected to the existing Rosslyn station, allowing one of the three lines to be separated from the other two lines, increasing capacity of the station. Two of the options proposed would involve that line being the Silver Line. In one option, from west to east, the Silver Line would run express from West Falls Church to the Rosslyn II station, with a single intermediate stop at a new Ballston II station. Then, the Silver Line would run along new tracks to a new station at Georgetown, followed by several new stations under M Street NW to Union Station. The Silver Line would then travel north-east to new stations in Ivy City, Port Towns, Hyattsville, and finally to new College Park II and Greenbelt II stations. In the second option, from west to east, the Silver Line would remain unchanged in Virginia until reaching the Rosslyn II station, after which point it would travel along new tracks to Georgetown, followed by several new stations under M Street NW to Union Station. Then, the Silver Line would travel north-east through Ivy City, Port Towns, Landover Hills, and finally intersect the Orange Line at New Carrollton.
