= Spring Hill station =

Washington Metro station in Virginia, US

Spring Hill
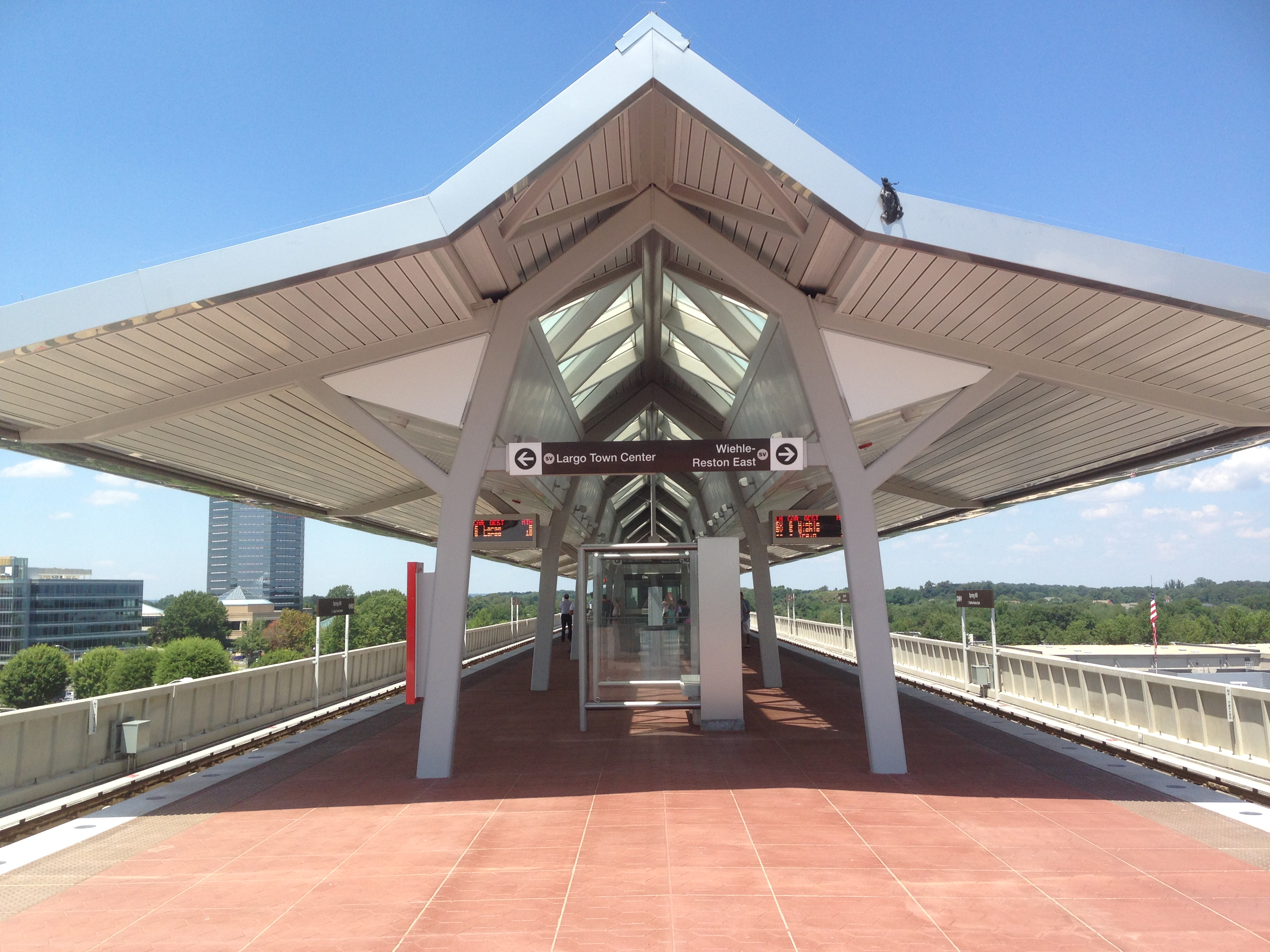
- Platform of Spring Hill station on opening day, July 26, 2014

General information
- Location: 1576 Spring Hill Road; Tysons, Virginia
- Coordinates: 38°55′45″N 77°14′31″W
- Owner: WMATA
- Platforms: 1 island platform
- Tracks: 2
- Connections: Fairfax Connector: 427, 432, 574

Construction
- Structure type: Elevated
- Cycle facilities: Capital Bikeshare, 20 lockers and 22 bike racks

Other information
- Station code: N04

History
- Opened: July 26, 2014; 12 years ago

Passengers
- 2025: 831 (average weekday)
- Rank: 96 of 98

Services
Preceding station	Washington Metro	Following station
Wiehle–Reston East toward Ashburn	Silver Line	Greensboro toward Downtown Largo or New Carrollton
Route map
Location

Spring Hill station (preliminary names Tysons West, Tysons–Spring Hill Road) is a Washington Metro station in Fairfax County, Virginia, United States, on the Silver Line. Located in Tysons, it began operation on July 26, 2014. The station is located in the central median of Leesburg Pike (SR 7) just west of Spring Hill Road.

There had been some controversy about whether to build the rail through Tysons below ground or on elevated tracks. The efforts to build a tunnel through all of Tysons failed, and the current design has the main platform with a height of 48 ft (15 m) at its east end and 51 ft (16 m) at its west end.

The station is about 5.8 miles (9.3 km) from Wiehle–Reston East, the next station to the west, but only about 0.8 miles (1.3 km) from Greensboro directly to the southeast.

Spring Hill is the least used DC Metro station in Fairfax County at 609 entries per weekday in 2023.

== Station facilities ==
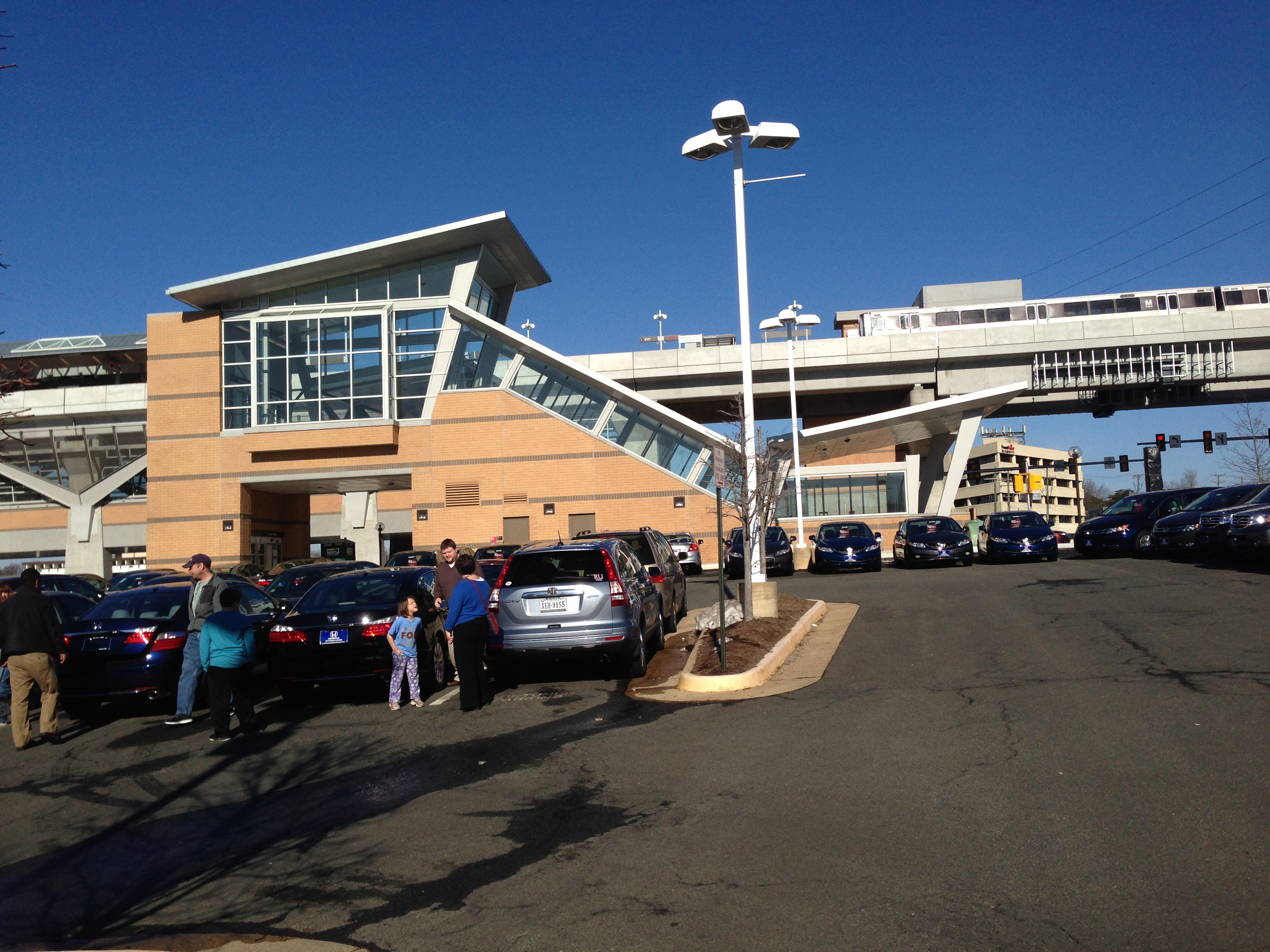
Exterior of Spring Hill station from the south side in February 2014

- 2 station entrances (each side of SR 7)

== History ==
From May 23 until August 15, 2020, this station was closed due to the Platform Reconstruction west of Ballston–MU and the Silver Line Phase II tie construction. This station reopened beginning on August 16, 2020, when trains were able to bypass East Falls Church station.
