= Wiehle–Reston East station =

Washington Metro station in Virginia, US

Wiehle–Reston East
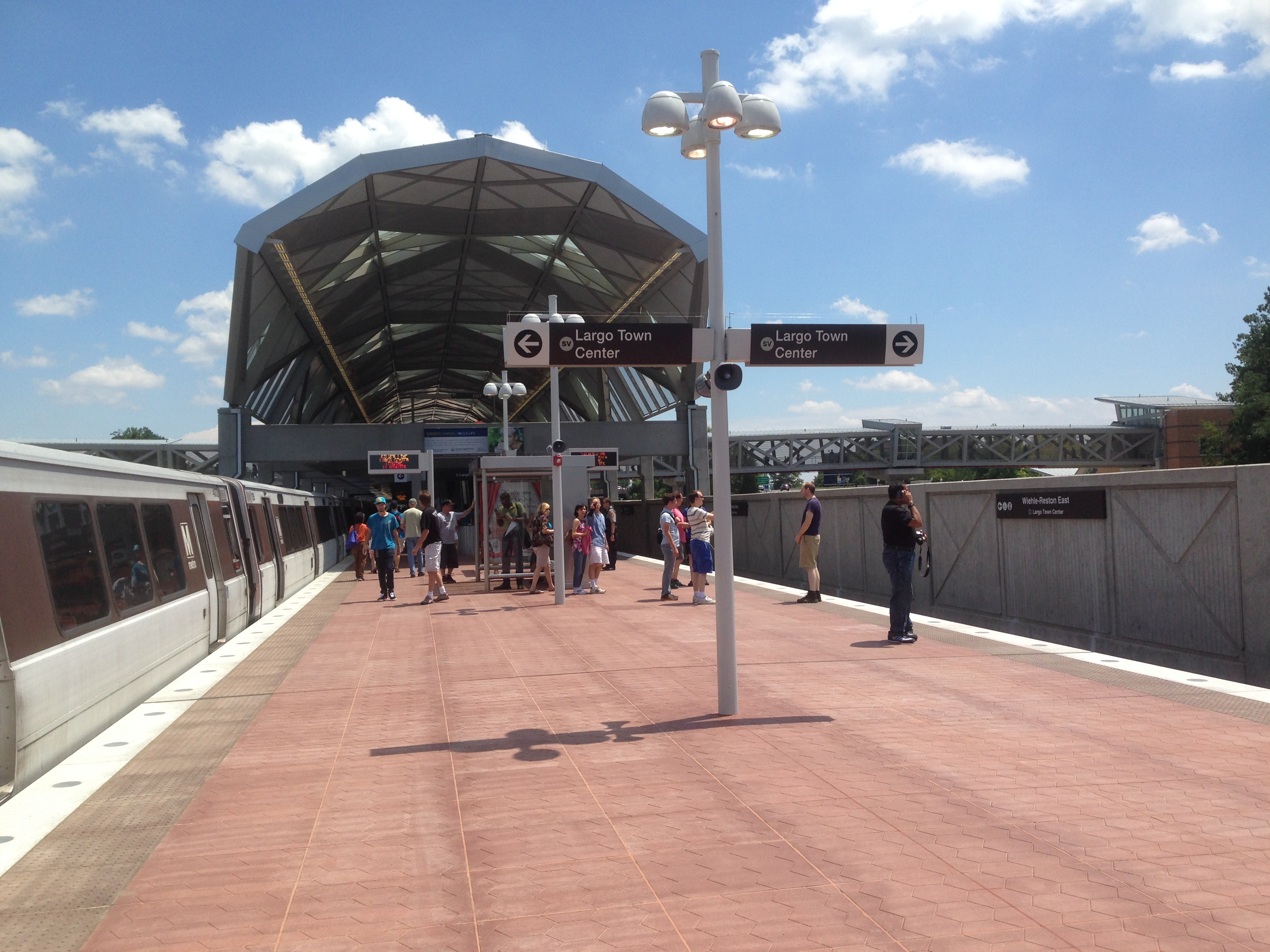
- Wiehle–Reston East station on the first day of service, July 26, 2014

General information
- Location: 1862 Wiehle Avenue; Reston, Virginia, U.S.
- Coordinates: 38°56′52″N 77°20′25″W
- Owner: WMATA
- Platforms: 1 island platform
- Tracks: 2
- Connections: Fairfax Connector: 507, 557, 558, 951, 952, RIBS 1, RIBS 2, RIBS 3; Washington & Old Dominion Trail

Construction
- Structure type: At-grade
- Parking: 2,300 spaces
- Cycle facilities: Capital Bikeshare, racks, lockers, secure storage room
- Accessible: yes

Other information
- Station code: N06

History
- Opened: July 26, 2014; 12 years ago

Passengers
- 2025: 1,979 (average weekday)
- Rank: 77 of 98

Services
Preceding station	Washington Metro	Following station
Reston Town Center toward Ashburn	Silver Line	Spring Hill toward Downtown Largo or New Carrollton
Route map
Location

Wiehle–Reston East station (/ˈwiːli/; preliminary names Wiehle Avenue, Reston–Wiehle Avenue) is a Washington Metro station in Fairfax County, Virginia, United States, on the Silver Line. Located in Reston, the station is situated alongside Reston Station, a mixed-use urban center. Upon its opening, Wiehle–Reston East was the western terminus of the Silver Line with a pocket track just beyond the station for reversing trains until November 15, 2022, when service was extended to the new westernmost terminus at Ashburn.

== Station design ==
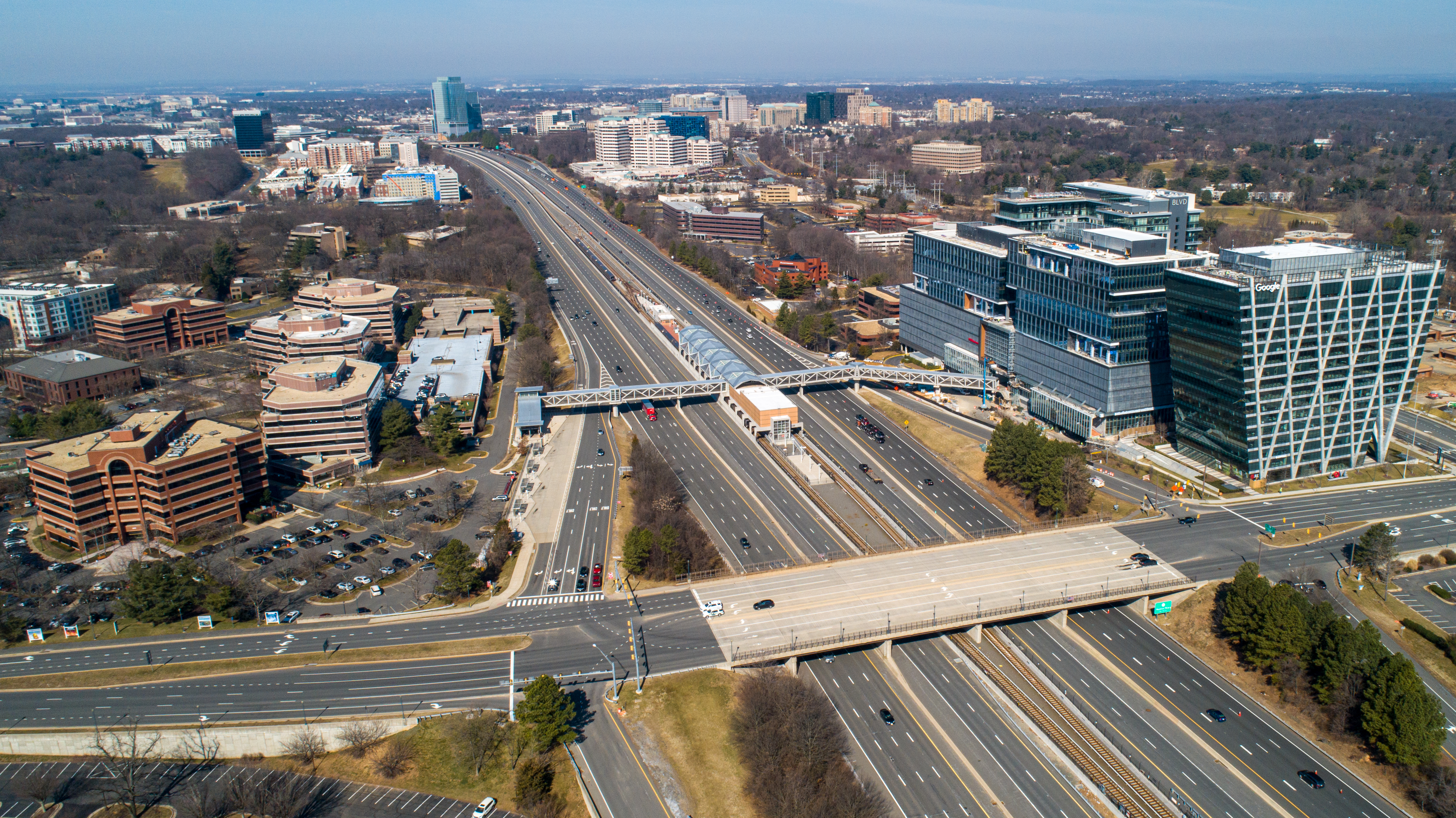
Surrounding developments around the station in May 2021

The station is located within the median of Virginia State Route 267, similar to the Orange Line, which travels within the median of Interstate 66 west of Ballston–MU station, which is about 5.8 miles (9.3 km) from Spring Hill, the next station to the east. It has approximately 2,300 parking spaces to the north of the road. Its main platform has a height of 5 ft (1.5 m) at its east end and 6.5 ft (2.0 m) at its west end.

The station was the staging point for the Metropolitan Washington Airports Authority's Silver Line Express Bus, which traveled in about 15 minutes between the station and Washington Dulles International Airport every 15 to 20 minutes with a fare of $5.00 until the opening of Phase 2 of the Silver Line. The paved Washington & Old Dominion Railroad Trail (W&OD Trail) crosses Wiehle Avenue (Virginia State Route 828) 0.3 miles (0.5 km) northeast of the station.

== History ==
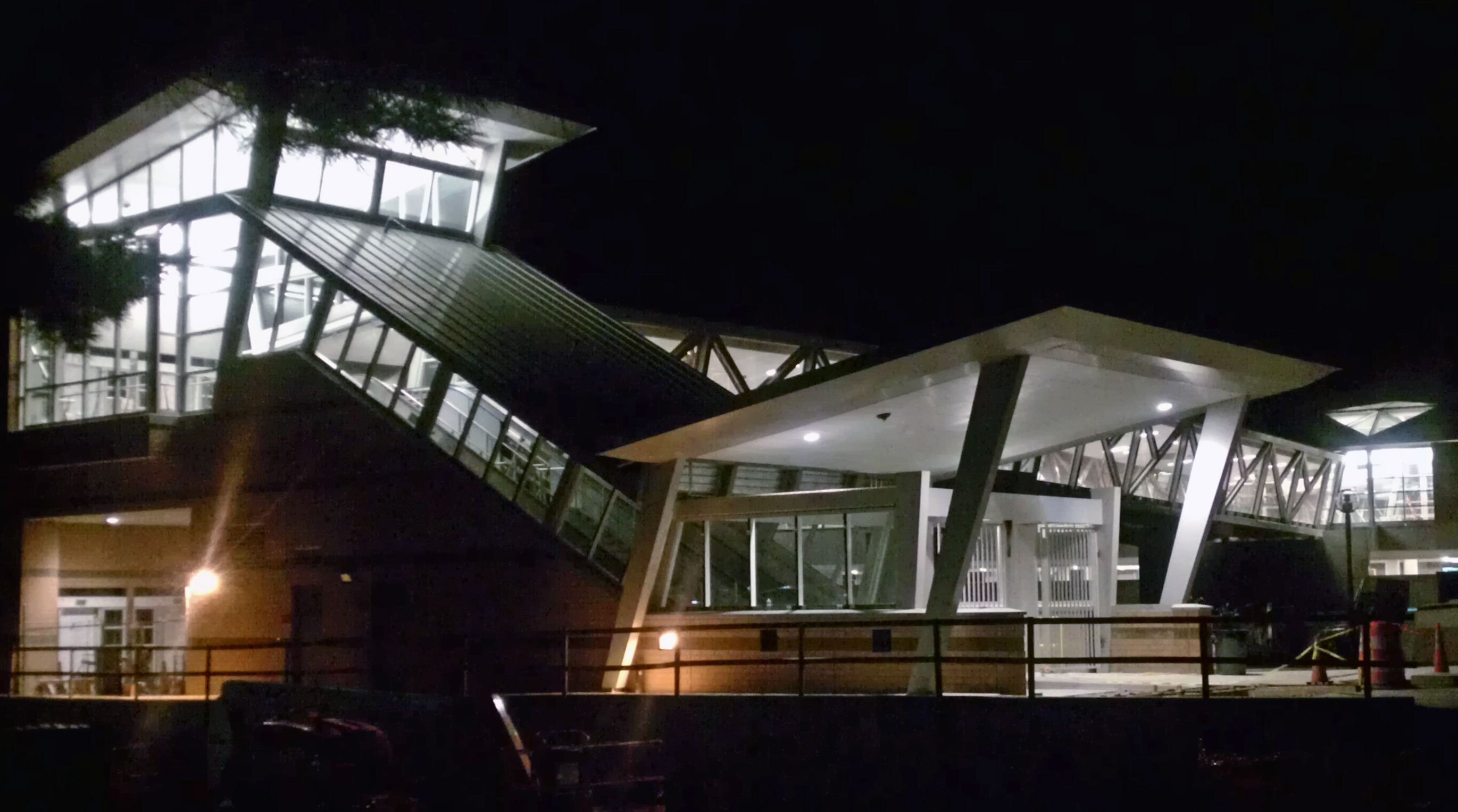
The station under construction in July 2013

The "Wiehle" in the station's name refers to Wiehle Avenue at the eastern end of the station, which itself is named after a small town, Wiehle's Station, built in 1892 that used to be located nearby.

In order to foster high density development within walking distance of the station, Fairfax County awarded development rights to an existing 9 acres (3.6 ha) park-and-ride lot on the station site. Reston-based Comstock Partners constructed a 2,300 space below-ground parking structure, and is developing 1.5 million square feet (140,000 m^{2}) of commercial and residential space, which when completed will consist of more than 500,000 square feet (46,000 m^{2}) of Class A office space, approximately 100,000 square feet (9,300 m^{2}) of restaurants, shops, and service-oriented retailers, a 200-plus room hotel, and approximately 900 luxury residences.

From May 23 until August 15, 2020, this station was closed due to the Platform Reconstruction west of Ballston–MU station and the Silver Line Phase II tie construction. This station reopened beginning on August 16, 2020 when trains were able to bypass East Falls Church station.

On October 31, 2022, WMATA announced that the Phase 2 extension would open on November 15, 2022, extending Silver Line trains to Ashburn station. The extension opened on time with an opening ceremony.
