= Foggy Bottom–GWU station =

Metro rail station in Washington, D.C.

Foggy Bottom–GWU Kennedy Center
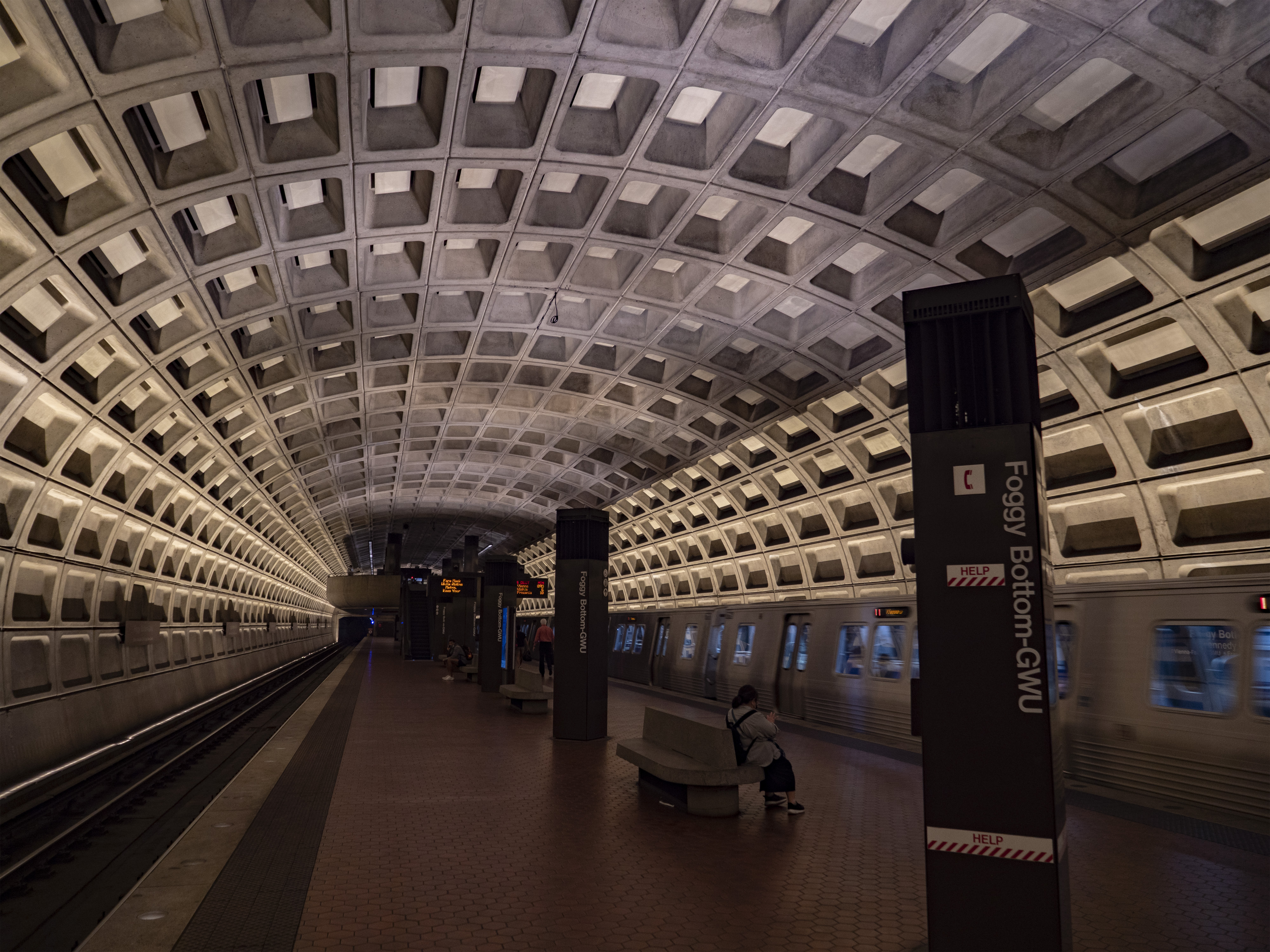
- Platform of the Foggy Bottom-GWU station view in August 2021 with a Vienna-bound Orange Line train departing

General information
- Location: 890 23rd St NW; Washington, D.C., U.S.
- Coordinates: 38°54′03″N 77°03′02″W
- Owner: WMATA
- Platforms: 1 island platform
- Tracks: 2
- Connections: Metrobus: A58, C85, D10, D20, D74, D80, D82; MTA Maryland Bus: 901, 909, 950; Kennedy Center Shuttle

Construction
- Structure type: Underground
- Cycle facilities: Capital Bikeshare, 10 racks and 20 lockers
- Accessible: Yes

Other information
- Station code: C04

History
- Opened: July 1, 1977; 49 years ago

Passengers
- 2025: 15,761 (average weekday)
- Rank: 3 of 98

Services
Preceding station	Washington Metro	Following station
Rosslyn toward Vienna	Orange Line	Farragut West toward New Carrollton
Rosslyn toward Ashburn	Silver Line	Farragut West toward Downtown Largo or New Carrollton
Rosslyn toward Franconia–Springfield	Blue Line	Farragut West toward Downtown Largo
Route map
Location

Foggy Bottom–GWU station is a Washington Metro station in the Foggy Bottom neighborhood of Washington, D.C., United States. The island-platformed station was opened on July 1, 1977, and is operated by the Washington Metropolitan Area Transit Authority (WMATA). Providing service for the Blue, Orange, and Silver Lines, the station is located at the intersection of 23rd & I Streets on the George Washington University (GWU) campus. It is the last westbound station in the District of Columbia on these lines before they dive under the Potomac River to Virginia.

== History ==
The station opened on July 1, 1977. Its opening coincided with the completion of 11.8 miles (19.0 km) of rail between National Airport and RFK Stadium and the opening of the Arlington Cemetery, Capitol South, Crystal City, Eastern Market, Federal Center SW, Federal Triangle, L'Enfant Plaza, McPherson Square, National Airport, Pentagon, Pentagon City, Potomac Avenue, Rosslyn, Smithsonian and Stadium–Armory stations. Orange Line service to the station began upon the line's opening on November 20, 1978.

== Station layout ==
Foggy Bottom–GWU uses a simple island platform layout: one platform with a track on each side. Track C1 carries eastbound trains to New Carrollton and Largo whilst track C2 is used by westbound trains to Vienna, Franconia–Springfield, and Ashburn. As with all stations on the Metro, there are platform edge lights to warn passengers of incoming trains.

In 2008, WMATA installed red-colored LED lights at Foggy Bottom–GWU and other busy stations after a successful pilot at Gallery Place. There is a 22 coffer "waffle vault" ceiling at Foggy Bottom–GWU as it was one of the first stations to be built in the system; later underground stations abandoned this design for a simpler concrete arch.

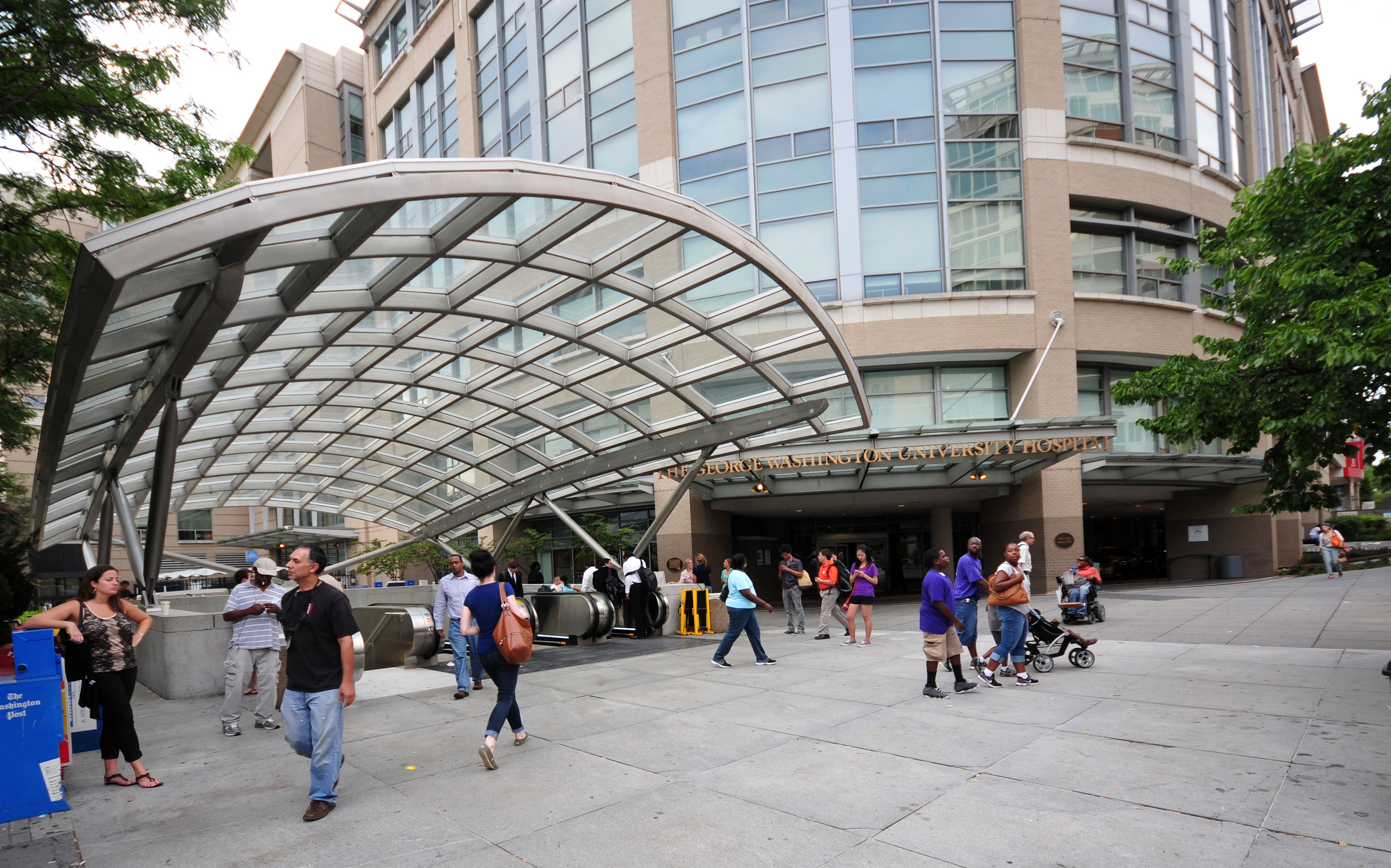
Station entrance at I and 23rd Streets in July 2012

There is a single mezzanine located at the center of the platform. Escalators from here allow passengers to descend to platform level or to the sole entrance and exit of the station at the northwestern corner of I and 23rd Streets. A total of two elevators and six escalators (three between the street and mezzanine and three between the mezzanine and platform) are currently in use at the station.

In 2007, WMATA released a report detailing the potential to add a second entrance to the east side of the platform, serving the intersection of 22nd and I streets. No further action has been taken to construct this entrance, through the land proposed to host the surface aspect remains unbuilt upon.

== Location ==
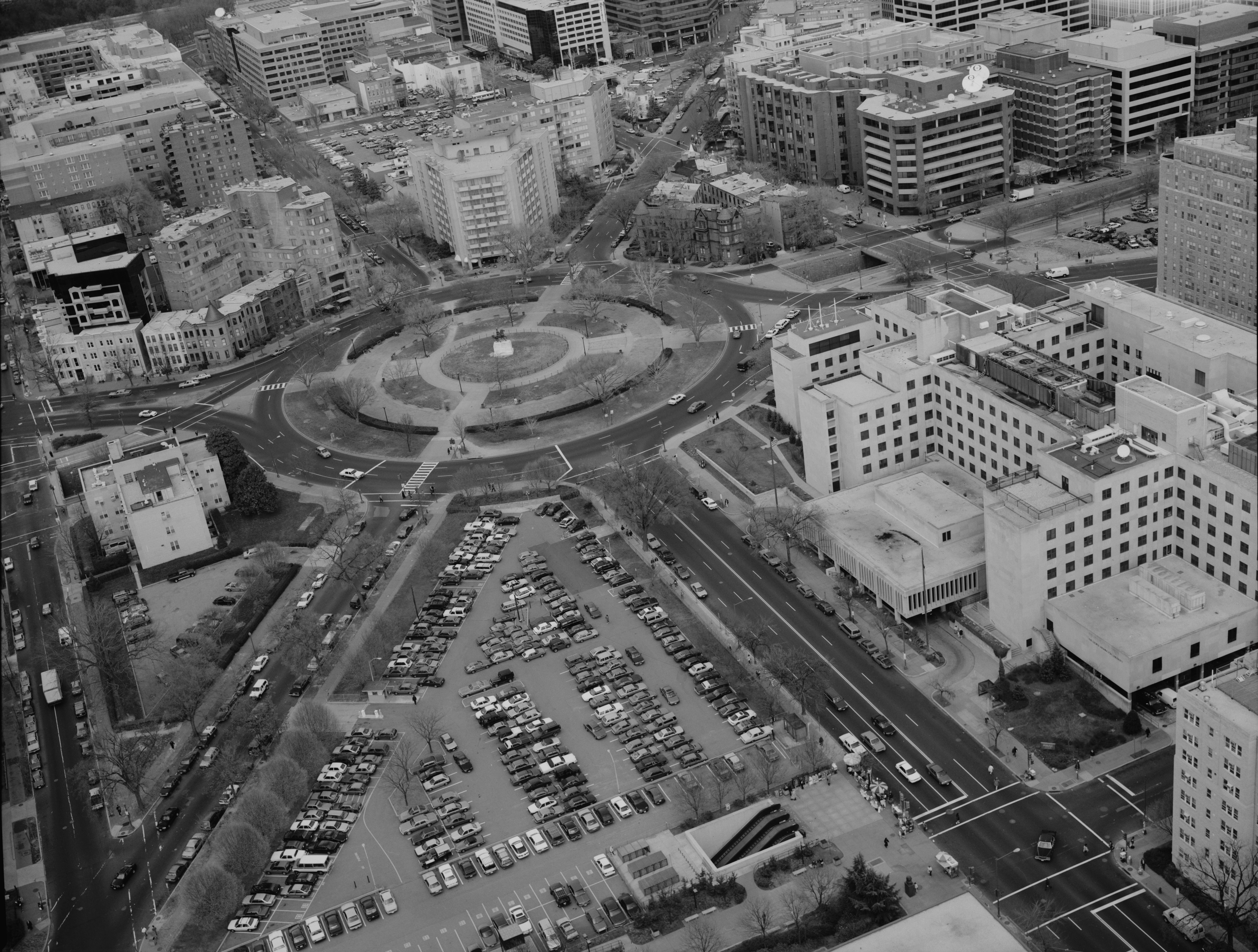
Aerial view of Washington Circle, with station entrance at bottom right, 1992

Foggy Bottom–GWU serves the neighborhood of Foggy Bottom and the campus of George Washington University. It is also the nearest station to the Georgetown neighborhood. The station is located at 23rd and I streets in Northwest, just south of Washington Circle, and at the front entrance to the George Washington University Hospital.

Service began on July 1, 1977. The World Bank is located one block south and eight blocks east at Pennsylvania Avenue and 18th Street and the Watergate complex is slightly more than .75 miles (1.2 km) southwest of the station. Slightly south of The Watergate is the John F. Kennedy Center for the Performing Arts.

== Notable places nearby ==
- George Washington University Hospital
- Golden Triangle
- School Without Walls
- Harry S Truman Building (United States Department of State)
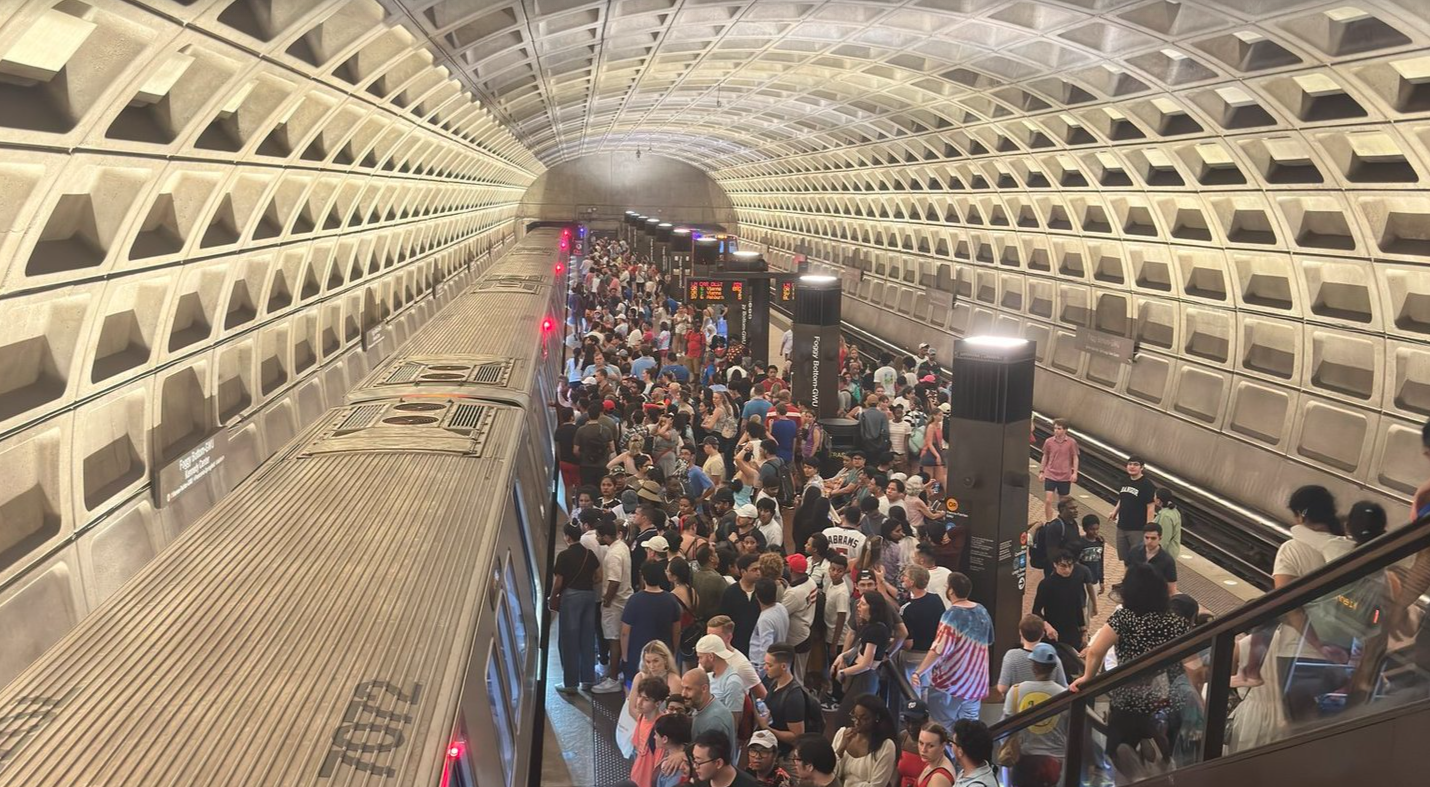
  A crowded Foggy Bottom after the July 4th festivities in 2024 with a Vienna-bound Orange Line train servicing the station.
- United States Institute of Peace
- Lincoln Memorial
- Georgetown
- Downtown
- Washington Circle
- West End
- George Washington University
- Kennedy Center
