= Farragut West station =

Metro rail station in Washington, D.C.

Farragut West
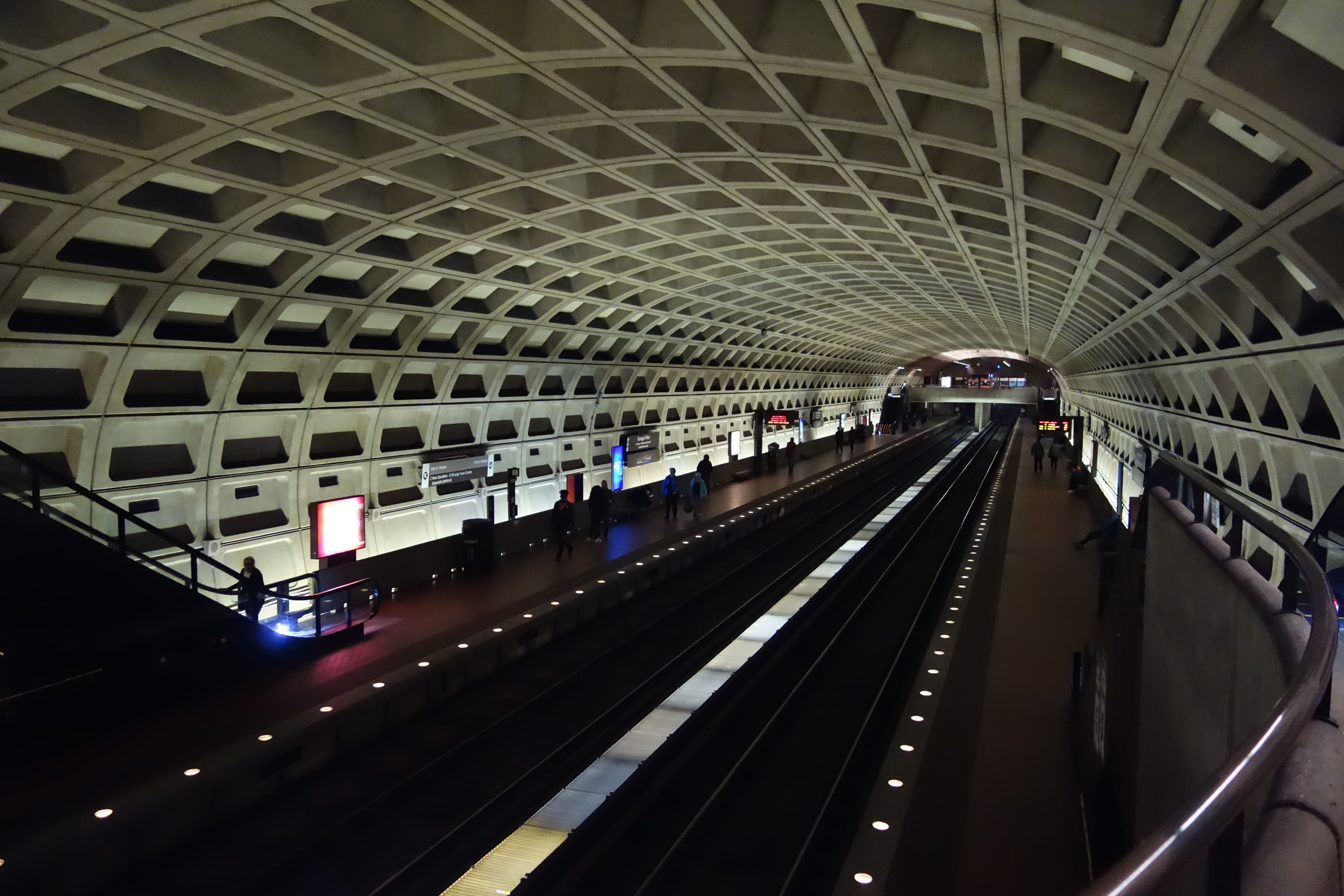
- Farragut West platforms facing East in April 2018

General information
- Location: 900 18th Street NW; Washington, D.C.
- Coordinates: 38°54′05″N 77°02′22″W
- Owner: Washington Metropolitan Area Transit Authority
- Platforms: 2 side platforms
- Tracks: 2
- Connections: at Farragut North; Metrobus: A49, A58, D10, D20, D70, D72, D80, D94, F19; MTA Maryland Bus: 901, 902, 904, 905, 909, 950, 995; Loudoun County Transit; PRTC OmniRide

Construction
- Structure type: Underground
- Cycle facilities: Capital Bikeshare, 4 racks
- Accessible: Yes

Other information
- Station code: C03

History
- Opened: July 1, 1977; 49 years ago

Passengers
- 2025: 12,028 (average weekday)
- Rank: 8 of 98

Services
Preceding station	Washington Metro	Following station
Foggy Bottom–GWU toward Vienna	Orange Line	McPherson Square toward New Carrollton
Foggy Bottom–GWU toward Ashburn	Silver Line	McPherson Square toward Downtown Largo or New Carrollton
Foggy Bottom–GWU toward Franconia–Springfield	Blue Line	McPherson Square toward Downtown Largo
Route map
Location

Farragut West station is a Washington Metro station in Downtown Washington, D.C., United States. The side-platformed station was opened on July 1, 1977, and is operated by the Washington Metropolitan Area Transit Authority (WMATA). Providing service for the Blue, Orange and Silver Lines, the station is located just west of Farragut Square with two entrances on I Street at 17th and 18th Streets NW.

While it is only a block away (across the square) from Farragut North on the Red Line, there is no direct connection between the two stations. WMATA originally planned to have a single Farragut station that would serve as an alternate transfer station to ease congestion that would develop in Metro Center. However, it would have been constructed using the cut and cover method, disrupting the square above. Therefore, this proposal was not favored and the two separate stations were built instead. As part of its long-term capital improvement plan dated September 12, 2002, Metro has proposed building an underground pedestrian tunnel connecting this station with Farragut North. On October 28, 2011, Metro announced its Farragut Crossing program, allowing riders using a SmarTrip card up to 30 minutes to transfer for free by foot between Farragut West and Farragut North stations.

== History ==
The station opened on July 1, 1977. Its opening coincided with the completion of 11.8 miles (19.0 km) of rail between National Airport and RFK Stadium and the opening of the Arlington Cemetery, Capitol South, Crystal City, Eastern Market, Federal Center SW, Federal Triangle, Foggy Bottom–GWU, L'Enfant Plaza, McPherson Square, National Airport, Pentagon, Pentagon City, Potomac Avenue, Rosslyn, Smithsonian, and Stadium–Armory stations. This was the first station in the system to open without any pylons along the platform. Information which would be normally found on pylons is located on wall plaques. Orange Line service to the station began when the line opened on November 20, 1978. It was the system's eighth-busiest station in 2023.

At 12:48 AM on October 7, 2019, two out-of-service trains, both consisting of 3000-series rail cars, collided between Foggy Bottom and Farragut West as both trains were going towards the New Carrollton rail yard, affecting the Blue, Orange, and Silver Lines all day the following day. Two drivers were injured due to the collision.

Between January 15 to January 21, 2021, this station was closed because of security concerns due to the Inauguration of Joe Biden.

On November 26, 2025, two members of the West Virginia National Guard were shot outside of the station. One of the members died as a result.

== Notable places nearby ==
- American Legion Headquarters
- Center for Strategic and International Studies
- DAR Constitution Hall
- Farragut Square
- Federal Deposit Insurance Corporation
- International Monetary Fund
- Mayflower Hotel
- National Geographic Society Headquarters
- The Octagon House (American Institute of Architects)
- Organization of American States/Art Museum of the Americas
- The White House
- World Bank
