= Smithsonian station =

Washington Metro station

Coordinates: 38°53′20.7″N 77°1′42.2″W

Smithsonian National Mall
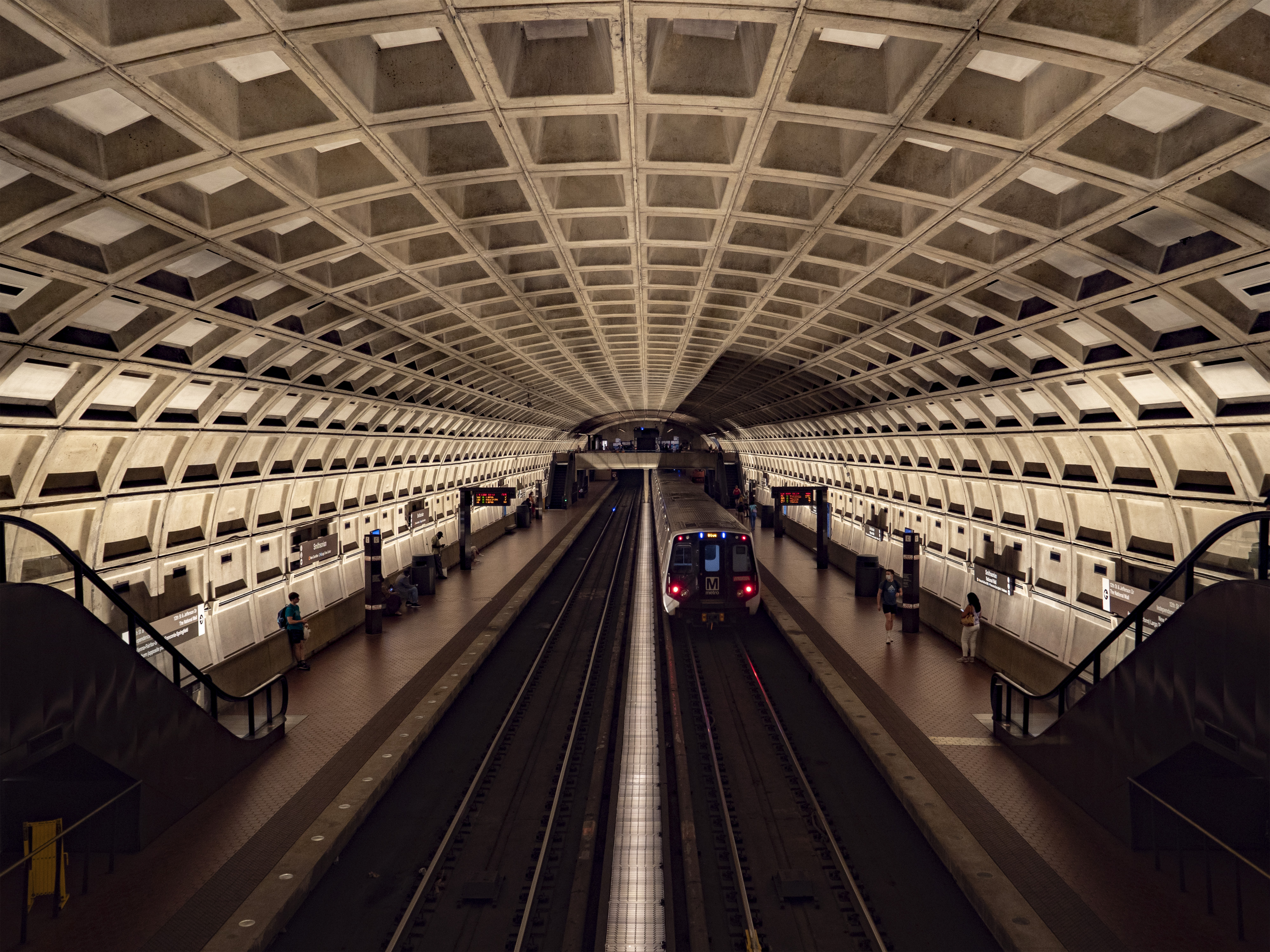
- View from mezzanine in August 2021

General information
- Location: 1200 Independence Avenue SW; Washington, D.C., U.S.
- Owner: Washington Metropolitan Area Transit Authority
- Platforms: 2 side platforms
- Tracks: 2
- Connections: Metrobus: D50; Loudoun County Transit; PRTC OmniRide

Construction
- Structure type: Underground
- Cycle facilities: Capital Bikeshare, 2 racks
- Accessible: Yes

Other information
- Station code: D02

History
- Opened: July 1, 1977; 49 years ago

Passengers
- 2025: 5,983 (average weekday)
- Rank: 21 of 98

Services
Preceding station	Washington Metro	Following station
Federal Triangle toward Vienna	Orange Line	L'Enfant Plaza toward New Carrollton
Federal Triangle toward Ashburn	Silver Line	L'Enfant Plaza toward Downtown Largo or New Carrollton
Federal Triangle toward Franconia–Springfield	Blue Line	L'Enfant Plaza toward Downtown Largo
Route map
Location

Smithsonian station is a Washington Metro station at the National Mall in Washington, D.C., United States. The side platformed station was opened on July 1, 1977, and is operated by the Washington Metropolitan Area Transit Authority (WMATA). It is a stop on the Blue, Orange and Silver Lines. The station's south entrance is at the southwest corner of Independence Avenue and 12th Street, Southwest, the street elevator is at the northwest corner of the same intersection, and the north entrance is on the south side of the Mall near Jefferson Drive, Southwest.

The station is named for its proximity to the Smithsonian Institution's museums and is close to the Washington Monument, the Tidal Basin and other tourist attractions on and near the National Mall. The station is also near several federal office buildings, including those of the Department of Agriculture and the Department of Energy.

== History ==
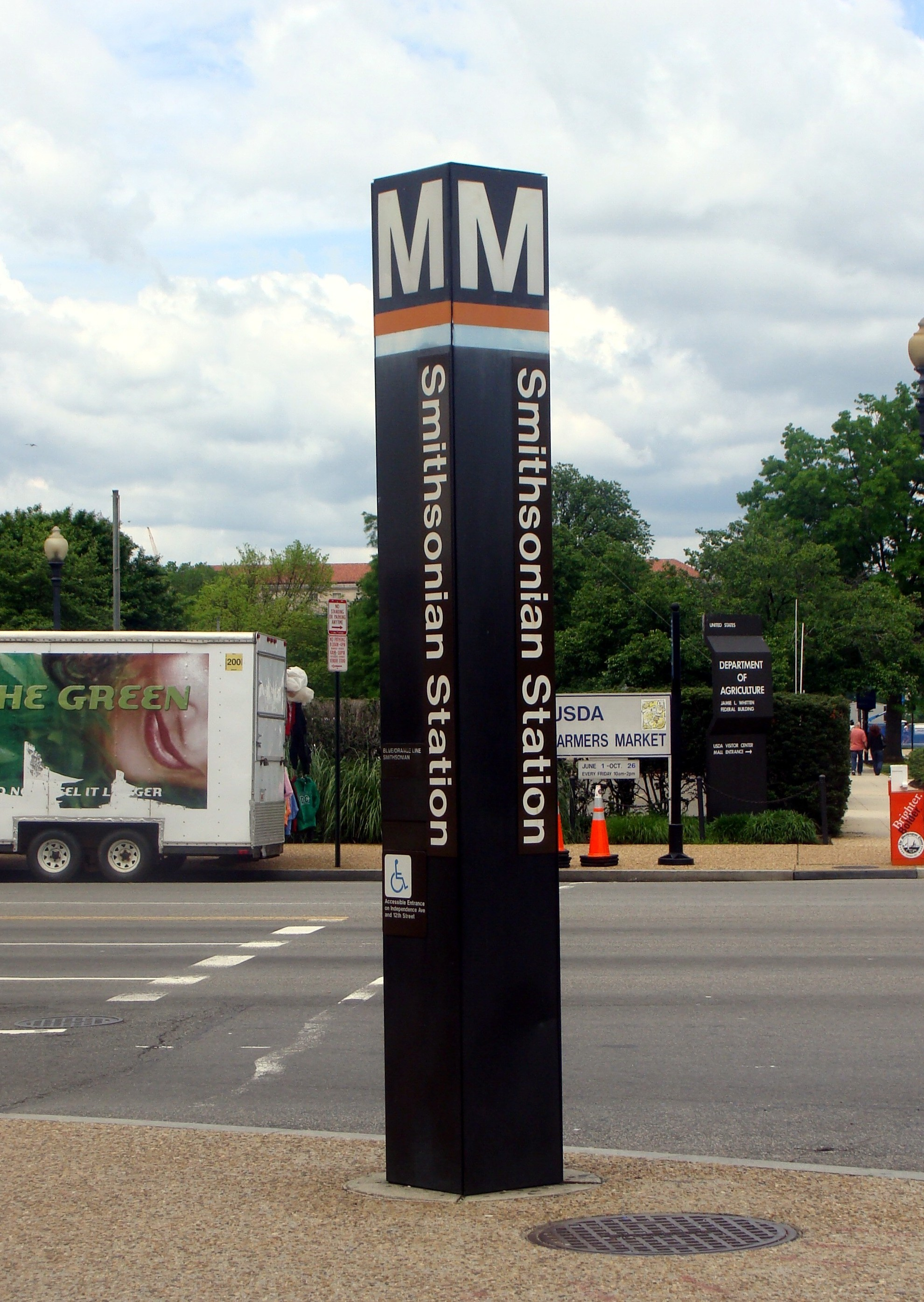

In initial planning for the Metro system, the Smithsonian station was to be called Independence Avenue, since only the entrance at Independence Avenue SW at 12th Street SW was planned. It was renamed to Smithsonian in 1971.

Both the National Park Service (which oversees the National Mall) and Smithsonian wanted Metro to add an entrance on the National Mall in order to serve tourists and reduce car traffic. But Metro refused to add the entrance unless one of those parties, or someone else, contributed the estimated $3 million it would cost. The Park Service went as far as to deny Metro a permit to build its tunnel across the Mall in order to pressure the system to fund the Mall entrance. The White House later ordered the Park Service to grant the permit and Metro to plan for the Mall entrance.

The station opened on July 1, 1977. Its opening coincided with the completion of 11.8 miles (19.0 km) of rail between National Airport and RFK Stadium and the opening of the Arlington Cemetery, Capitol South, Crystal City, Eastern Market, Farragut West, Federal Center SW, Federal Triangle, Foggy Bottom–GWU, L'Enfant Plaza, McPherson Square, National Airport, Pentagon, Pentagon City, Potomac Avenue, Rosslyn, and Stadium–Armory stations. Orange Line service to the station began upon the line's opening on November 20, 1978. Silver Line service at Smithsonian station began on July 26, 2014.

Near this station, Metro had its first fatalities, which occurred on January 13, 1982, when a train derailed. On the same day, Air Florida Flight 90 crashed into the 14th Street Bridge. The two events closed the federal government in the Washington Metropolitan Area.

The Smithsonian station was closed all day on the Fourth of July from 2002 to 2008, as its north entrance is within the secure perimeter established around the National Mall during Independence Day events. Metro stopped closing Smithsonian station on July 4 beginning in 2009.

On April 14, 2016, Metro proposed to change the name of the station adding "National Mall" to the station name.

On June 25, 2017, "National Mall" was added as a subtitle to "Smithsonian".

From March 19, 2020, until June 28, 2020, this station was closed due to the COVID-19 pandemic.

From January 15 to January 21, 2021, this station was closed because of security concerns due to the Inauguration of Joe Biden, in light of the January 6 United States Capitol attack.

== Notable places nearby ==
- Several Federal Government buildings, including:
  - Bureau of Engraving and Printing
  - United States Department of Agriculture
  - United States Department of Energy
- National Mall
- Several Smithsonian museums, nearest are:
  - Arthur M. Sackler Gallery
  - Arts and Industries Building
  - Freer Gallery
  - Hirshhorn Museum
  - National Museum of African Art
  - National Museum of American History
  - National Museum of Natural History
  - National Museum of African American History and Culture
  - Smithsonian Institution Building (The "Castle")
- Tidal Basin (where the cherry blossoms bloom)
- United States Holocaust Memorial Museum
- Washington Monument
