= McPherson Square station =

Metro rail station in Washington, D.C.

Coordinates: 38°54′4.8″N 77°1′59.8″W

McPherson Square
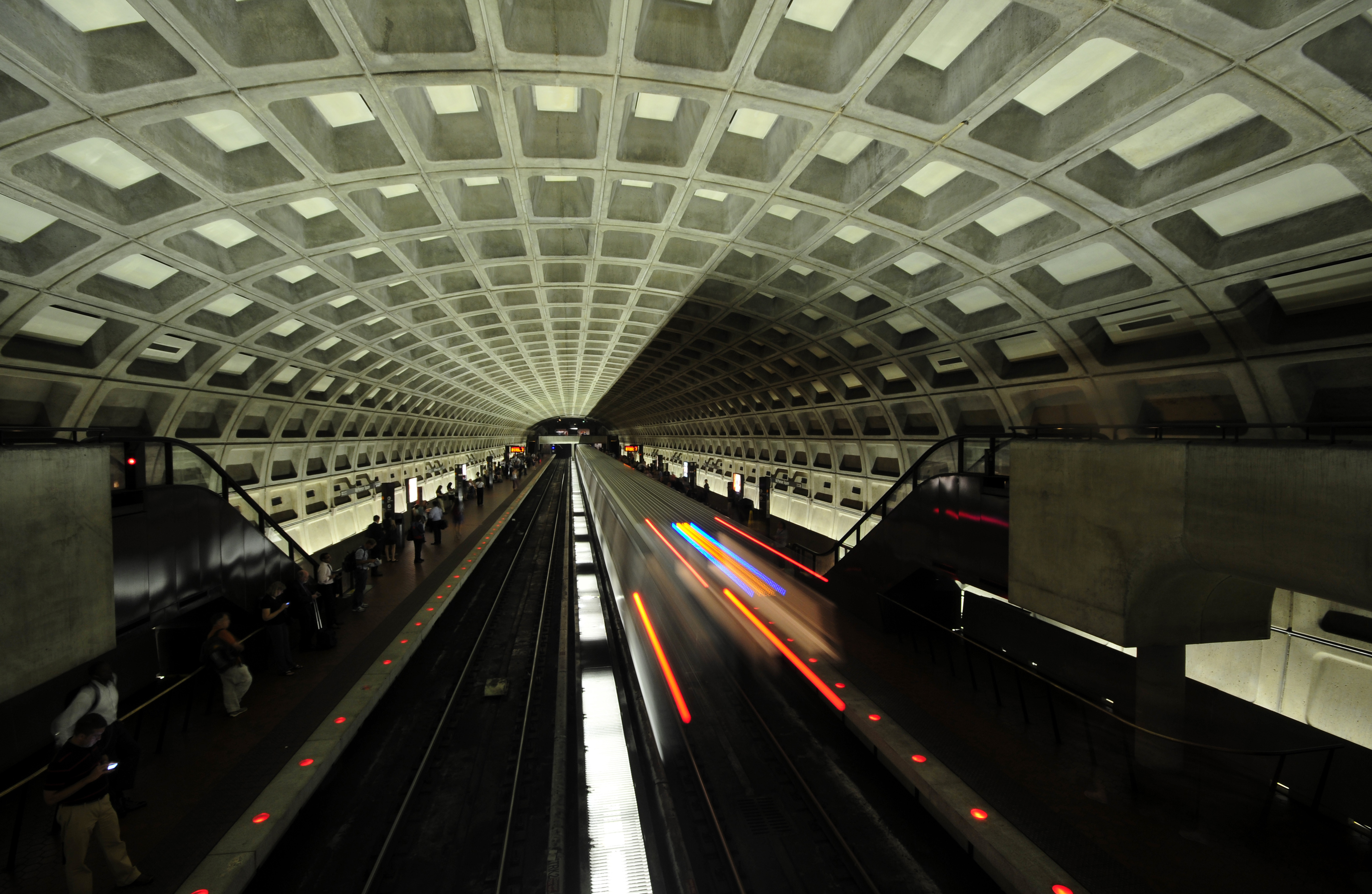
- Station view from the mezzanine in July 2012

General information
- Location: 1400 I Street NW; Washington, D.C.
- Owner: Washington Metropolitan Area Transit Authority
- Platforms: 2 side platforms
- Tracks: 2
- Connections: Metrobus: A29, A49, D10, D20, D24, D36, D50, D5X, D60, D6X, D72, D80, D94; Loudoun County Transit; MTA Maryland Commuter Bus; OmniRide Commuter

Construction
- Structure type: Underground
- Cycle facilities: Capital Bikeshare, 1 rack
- Accessible: Yes

Other information
- Station code: C02

History
- Opened: July 1, 1977; 49 years ago

Passengers
- 2025: 8,824 (average weekday)
- Rank: 14 of 98

Services
Preceding station	Washington Metro	Following station
Farragut West toward Vienna	Orange Line	Metro Center toward New Carrollton
Farragut West toward Ashburn	Silver Line	Metro Center toward Downtown Largo or New Carrollton
Farragut West toward Franconia–Springfield	Blue Line	Metro Center toward Downtown Largo
Route map
Location

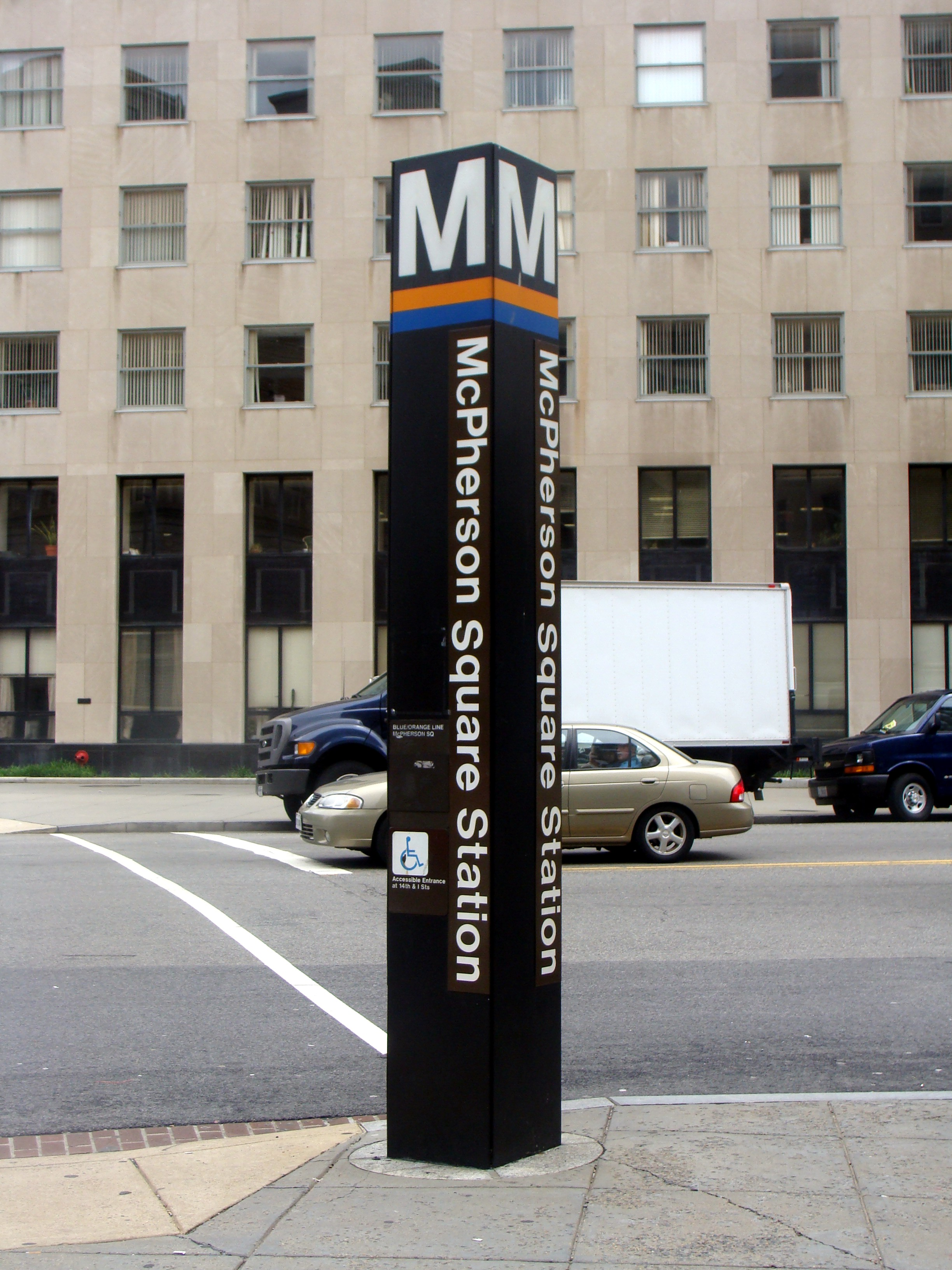
McPherson Square pylon

McPherson Square station is a Washington Metro station in Downtown, Washington, D.C., United States. The side-platformed station is operated by the Washington Metropolitan Area Transit Authority (WMATA). Providing service for the Blue, Orange, and Silver Lines, the station is located between McPherson Square and Franklin Square, with two entrances on I Street at Vermont Avenue and 14th Street NW. This is the main station to access the White House, and the Vermont Avenue exit is directly underneath the Department of Veterans Affairs building.

== History ==
The station opened on July 1, 1977. Its opening coincided with the completion of 11.8 miles (19.0 km) of rail between National Airport and RFK Stadium and the opening of the Arlington Cemetery, Capitol South, Crystal City, Eastern Market, Farragut West, Federal Center SW, Federal Triangle, Foggy Bottom–GWU, L'Enfant Plaza, National Airport, Pentagon, Pentagon City, Potomac Avenue, Rosslyn, Smithsonian, and Stadium–Armory stations. Orange Line service to the station began upon the line's opening on November 20, 1978.

Between January 15 to January 21, 2021, this station was closed because of security concerns due to the Inauguration of Joe Biden.

== Notable places nearby ==
- Blair House
- Department of the Treasury
- Center for American Progress
- American Constitution Society
- Hudson Institute
- Lafayette Square
- St. John's Episcopal Church
- Strayer University
- The Washington Post Headquarters
- The White House
