= Federal Center SW station =

Washington Metro station

Coordinates: 38.88499°N 77.01558°W

Federal Center SW
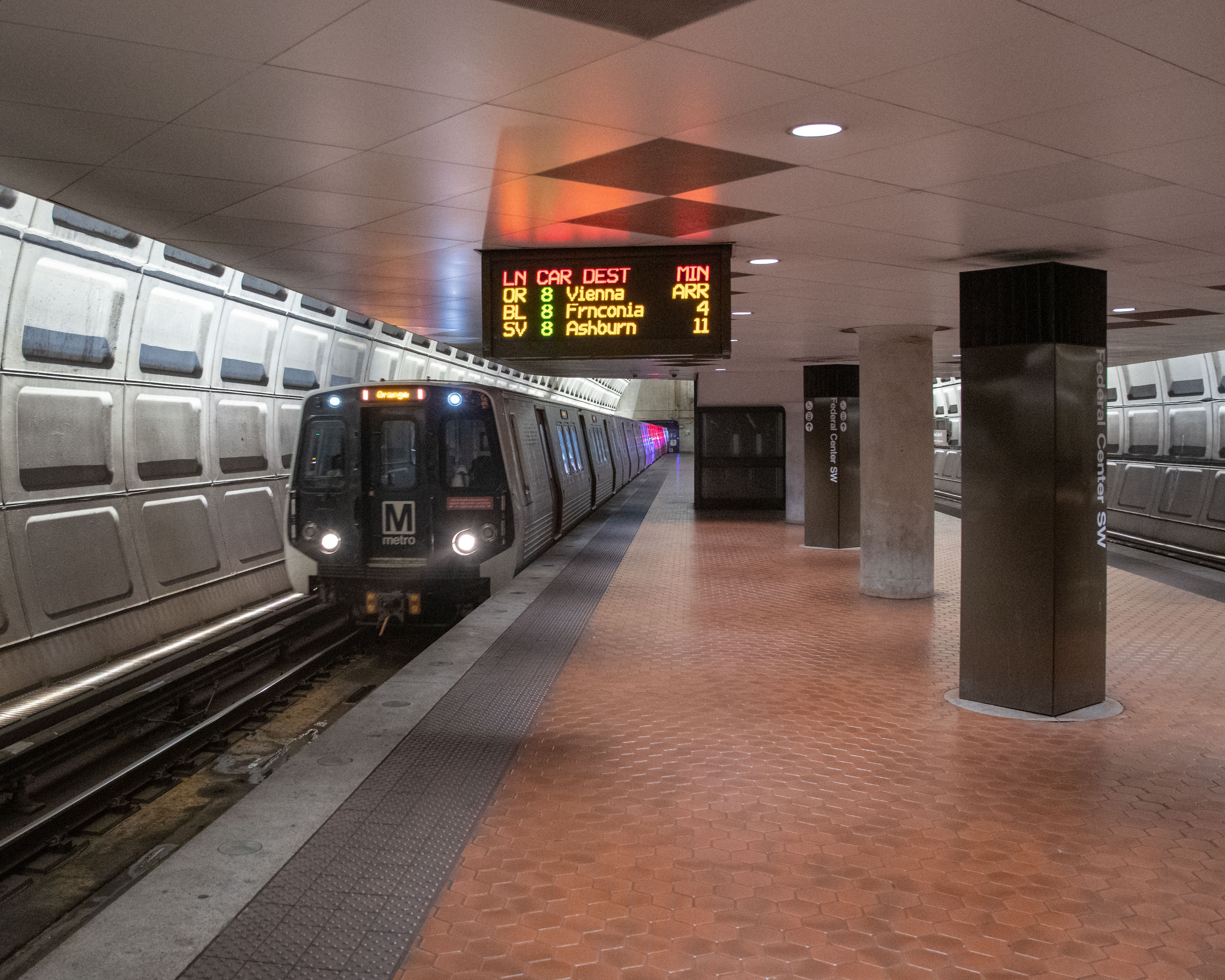
- Station platform with Westbound Orange Line train arriving in September 2023

General information
- Location: 401 Third St SW; Washington, D.C.
- Owner: Washington Metropolitan Area Transit Authority
- Platforms: 1 island platform
- Tracks: 2
- Connections: Metrobus: D10, D1X; MTA Maryland Commuter Bus: 230, 250, 305, 315, 325, 335, 345, 630, 725, 810, 820, 830, 840

Construction
- Structure type: Underground
- Cycle facilities: 2 racks
- Accessible: Yes

Other information
- Station code: D04

History
- Opened: July 1, 1977; 49 years ago

Passengers
- 2025: 3,387 (average weekday)
- Rank: 55 of 98

Services
Preceding station	Washington Metro	Following station
L'Enfant Plaza toward Vienna	Orange Line	Capitol South toward New Carrollton
L'Enfant Plaza toward Ashburn	Silver Line	Capitol South toward Downtown Largo or New Carrollton
L'Enfant Plaza toward Franconia–Springfield	Blue Line	Capitol South toward Downtown Largo
Route map
Location

Federal Center SW station is a Washington Metro station in an area known as the Southwest Federal Center in Washington, D.C., United States. The island-platformed station was opened on July 1, 1977, and is operated by the Washington Metropolitan Area Transit Authority (WMATA) and is located on the Orange, Silver, and Blue Lines. The station is located at 3rd and D Streets.

== History ==
In preliminary maps, this was named Voice of America station, after the government-owned radio service located a block away. In September 1971, Department of Health, Education and Welfare secretary Eliot Richardson suggested the current name, noting that "The Voice of America is by far the smallest agency in the Southwest area". The station opened on July 1, 1977. Its opening coincided with the completion of 11.8 miles (19.0 km) of rail between National Airport and RFK Stadium and the opening of the Arlington Cemetery, Capitol South, Crystal City, Eastern Market, Farragut West, Federal Triangle, Foggy Bottom–GWU, L'Enfant Plaza, McPherson Square, National Airport, Pentagon, Pentagon City, Potomac Avenue, Rosslyn, Smithsonian, and Stadium–Armory stations. Orange Line service to the station began upon the line's opening on November 20, 1978. Silver Line service at Federal Center SW began on July 26, 2014.

From March 26, 2020, until June 28, 2020, this station was closed due to the COVID-19 pandemic.

Between January 15 to 21, 2021, this station was closed because of security concerns due to the Inauguration of Joe Biden.
