= Capitol South station =

Washington Metro station

Coordinates: 38°53′8″N 77°0′21.8″W

Capitol South
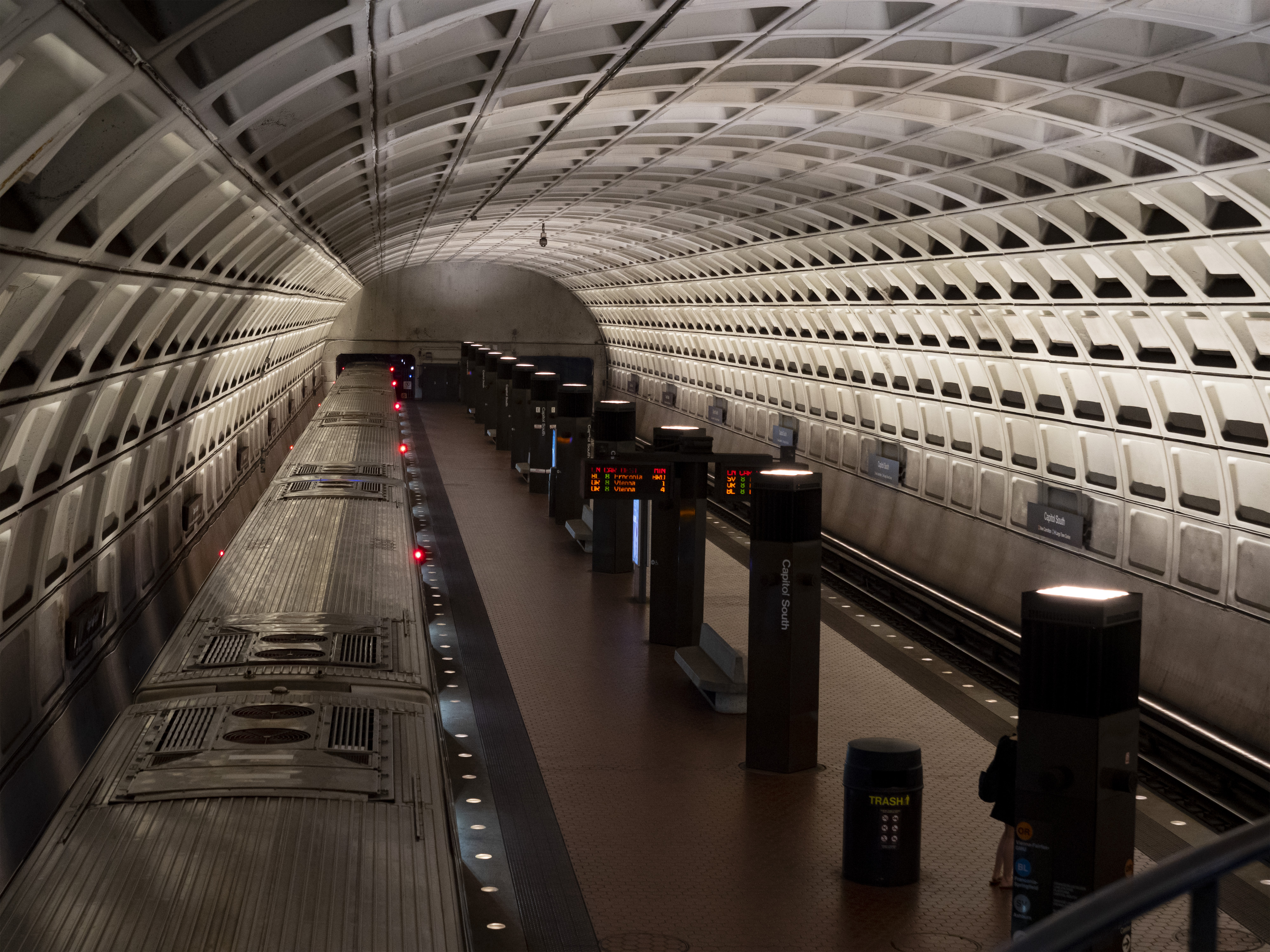
- Station platform with a Franconia-Springfield bound Blue Line train boarding in July 2021

General information
- Location: 355 First Street SE; Washington, D.C.
- Owner: Washington Metropolitan Area Transit Authority
- Platforms: 1 island platform
- Tracks: 2
- Connections: Metrobus: D10, D1X; MTA Maryland Commuter Bus; OmniRide Commuter

Construction
- Structure type: Underground
- Cycle facilities: Capital Bikeshare
- Accessible: Yes

Other information
- Station code: D05

History
- Opened: July 1, 1977; 49 years ago

Passengers
- 2025: 5,819 (average weekday)
- Rank: 23 of 98

Services
Preceding station	Washington Metro	Following station
Federal Center SW toward Vienna	Orange Line	Eastern Market toward New Carrollton
Federal Center SW toward Ashburn	Silver Line	Eastern Market toward Downtown Largo or New Carrollton
Federal Center SW toward Franconia–Springfield	Blue Line	Eastern Market toward Downtown Largo
Route map
Location

Capitol South station is a Washington Metro station in the Capitol Hill neighborhood of Washington, D.C., United States. The island-platformed station was opened on July 1, 1977, and is operated by the Washington Metropolitan Area Transit Authority (WMATA). The station currently provides service for the Blue, Orange, and Silver Lines.

== History ==
The station opened on July 1, 1977. Its opening coincided with the completion of 11.8 miles (19.0 km) of rail between National Airport and RFK Stadium and the opening of the Arlington Cemetery, Crystal City, Eastern Market, Farragut West, Federal Center SW, Federal Triangle, Foggy Bottom–GWU, L'Enfant Plaza, McPherson Square, National Airport, Pentagon, Pentagon City, Potomac Avenue, Rosslyn, Smithsonian and Stadium–Armory stations. Orange Line service to the station began upon the line's opening on November 20, 1978.

The station was painted white sometime in the 2000s.

Silver Line service at Capitol South began on July 26, 2014.

Between January 15 and January 21, 2021, this station was closed because of security concerns due to the Inauguration of Joe Biden.

== Location ==
Capitol South is located in the south-central section of the Capitol Hill neighborhood of Washington, D.C. It is surrounded by a wealth of government offices and buildings. Most importantly, it stands as the closest station to the Capitol Building which holds the Senate and House of Representatives. All three buildings of the Library of Congress are within a quarter-of-a-mile radius of Capitol South as are the Democratic National Committee and Republican National Committee headquarters. The Folger Shakespeare Library, the world's largest collection of printed Shakespearean works is a five-minute walk west from the station.

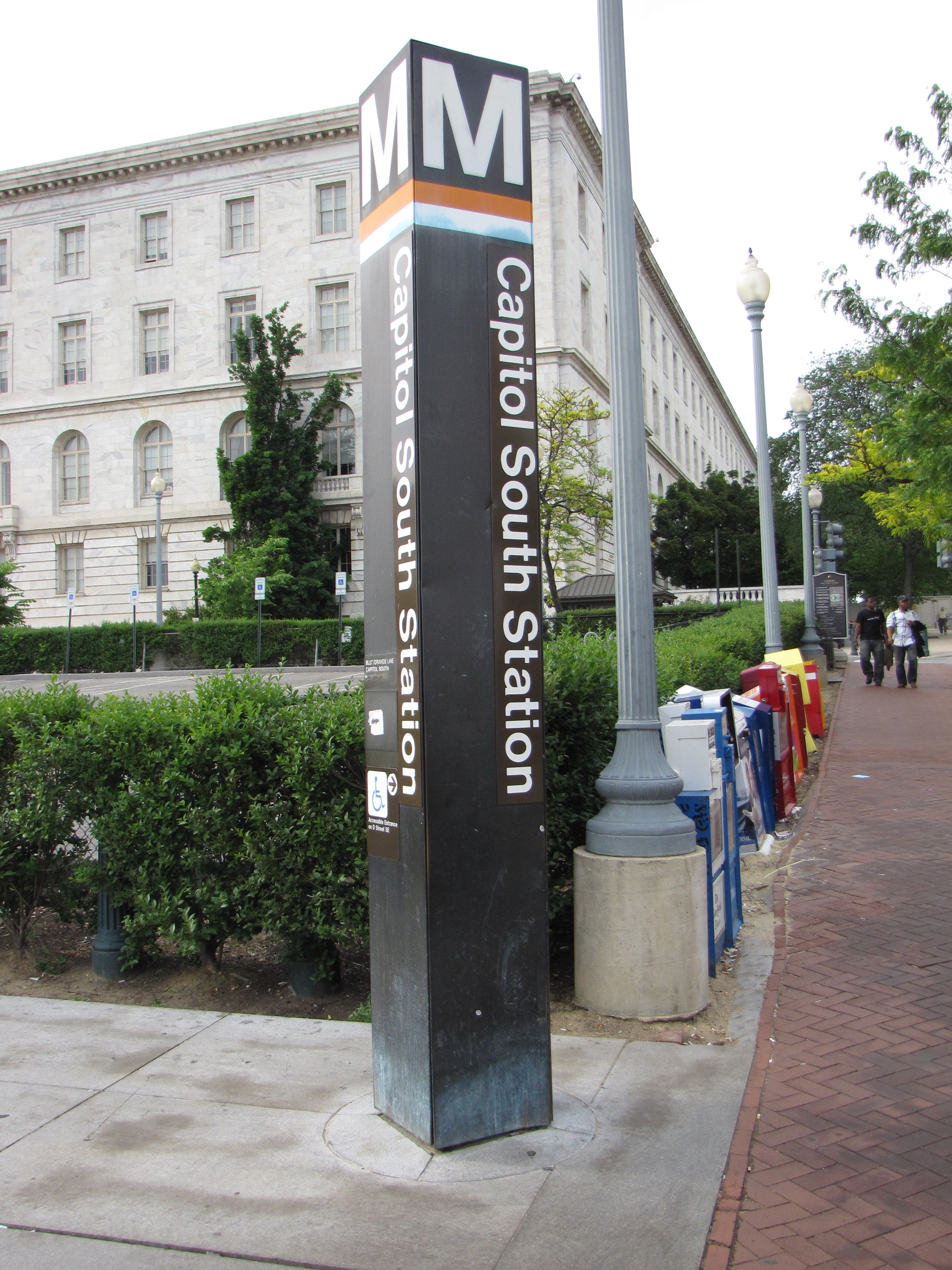
The station entrance pylon in May 2010.

== Station layout ==
There is only one entrance to the station located on the southwestern corner at the intersection of 1st Street SE and C Street SE. A row of three escalators and a staircase brings passengers to the station's mezzanine level, where they may buy tickets from vending machines and pass through the faregates. Once passengers pass through these faregates, a pair of escalators brings passengers onto the platform. There are two elevators for handicapped passengers, one from street level to the mezzanine on the northwestern corner at the intersection of 1st Street SE and D Street SE and another between the mezzanine and platform.

Capitol South station utilises an island platform layout with two tracks, D1 and D2. Eastbound trains to New Carrollton or Largo use track D1 whilst westbound trains to Vienna, Franconia–Springfield, or Ashburn use track D2.
