= Wisconsin Avenue Line =

Bus route in Washington, D.C., United States

D80, D82
- Wisconsin Avenue–Union Station Line; Wisconsin Avenue–Foggy Bottom Line

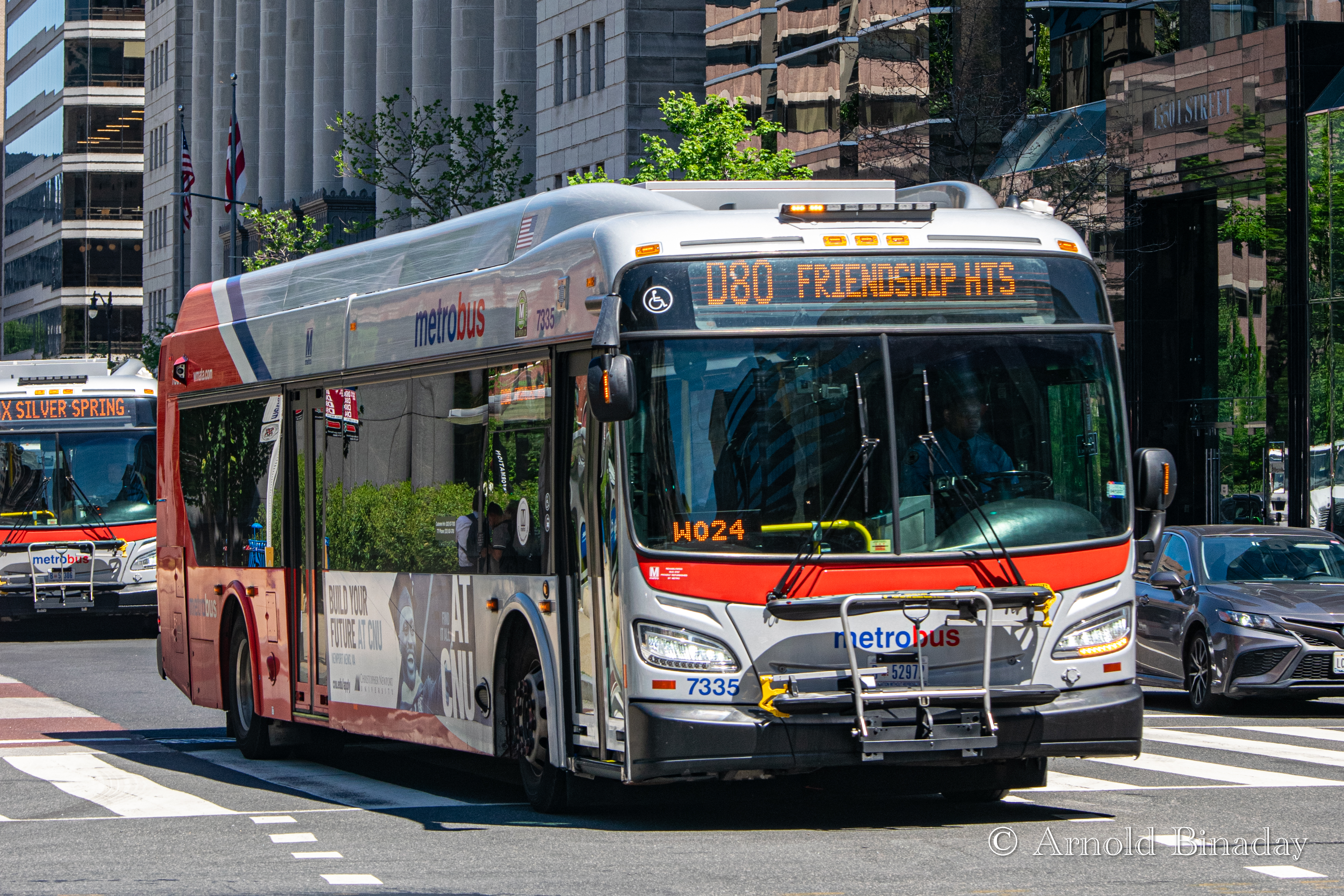
- Route D80 at McPherson Square

Overview
- System: Metrobus
- Operator: Washington Metropolitan Area Transit Authority
- Garage: Western; Montgomery
- Livery: Local
- Status: In Service
- Began service: 31: June 29, 2008; 33: August 24, 2014; D80, D82: June 29, 2025
- Ended service: 31, 33: June 28, 2025

Route
- Locale: Montgomery County, Northwest, Northeast
- Communities served: Chevy Chase, Friendship Heights, Tenleytown, McLean Gardens, Cathedral Heights, Glover Park, Georgetown, Foggy Bottom (D82), Potomac Park (D82), Downtown (D80), Mount Vernon Square (D80)
- Landmarks served: Friendship Heights station, Tenleytown station, Washington National Cathedral, Georgetown, Foggy Bottom station, George Washington University Hospital, Potomac Park (D82), Farragut West station (D80), Farragut North station (D80), White House (D80), McPherson Square station (D80), Walter E. Washington Convention Center (D80), Gallery Place station (D80), Capital One Arena (D80), Union Station (D80), Washington Union Station (D80)
- Start: Friendship Heights station
- Via: Wisconsin Avenue NW, 23rd Street NW (D82), H Street / I Street NW (D80), Massachusetts Avenue NW (D80)
- End: D80: Washington Union Station; D82: Potomac Park
- Other routes: D10, D1X

Service
- Level: D80: Daily; D82: Weekday Peak Hours
- Frequency: 10 - 12 Minutes (7AM - 9PM); 20 minutes (after 9PM) (D80 only)
- Operates: D80: 24 Hours; D82: 6:05 AM - 8:50 AM; 2:51 PM - 6:52 PM
- Ridership: 544,722 (31, FY 2025); 3,407,489 (33, FY 2025)
- Transfers: SmarTrip, contactless bank cards
- Timetable: Wisconsin Avenue Line

The Wisconsin Avenue Line, designated as the Wisconsin Avenue–Union Station Line on Route D80, and Wisconsin Avenue-Foggy Bottom Line on Route D82, are bus routes operated by the Washington Metropolitan Area Transit Authority. Its main purpose is to provide service to the upper Northwest side via Wisconsin Avenue NW.

== Background ==
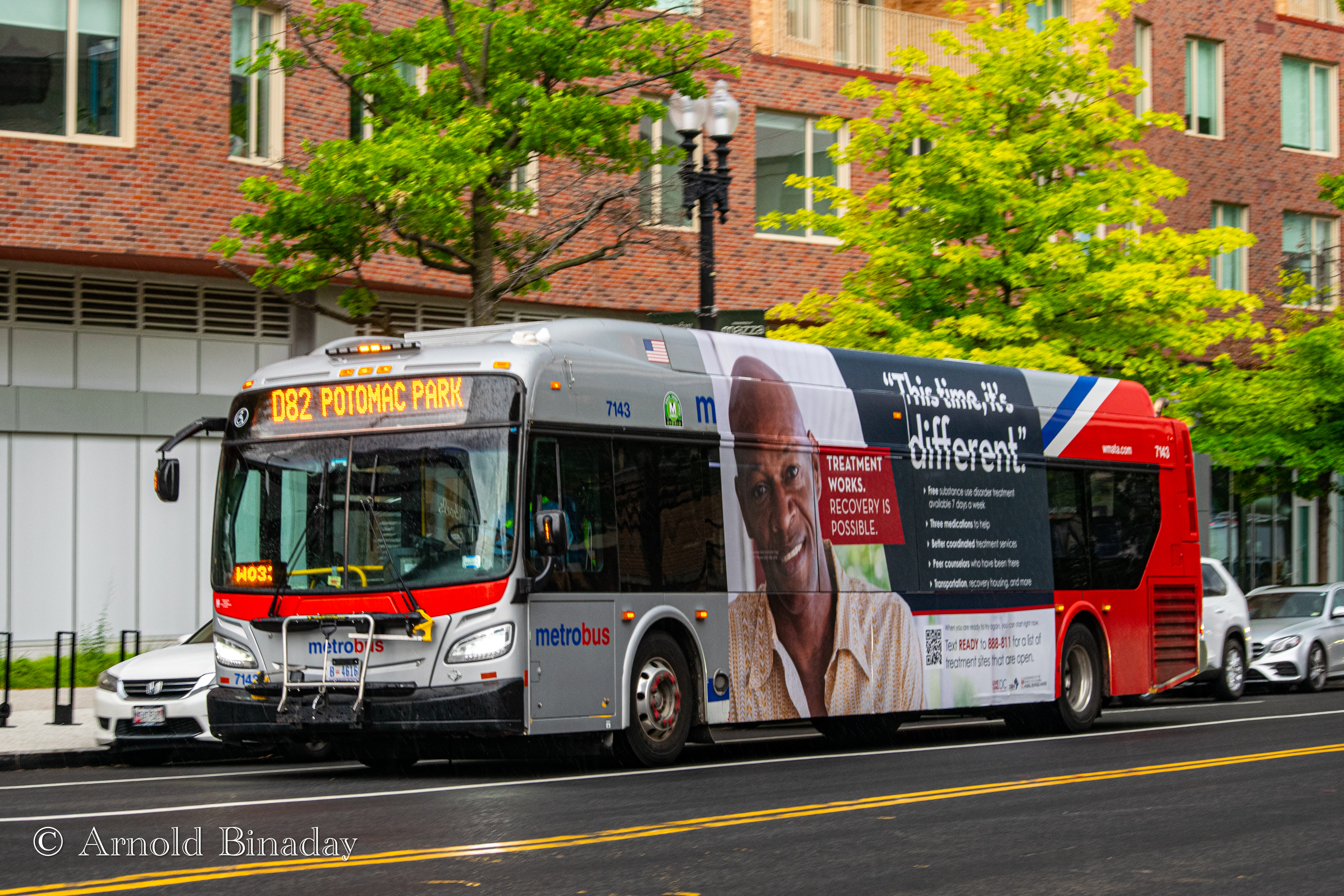
Route D82 at Friendship Heights

Routes D80 and D82 operate between the Friendship Heights station of the Red Line of the Washington Metro and Washington Union Station (D80) or Potomac Park (D82), running every 10 to 12 minutes between 6 AM and 9 PM on weekdays. In addition, Route D80 operates on weekends every 10 minutes during the day and 15 to 20 minutes after 9 PM daily. Route D80 trips are roughly 60 minutes long, while Route D82 trips are 45 minutes long. Route D80 operates 24 hours daily, while Route D82 operates during the weekday peak hours only.

The routes operate out of WMATA's Western division with overnight Route D80 service operating out of Montgomery division.

=== Route D80 stops ===
Bus stop	Direction	Connections
Montgomery County, Maryland
Friendship Heights Bus Bay C	Southbound stop, Northbound terminal	Metrobus: C83, D82, D96, M82; Ride On: 1, 11, 23, 29; Friendship Heights Village Bus; Washington Metro:
Washington, D.C.
Wisconsin Avenue NW / Western Avenue NW Friendship Heights	Northbound	Metrobus: C83, D82, D96, M82; Ride On: 1, 11, 23, 29; Friendship Heights Village Bus; Washington Metro:
Wisconsin Avenue NW / Jenifer Street NW Friendship Heights	Bidirectional	Metrobus: D82; Washington Metro:
Wisconsin Avenue NW / Fessenden Street NW	Bidirectional	Metrobus: D82
Wisconsin Avenue NW / Chesapeake Street NW	Southbound	Metrobus: D82
Wisconsin Avenue NW / Brandywine Street NW	Northbound	Metrobus: D82
Wisconsin Avenue NW / Albemarle Street NW Tenleytown–AU	Bidirectional	Metrobus: C51, C61, C81, C85, D82, D90; AU Shuttle; Washington Metro:
Wisconsin Avenue NW / Tenley Circle NW	Bidirectional	Metrobus: C51, C61, C81, D82
Wisconsin Avenue NW / Van Ness Street NW	Southbound	Metrobus: C51, C61, D82
Wisconsin Avenue NW / Veazey Street NW	Northbound	Metrobus: C51, C61, D82
Wisconsin Avenue NW / Upton Street NW	Bidirectional	Metrobus: C51, D82
Wisconsin Avenue NW / Rodman Street NW	Bidirectional	Metrobus: C51, D82
Wisconsin Avenue NW / Porter Street NW	Bidirectional	Metrobus: C51, D82
Wisconsin Avenue NW / Newark Street NW	Bidirectional	Metrobus: C51, D82
Wisconsin Avenue NW / Woodley Road NW	Bidirectional	Metrobus: C51, D82
Wisconsin Avenue NW / Cathedral Avenue NW	Bidirectional	Metrobus: D82
Wisconsin Avenue NW / Garfield Street NW	Bidirectional	Metrobus: D82
Wisconsin Avenue NW / Edmunds Street NW	Bidirectional	Metrobus: D82
Wisconsin Avenue NW / Calvert Street NW	Bidirectional	Metrobus: D82
Wisconsin Avenue NW / Hall Place NW	Bidirectional	Metrobus: D82
Wisconsin Avenue NW / 35th Street NW	Bidirectional	Metrobus D82
Wisconsin Avenue NW / 34th Street NW	Bidirectional	Metrobus: D82
Wisconsin Avenue NW / R Street NW	Bidirectional	Metrobus: D82
Wisconsin Avenue NW / Q Street NW	Bidirectional	Metrobus: D82
Wisconsin Avenue NW / P Street NW	Northbound	Metrobus: D82
Wisconsin Avenue NW / Dumbarton Street NW	Southbound	Metrobus: D82
M Street NW / Wisconsin Avenue NW	Southbound	Metrobus: A58, C85, D82
M Street NW / 31st Street NW	Northbound	Metrobus: A58, C85, D82
Pennsylvania Avenue NW / 28th Street NW	Bidirectional	Metrobus: A58, C85, D82
Pennsylvania Avenue NW / L Street NW	Southbound	Metrobus: A58, C85, D82
Pennsylvania Avenue NW / 26th Street NW	Northbound	Metrobus: A58, C85, D82
Pennsylvania Avenue NW / 24th Street NW	Bidirectional	Metrobus: A58, C85, D82
Pennsylvania Avenue NW / 22nd Street NW	Bidirectional	Metrobus: A58, C85, D10, D20, D74, D82; Washington Metro: at Foggy Bottom
Pennsylvania Avenue NW / 21st Street NW	Southbound	Metrobus: D10, D20
H Street NW / 18th Street NW Farragut West Farragut North	Southbound	Metrobus: A49, A58, D10, D20, D70, D72, D94, F19; MTA Maryland Bus: 901, 902, 904, 905, 909, 950, 995; Loudoun County Transit; PRTC OmniRide; MTA Maryland Bus: 305, 325; PRTC OmniRide; Washington Metro:
I Street NW / 18th Street NW Farragut West Farragut North	Northbound	Metrobus: A49, A58, D10, D20, D70, D72, D94, F19; PRTC OmniRide; Washington Metro:
I Street NW / 17th Street NW Farragut Square	Northbound	Metrobus: A49, A58, D10, D20, D70, D72, D94, F19; MTA Maryland Bus: 901, 902, 904, 905, 909, 950, 995; Loudoun County Transit; PRTC OmniRide; Washington Metro: (at Farragut West) (at Farragut North)
H Street NW / Madison Place NW McPherson Square	Southbound	Metrobus: A29, A49, D10, D20, D24, D36, D50, D5X, D60, D6X, D72, D94, F19; Washington Metro:
I Street NW / 15th Street NW McPherson Square	Northbound	Metrobus: A29, A49, D10, D20, D24, D36, D50, D5X, D60, D6X, D72, D94, F19; Washington Metro:
I Street NW / 14th Street NW	Northbound	Metrobus: A29, A49, D20, D24, D50, D5X, D60, D6X; Washington Metro: at McPherson Square
New York Avenue NW / 12th Street NW	Southbound	Metrobus: A29, A49, D20, D32, D34, D36, D44
I Street NW / 12th Street NW	Northbound	Metrobus: A29, A49, D20, D32, D34, D36, D44
New York Avenue NW / 9th Street NW	Bidirectional	
Massachusetts Avenue NW / 7th Street NW	Bidirectional	Metrobus: D20, D24, D2X, D30, D34, D36, D40, D4X; Washington Metro: at Gallery Place
Massachusetts Avenue NW / 5th Street NW	Bidirectional	Metrobus: D34, D36, D90
Massachusetts Avenue NW / New Jersey Avenue NW	Bidirectional	Metrobus: C51, D20
Massachusetts Avenue NW / G Street NW	Southbound	Metrobus: C51
New Jersey Avenue NW / F Street NW	Northbound	Metrobus: C51
E Street NE / Columbus Circle NE	Northbound stop, Southbound terminal	Amtrak, VRE, MARC at Union Station; Metrobus: C43, C51, C55, C71, D20, D2X, D24, D30; MTA Maryland Bus: 903, 922; Loudoun County Transit; PRTC OmniRide; Washington Metro: at Union Station

=== Route D82 stops ===
Bus stop	Direction	Connections
Montgomery County, Maryland
Friendship Heights Bus Bay C	Southbound stop, Northbound terminal	Metrobus: C83, D80, D96, M82; Ride On: 1, 11, 23, 29; Friendship Heights Village Bus; Washington Metro:
Washington, D.C.
Wisconsin Avenue NW / Western Avenue NW Friendship Heights	Northbound	Metrobus: C83, D80, D96, M82; Ride On: 1, 11, 23, 29; Friendship Heights Village Bus; Washington Metro:
Wisconsin Avenue NW / Jenifer Street NW Friendship Heights	Bidirectional	Metrobus: D80; Washington Metro:
Wisconsin Avenue NW / Fessenden Street NW	Bidirectional	Metrobus: D80
Wisconsin Avenue NW / Chesapeake Street NW	Southbound	Metrobus: D80
Wisconsin Avenue NW / Brandywine Street NW	Northbound	Metrobus: D80
Wisconsin Avenue NW / Albemarle Street NW Tenleytown–AU	Bidirectional	Metrobus: C51, C61, C81, C85, C87, D80, D90; AU Shuttle; Washington Metro:
Wisconsin Avenue NW / Tenley Circle NW	Bidirectional	Metrobus: C51, C61, C81, D80, D96
Wisconsin Avenue NW / Van Ness Street NW	Southbound	Metrobus: C51, C61, D80
Wisconsin Avenue NW / Veazey Street NW	Northbound	Metrobus: C51, C61, D80
Wisconsin Avenue NW / Upton Street NW	Bidirectional	Metrobus: C51, C61, D80
Wisconsin Avenue NW / Rodman Street NW	Bidirectional	Metrobus: C51, C61, D80
Wisconsin Avenue NW / Porter Street NW	Bidirectional	Metrobus: C51, C61, D80
Wisconsin Avenue NW / Newark Street NW	Bidirectional	Metrobus: C51, D80
Wisconsin Avenue NW / Woodley Road NW	Bidirectional	Metrobus: C51, D80
Wisconsin Avenue NW / Cathedral Avenue NW	Bidirectional	Metrobus: D80, D90
Wisconsin Avenue NW / Garfield Street NW	Bidirectional	Metrobus: D80
Wisconsin Avenue NW / Edmunds Street NW	Bidirectional	Metrobus: D80
Wisconsin Avenue NW / Calvert Street NW	Bidirectional	Metrobus: D80
Wisconsin Avenue NW / Hall Place NW	Bidirectional	Metrobus: D80
Wisconsin Avenue NW / 35th Street NW	Bidirectional	Metrobus: D80
Wisconsin Avenue NW / 34th Street NW	Bidirectional	Metrobus: D80
Wisconsin Avenue NW / R Street NW	Bidirectional	Metrobus: D80
Wisconsin Avenue NW / Q Street NW	Bidirectional	Metrobus: C91, D80, D94, D96
Wisconsin Avenue NW / P Street NW	Northbound	Metrobus: D80
Wisconsin Avenue NW / Dumbarton Street NW	Southbound	Metrobus: D80
M Street NW / Wisconsin Avenue NW	Southbound	Metrobus: A58, C85, D80
M Street NW / 31st Street NW	Northbound	Metrobus: A58, C85, D80
Pennsylvania Avenue NW / 28th Street NW	Bidirectional	Metrobus: A58, C85, D80
Pennsylvania Avenue NW / L Street NW	Southbound	Metrobus: A58, C85, D80
Pennsylvania Avenue NW / 26th Street NW	Northbound	Metrobus: A58, C85, D80
Pennsylvania Avenue NW / 24th Street NW	Bidirectional	Metrobus: A58, C85, D80
23rd Street NW / I Street NW Foggy Bottom-GWU	Bidirectional	Metrobus: A58, C85, D10, D20, D74, D80; Washington Metro:
23rd Street NW / G Street NW	Bidirectional	Metrobus: D74
F Street NW / 22nd Street NW	Westbound	Metrobus: D74
F Street NW / 21st Street NW	Westbound	Metrobus: D74, D96
Virginia Avenue NW / E Street NW Potomac Park	Northbound stop, Southbound terminal	Metrobus: D74, D96

== History ==
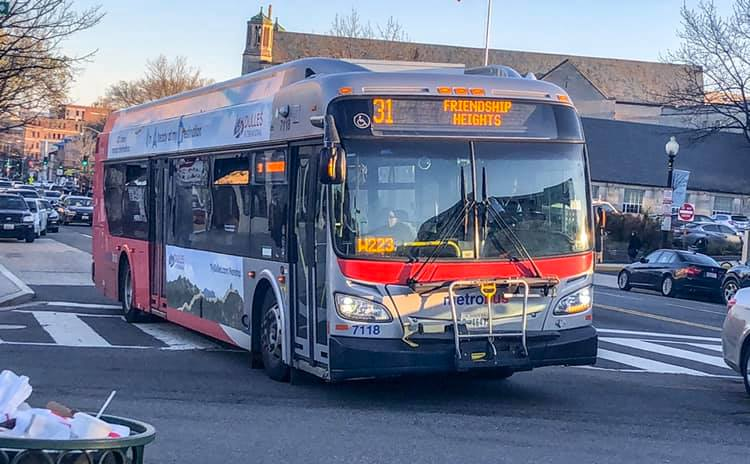
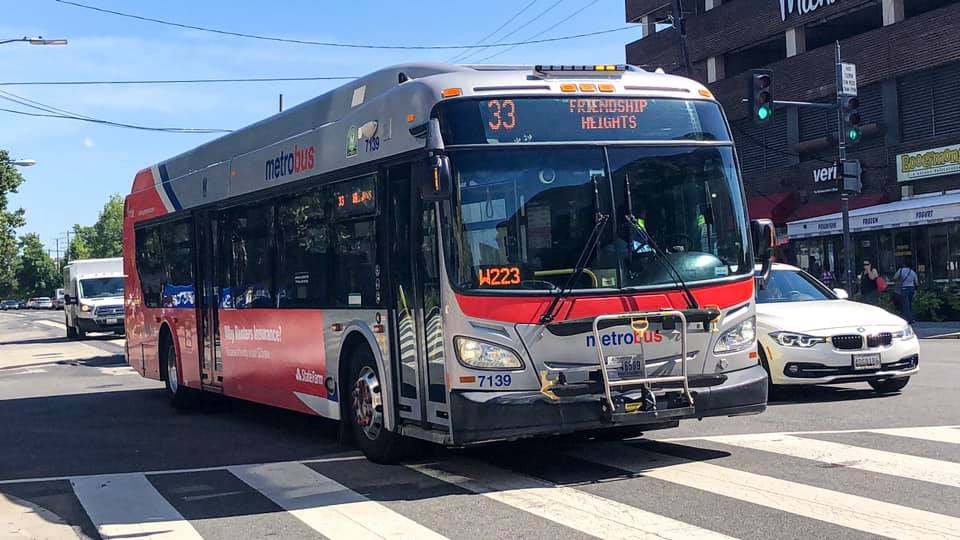
Former Routes 31 and 33.

Before WMATA implemented the Better Bus Redesign network, Route D80 was previously known as Route 33, while Route D82 was previously known as Route 31. The 30 series line is one of the oldest transit routes in the city, tracing its origin to streetcar lines and the Washington and Georgetown Railroad in the 1860s. Buses began to operate on the line in 1936. Today, it is one of the most-ridden bus lines in D.C., serving more than 20,000 passengers a day in 2008.

The five routes, 30, 32, 34, 35, and 36, begin their journey at Friendship Heights station and end at Potomac Avenue station (30), Southern Avenue station (32), or Naylor Road station (34, 35, and 36).

In 2008, WMATA launched a study on the Pennsylvania Avenue line to improve services and to reduce delays and bus bunchings.

=== Route 31 ===
Route 31 was introduced on June 29, 2008, dubbed as a "neighborhood connector" as part of an overhaul of the busy Pennsylvania Avenue Line. Route 31 connects Friendship Heights station to Potomac Park to provide help to routes 32 and 36 along Wisconsin Avenue and replace routes 30, 34, and 35.

=== Route 33 ===
As part of proposals from 2013 to simplify the Wisconsin Avenue Line again, route 33 was introduced on August 24, 2014 to replace the 32 and 36 portion along Wisconsin Avenue and to provide extra service to the 31, and the newly introduced Friendship Heights–Southeast Line or routes 30N and 30S. Route 33 provides more service between Friendship Heights station and Federal Triangle to help out the 30N, 30S, and 31. Routes 32 and 36 were shorten to Potomac Park being replaced by routes 30N, 30S, 31, and 33.

=== Changes ===
In 2019, as a part of WMATA's Blue/Orange/Silver Line Corridor Capacity & Reliability Study (BOS Study), the transit agency suggested, as one of six potential options, realigning Metrorail's Blue Line along Wisconsin Avenue, terminating at Friendship Heights or Bethesda station, after crossing over the Potomac River from Georgetown from Rosslyn. The proposal was ultimately not included among WMATA's list of four finalists in 2023.

During the COVID-19 pandemic, routes 31 and 33 operated on their Saturday supplemental schedule during the weekdays beginning on March 16, 2020. On March 18, 2020, the line was further reduced to operate on its Sunday schedule. Weekend service was later suspended on March 21, 2020 being replaced by Routes 30N and 30S. On August 23, 2020, routes 31 and 33 restored its regular schedule but Route 31 weekend service was suspended being replaced by Route 33.

On September 26, 2020, WMATA proposed to eliminate all route 31 weekend service and add route 33 trips due to low federal funding in response to the COVID-19 pandemic. Weekday service will not change. Later in February 2021 during WMATA's FY2022 budget crisis, WMATA proposed to increase span to add late-night service to 2:00 AM on Route 33 between July and December 2021 in the first half of the fiscal year, but would reduce it back to midnight between January to June 2022 in the second half of the fiscal year. Subsequently on April 22, 2021, WMATA approved the FY2022 budget and received federal funding to avoid service cuts.

On June 6, 2021, late-night service was increased to operate up to 2:00 AM on Route 33.

On June 10, 2021, WMATA proposed to increase the 31 and 33 to operate every 12 minutes daily between 7:00 AM to 9:00 PM daily as part of WMATA's Pandemic Recovery Plan.

On September 5, 2021, the line was increased to operate every 12 minutes daily. However, all 31 weekend service was discontinued and replaced by increased 33 service.

Due to rising cases of the COVID-19 Omicron variant, the line was reduced to its Saturday service on weekdays with Route 31 being suspended. Full weekday service and all Route 31 service resumed on February 7, 2022.

On May 29, 2022, all late-night route 33 service was extended to terminate at L'Enfant Plaza station via 7th Street.

On December 17, 2023, new 24 hour service was added to Route 33.

In 2024 during WMATA's FY2024 Budget crisis, WMATA proposed to combine all 31 and 33 service into one route, operating on the current 31 between Friendship Heights and Potomac Park, and taking the Route 33 numbering. All 33 service between Washington Circle NW and Federal Triangle/L'Enfant Plaza would be eliminated. However on April 25, 2024, Metro’s Board of Directors approved a $4.8 billion capital and operating budget which avoided service cuts.

On December 15, 2024, Route 31 was changed to operate during weekday peak hours only, and Route 33 was rerouted to Washington Union Station via H Street/I Street and Massachusetts Avenue at all times. This was in response to DC Circulator being discontinued on January 1, 2025. Service to Federal Triangle and L'Enfant Plaza station was eliminated.

=== Better Bus Redesign ===
In 2022, WMATA launched its Better Bus Redesign project, which aimed to redesign the entire Metrobus Network and is the first full redesign of the agency's bus network in its history.

In April 2023, WMATA launched its Draft Visionary Network. As part of the drafts, WMATA proposed to combine the 31 and 33 into one route and operate on the current 33 routing between Friendship Heights station and Federal Triangle as Route DC101 in the draft. The route would also be extended from Friendship Heights station to Bethesda station via Wisconsin Avenue.

During WMATA's Revised Draft Visionary Network, WMATA renamed the DC101 to Route D82 and modified it to operate between Friendship Heights station and Archives station via the current 33 routing between Friendship Heights station and the intersection of Pennsylvania Avenue NW and 10th Street NW, then would continue along Pennsylvania Avenue NW, 7th Street NW, Constitution Avenue NW, and 9th Street NW to Archives station. A new Route D8X would operate alongside the D82 between Bethesda station and Archives station, following the originally proposed Route DC101 routing, with the route not terminating at Federal Triangle. However during the proposals, WMATA dropped the D8X from the proposals completely and modified the D82 to operate to McPherson Square station via H Street NW, I Street NW, 14th Street NW, K Street NW, and 13th Street NW. The changes were then proposed during WMATA's 2025 Proposed Network.

In later proposals, WMATA renamed the D82 to Route D80 and changed it again to operate to Washington Union Station via New York Avenue NW and Massachusetts Avenue NW. Service to Federal Triangle and L'Enfant Plaza station was eliminated. Route 31 was also reintroduced to the proposals as Route D82 to operate between Friendship Heights and Potomac Park via the current 31 routing. However, the route would only operate during weekday peak hours, discontinuing all non-peak period service. These changes were made in response to DC Circulator's Georgetown–Union Station being discontinued beginning on January 1, 2025. Ultimately these changes were approved in October 2024 and were implimented on December 15, 2024.

On November 21, 2024, WMATA approved its Better Bus Redesign Network.

Beginning on June 29, 2025, Routes 31 and 33 were renamed to the D80 (33) and D82 (31), keeping the same routing from the December 2024 changes.

== Incidents ==
- On June 3, 2022, a man was stabbed onboard a 33 bus along Wisconsin Avenue near Newark Street NW. He was taken to the hospital in serious condition. The suspect fled the scene.
- On October 21, 2023, a man was stabbed onboard a 33 bus at 34th St and Wisconsin Ave. The suspect fled the scene.
