= Rosslyn station =

Washington Metro station in Virginia, US

Rosslyn
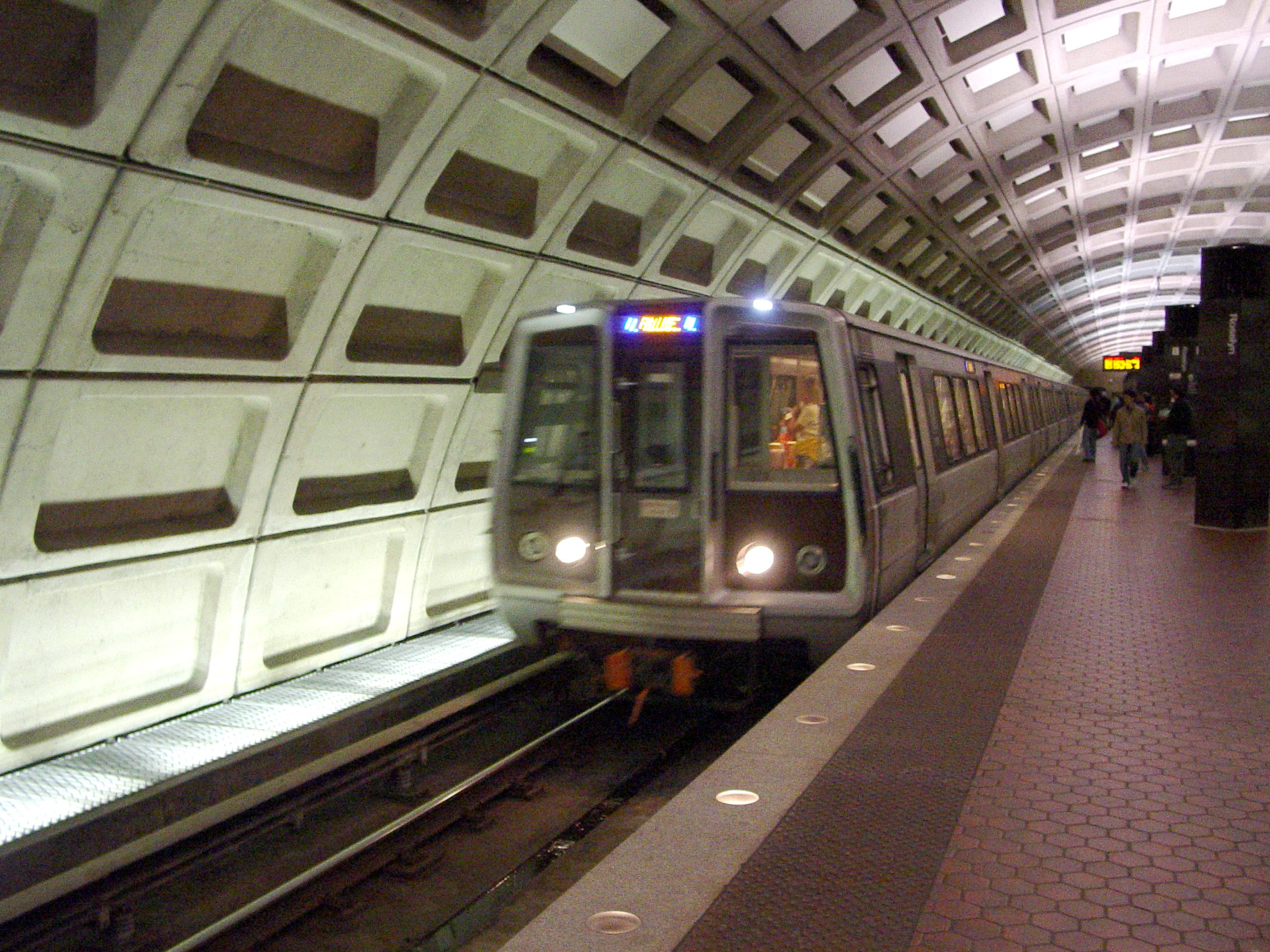
- A Blue Line train arriving on the upper level in April 2005

General information
- Location: 1850 North Moore Street; Rosslyn, Virginia
- Coordinates: 38.896031°N 77.071846°W
- Owner: Washington Metropolitan Area Transit Authority
- Platforms: 2 split side platforms (1 on each level)
- Tracks: 2 (1 on each level)
- Connections: Arlington Transit: 45, 55, 56 Metrobus: A58, A76, F62; Loudoun County Transit; Georgetown University Shuttle; Ride Smart Northern Shenandoah Valley

Construction
- Structure type: Underground
- Depth: 103 feet (31 m) (upper level); 117 feet (36 m) (lower level)
- Platform levels: 2
- Cycle facilities: Capital Bikeshare, 20 racks
- Accessible: yes

Other information
- Station code: C05

History
- Opened: July 1, 1977; 49 years ago

Passengers
- 2025: 8,095 (average weekday)
- Rank: 15 of 98

Services
Preceding station	Washington Metro	Following station
Court House toward Vienna	Orange Line	Foggy Bottom–GWU toward New Carrollton
Court House toward Ashburn	Silver Line	Foggy Bottom–GWU toward Downtown Largo or New Carrollton
Arlington Cemetery toward Franconia–Springfield	Blue Line	Foggy Bottom–GWU toward Downtown Largo
Route map
Location

Rosslyn station /ˈrɒzlɪn/ is the westernmost station on the shared segment of the Blue, Orange, and Silver lines of the Washington Metro. It is in the Rosslyn neighborhood of Arlington County, Virginia, United States. Rosslyn is the first station in Virginia heading westward from Washington, D.C. on the Orange and Silver Lines and southward on the Blue Line. It is one of four interchange points on the Metrorail system west of the Potomac River and located in a growing business district.

Averaging 5,941 daily tapped entries in 2023, Rosslyn is the eleventh-busiest station in the Metro system and the busiest station outside Washington, D.C. Rosslyn is the biggest choke point of the Metro system. Due to this, planners are considering adding another station in the Rosslyn neighborhood, possibly as part of an inner loop through Washington and Arlington.

== Station layout ==
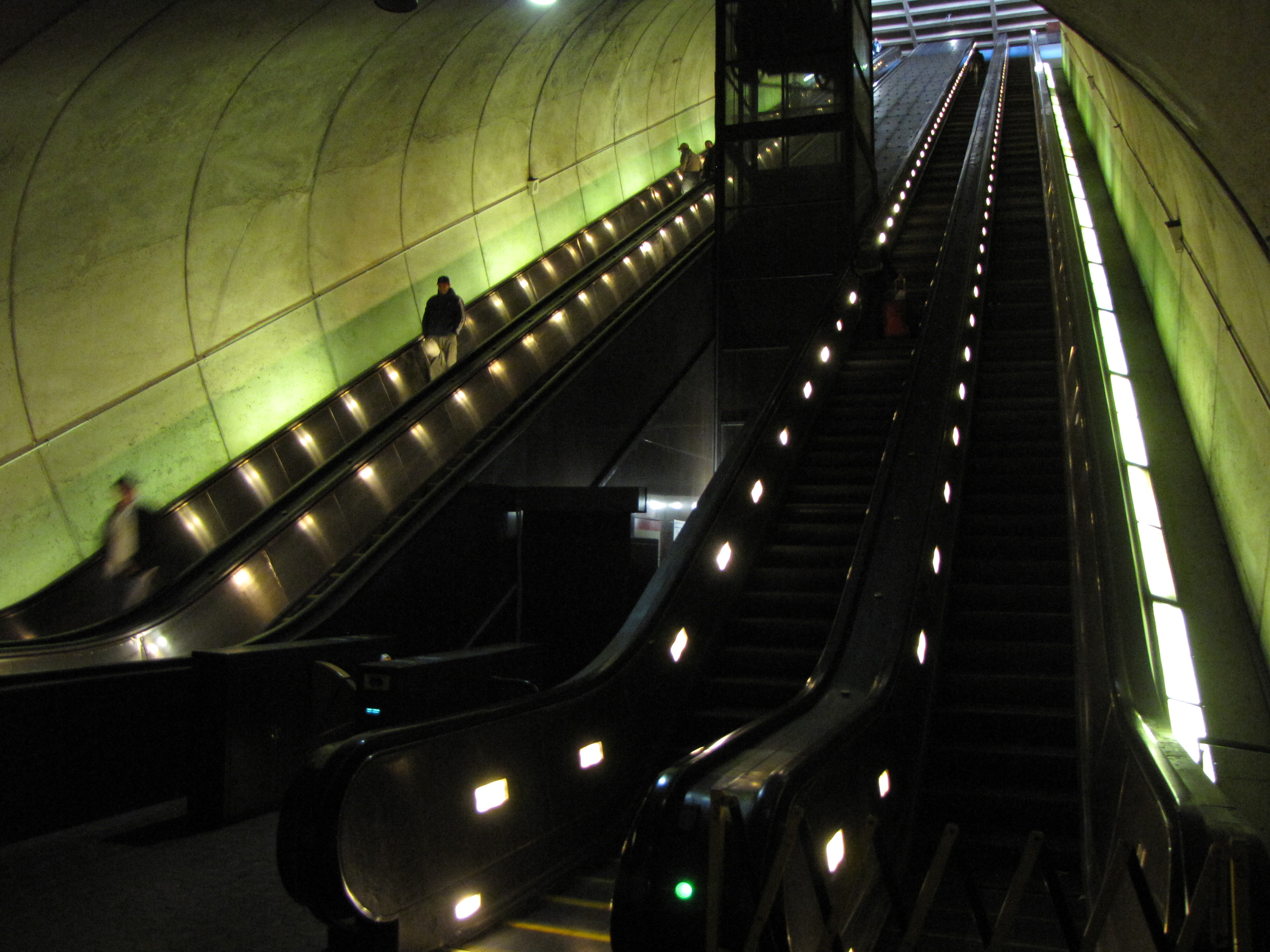
The escalator to street level at the Rosslyn Metro station is the fifth-longest continuous span escalator in the D.C. metro system.

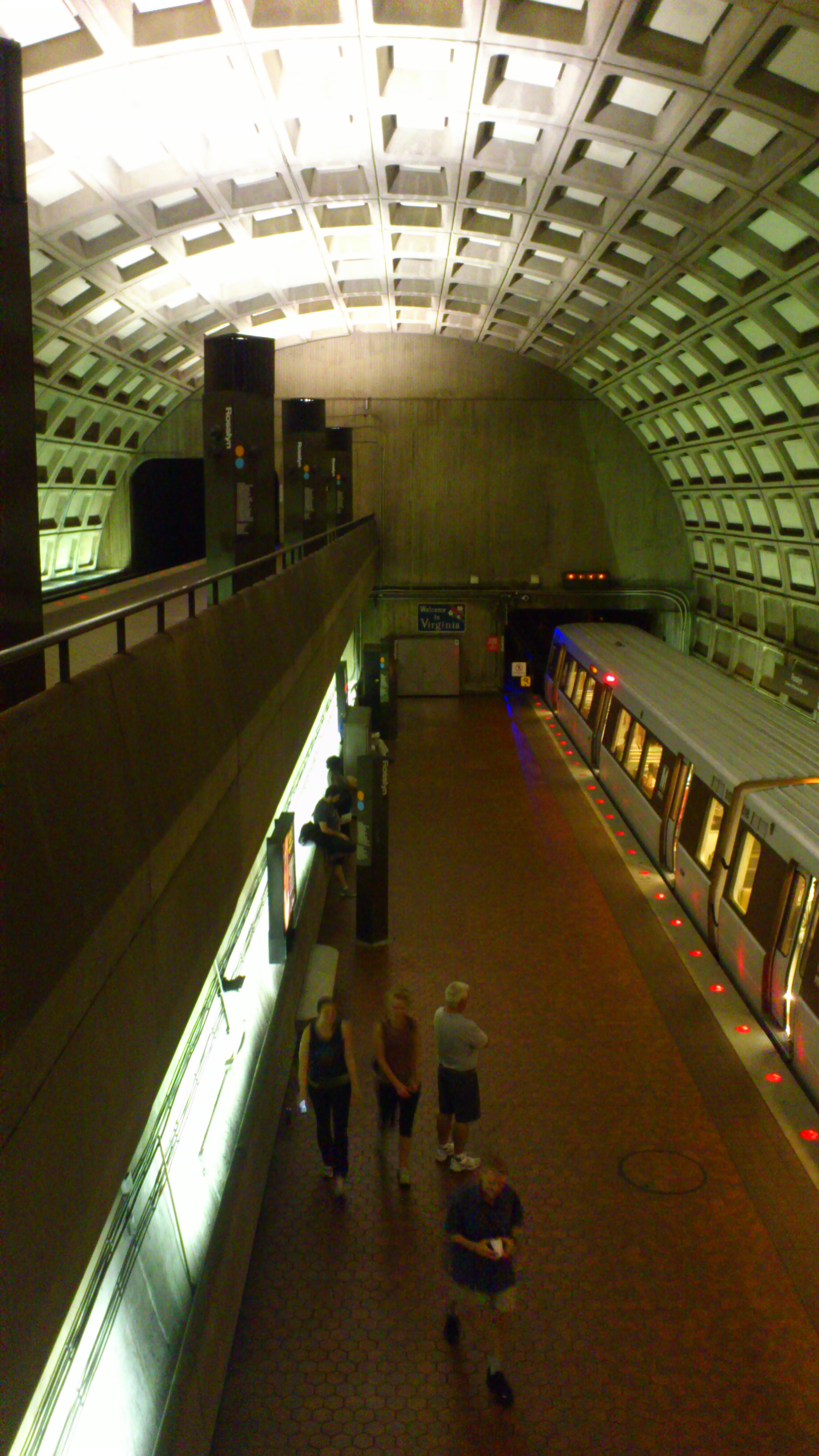
View of the stacked platform layout of Rosslyn station.

The station has entrances on the west side of North Moore Street between Wilson Boulevard and 19th Street North and on the east side of Fort Myer Drive between Wilson Boulevard and 19th Street North. A bank of three high-speed street elevators to the mezzanine (upper) level of the station is on the east side of North Moore Street, across the street from the station entrance. The station was historically a stop for several express Metrobus lines, including the now-discontinued D.C.–Dulles Line (route 5A).

Rosslyn is one of two stations (the other being the Pentagon station) at which trains going one direction are boarded on a different station level than trains going the other direction, as a way to prevent an at-grade crossing. This is because the Orange/Silver and Blue lines split apart an extremely short distance from the station. This ensures that no trains traveling in opposite directions share a track. An indicator sign at the south end of the station flashes to inform passengers of the arriving train's destination, showing Orange for Vienna, Blue for Franconia-Springfield, and Silver for Ashburn. This feature is only used at final transfer stations; another example being Stadium-Armory.

Rosslyn is the deepest station on the three lines servicing it. The mezzanine and upper platform are 103 feet (31 m) below the Fort Myer Drive street-level entrance; the lower platform is 117 feet (36 m) below the entrance. This is because its neighborhood is on a bluff over the Potomac River, while its shared rail line into Washington passes through a rock-bored tunnel up to 101 feet (31 m) beneath the river surface. The station's depth also takes advantage of the strength and watertightness of the bedrock 40 feet (12 m) below the surface. An escalator ride between the street and mezzanine levels takes about three minutes.

The separate accessible entrance and general entrances are a relative rarity in the Washington Metro system; only Judiciary Square, Takoma, and Tenleytown-AU stations share this feature. The underground hallway to the new elevator bank contains a four-coffered arch like most underground stops on the Red Line that were opened after 1980. This is the only stop on the Blue, Orange, and Silver Lines with this arch. It is also the only stop in the system that contains both the waffle and four-coffer arch design.

== History ==
The station opened on July 1, 1977. Its opening coincided with the completion of 11.8 miles (19.0 km) of rail between National Airport and RFK Stadium and the opening of the Arlington Cemetery, Capitol South, Crystal City, Eastern Market, Farragut West, Federal Center SW, Federal Triangle, Foggy Bottom–GWU, L'Enfant Plaza, McPherson Square, National Airport, Pentagon, Pentagon City, Potomac Avenue, Smithsonian and Stadium–Armory stations. Orange Line service to the station began upon the line's opening on November 20, 1978.

A new bank of three high-speed elevators and an expanded mezzanine officially opened on October 7, 2013. It replaces the original single street elevator, cutting elevator transit time from about a minute to about 17 seconds. This project also included an emergency stairwell, station manager kiosk, and new pay stations and had a total cost of $49.9 million, of which Arlington County paid for 42.2%.
