= Potomac Avenue station =

Washington Metro station

Coordinates: 38°52′51″N 76°59′6.7″W

Potomac Avenue
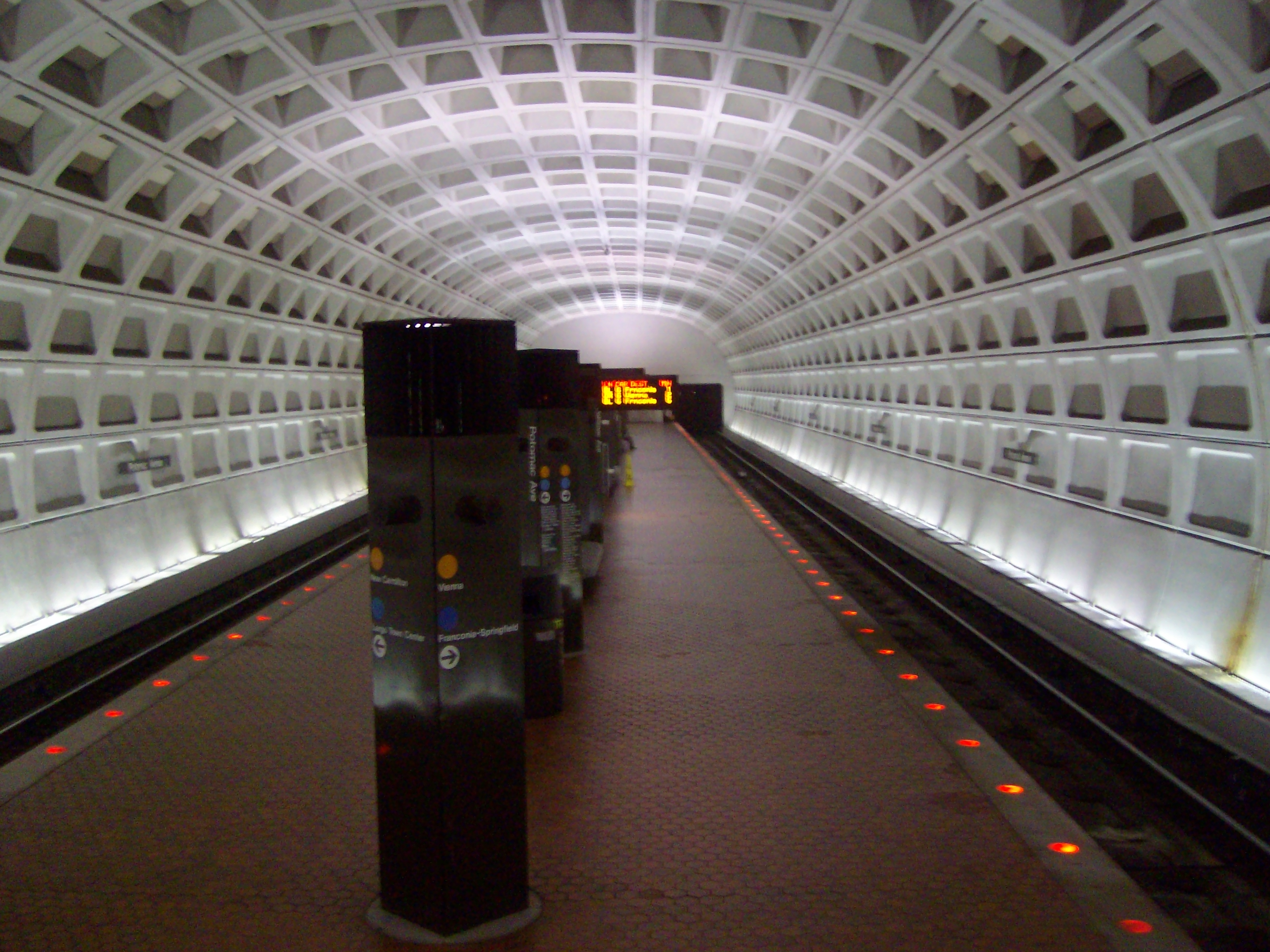
- Station view of Potomac Avenue in April 2010

General information
- Location: 700 14th Street SE; Washington, D.C.
- Owner: Washington Metropolitan Area Transit Authority
- Platforms: 1 island platform
- Tracks: 2
- Connections: Metrobus: C15, C37, C41, C51, D10, D1X; Anacostia Riverwalk Trail

Construction
- Structure type: Underground
- Cycle facilities: Capital Bikeshare, 4 racks
- Accessible: Yes

Other information
- Station code: D07

History
- Opened: July 1, 1977; 49 years ago

Passengers
- 2025: 2,991 (average weekday)
- Rank: 60 of 98

Services
Preceding station	Washington Metro	Following station
Eastern Market toward Vienna	Orange Line	Stadium–Armory toward New Carrollton
Eastern Market toward Ashburn	Silver Line	Stadium–Armory toward Downtown Largo or New Carrollton
Eastern Market toward Franconia–Springfield	Blue Line	Stadium–Armory toward Downtown Largo
Route map
Location

Potomac Avenue station is an island-platformed Washington Metro station in the Capitol Hill neighborhood of Washington, D.C., U.S.. The station was opened on July 1, 1977, and is operated by the Washington Metropolitan Area Transit Authority (WMATA). The station currently provides service for the Blue, Orange, and Silver Lines and is located near the neighborhood border of Hill East.

== History ==
The station's opening coincided with the completion of 11.8 miles (19.0 km) of rail between National Airport and RFK Stadium and the opening of the Arlington Cemetery, Capitol South, Crystal City, Eastern Market, Farragut West, Federal Center SW, Federal Triangle, Foggy Bottom–GWU, L'Enfant Plaza, McPherson Square, National Airport, Pentagon, Pentagon City, Rosslyn, Smithsonian, and Stadium–Armory stations. Orange Line service to the station began upon the line's opening on November 20, 1978. Silver Line service at Potomac Avenue began on July 26, 2014.

On February 1, 2023, transit worker Robert Cunningham was killed, and three other people were injured by a shooter who entered the station after an altercation on a bus.
