= Eastern Market station =

Washington Metro station

Coordinates: 38.8842°N 76.9958°W

Eastern Market
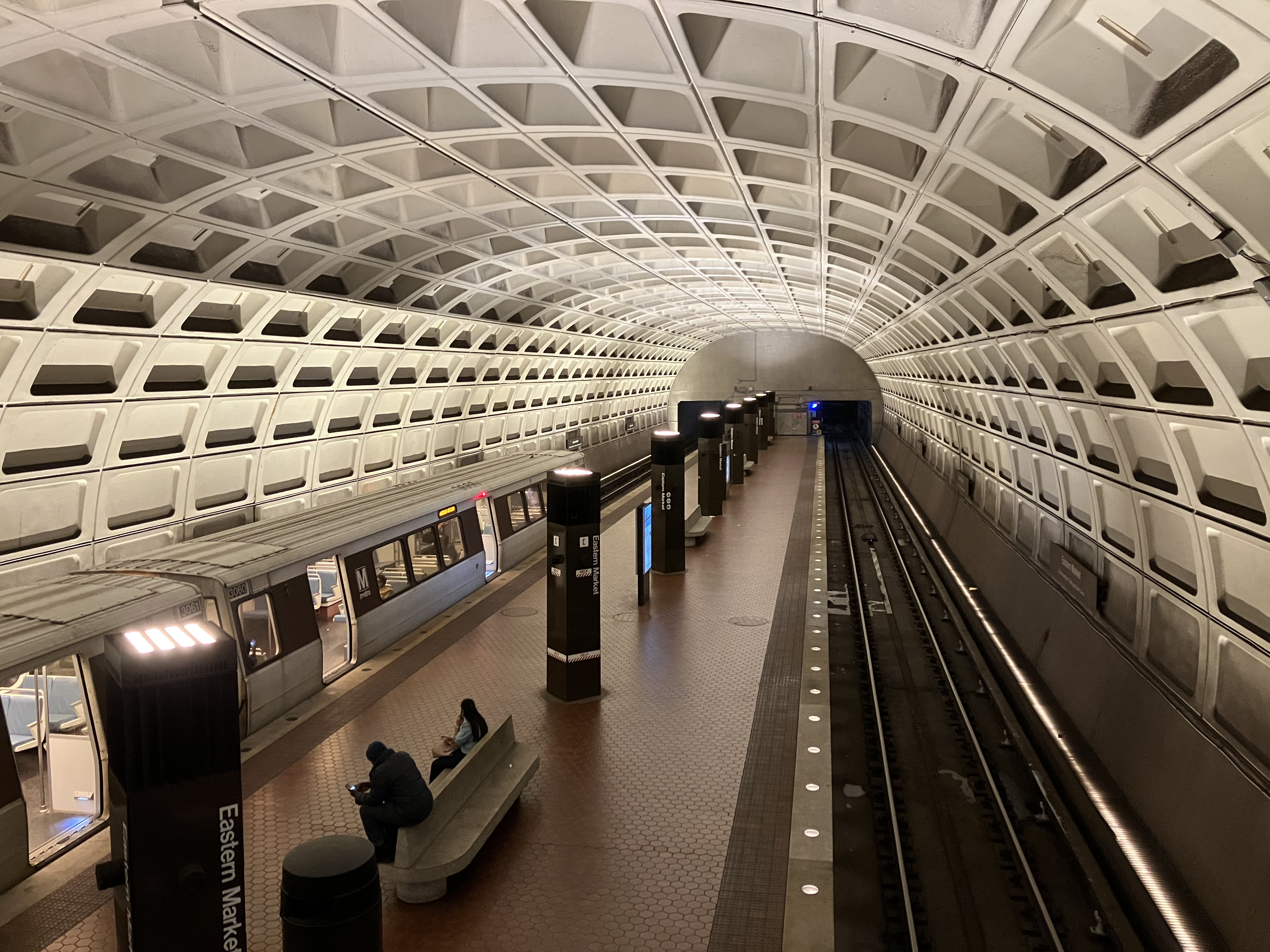
- Platform viewed from mezzanine in October 2022

General information
- Location: 701 Pennsylvania Avenue SE; Washington, D.C.
- Owner: Washington Metropolitan Area Transit Authority
- Platforms: 1 island platform
- Tracks: 2
- Connections: Metrobus: C53, C55, D10, D1X

Construction
- Structure type: Underground
- Cycle facilities: Capital Bikeshare, 20 lockers
- Accessible: Yes

Other information
- Station code: D06

History
- Opened: July 1, 1977; 49 years ago

Passengers
- 2025: 4,163 (average weekday)
- Rank: 43 of 98

Services
Preceding station	Washington Metro	Following station
Capitol South toward Vienna	Orange Line	Potomac Avenue toward New Carrollton
Capitol South toward Ashburn	Silver Line	Potomac Avenue toward Downtown Largo or New Carrollton
Capitol South toward Franconia–Springfield	Blue Line	Potomac Avenue toward Downtown Largo
Route map
Location

Eastern Market station is a Washington Metro station in the Capitol Hill neighborhood of Washington, D.C., United States. The island platformed station was opened on July 1, 1977, and is operated by the Washington Metropolitan Area Transit Authority (WMATA). The station currently provides service for the Blue, Orange, and Silver Lines. The station is located in Southeast D.C. at Pennsylvania Avenue and 7th Street. It is named after the nearby Eastern Market, a historic public marketplace.

== History ==
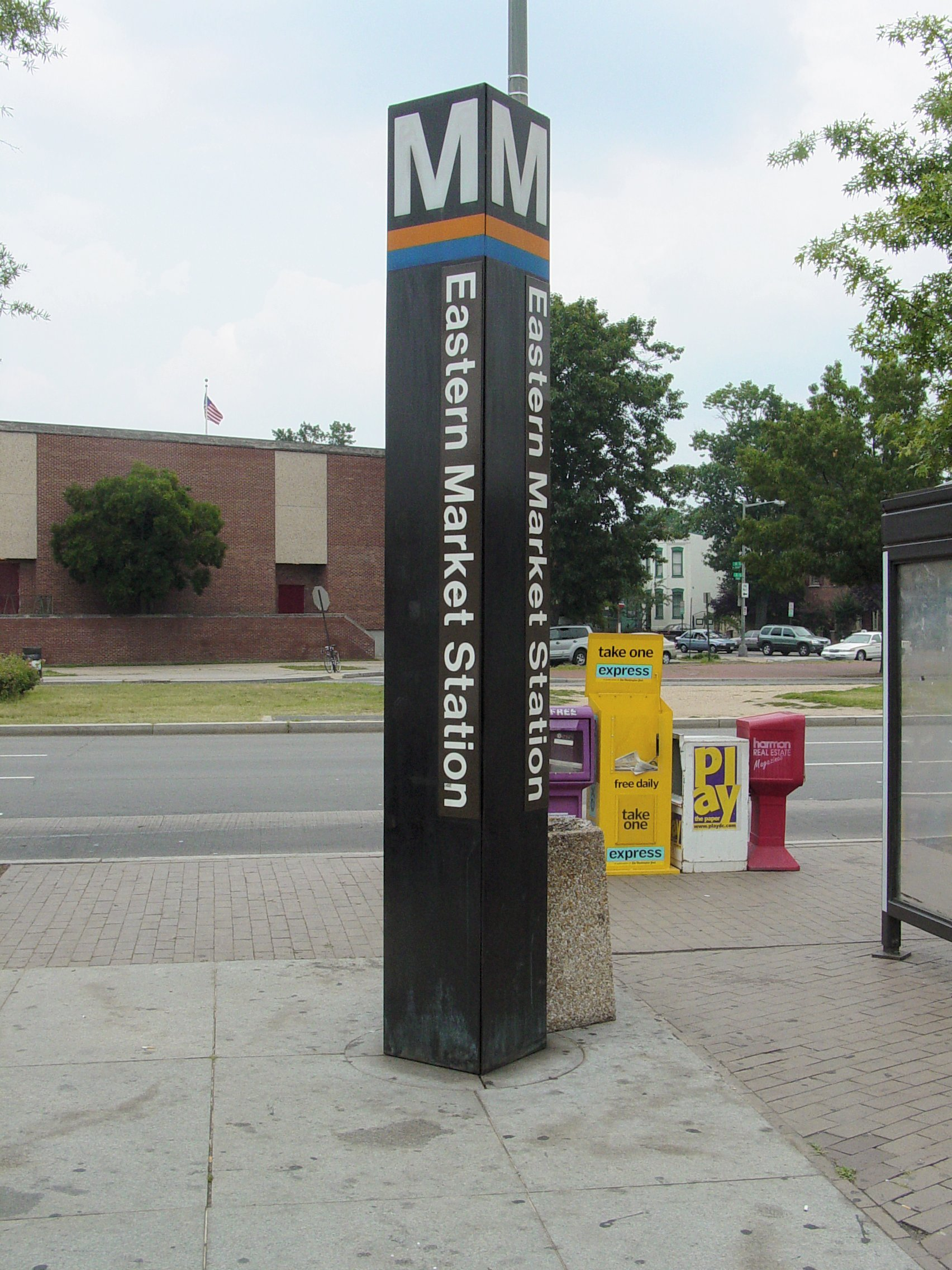
Station entrance pylon in July 2004

Originally, the station was to be named Marine Barracks, after the Washington Marine Barracks located a few blocks south of the station on 8th Street. However, after lobbying from the Capitol Hill Restoration Society, the name was changed to Eastern Market. The station opened on July 1, 1977. Its opening coincided with the completion of 11.8 miles (19.0 km) of rail between National Airport and RFK Stadium and the opening of an entire section of line, which included 16 stations in total, between the Ronald Reagan Washington National Airport and Stadium–Armory stations. Orange Line service to the station began upon the line's opening on November 20, 1978. Silver Line service at Eastern Market began on July 26, 2014.
