= Stadium–Armory station =

Washington Metro station

Stadium–Armory
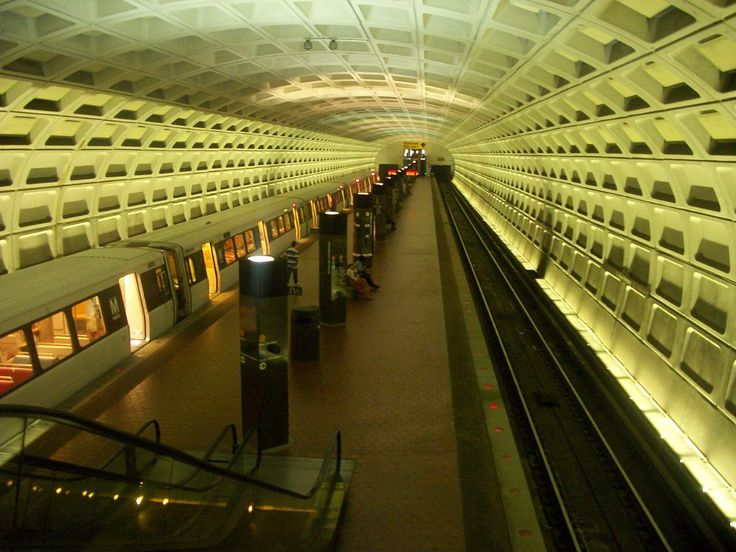
- Station platform from the mezzanine

General information
- Location: 192 19th Street SE; Washington, D.C.
- Coordinates: 38.8883°N 76.9771°W
- Owner: Washington Metropolitan Area Transit Authority
- Platforms: 1 island platform
- Tracks: 2
- Connections: Metrobus: C41, C51; OurBus; Anacostia Riverwalk Trail

Construction
- Structure type: Underground
- Cycle facilities: Capital Bikeshare, 20 racks
- Accessible: Yes

Other information
- Station code: D08

History
- Opened: July 1, 1977

Passengers
- 2025: 2,228 (average weekday)
- Rank: 74 of 98

Services
Preceding station	Washington Metro	Following station
Potomac Avenue toward Vienna	Orange Line	Minnesota Avenue toward New Carrollton
Potomac Avenue toward Ashburn	Silver Line	Minnesota Avenue toward New Carrollton
Potomac Avenue toward Ashburn	Silver Line	Benning Road toward Downtown Largo
Potomac Avenue toward Franconia–Springfield	Blue Line	Benning Road toward Downtown Largo
Route map
Location

Stadium–Armory station is a Washington Metro station in the Hill East neighborhood of Washington, D.C. The station opened on July 1, 1977, and is operated by the Washington Metropolitan Area Transit Authority (WMATA). Stadium–Armory serves the Blue, Orange, and Silver Lines. The station was named for its proximity to the former RFK Stadium and the D.C. Armory. Stadium–Armory is a transfer station, as this is the last station shared by the three lines before they diverge going east.

== Station layout ==
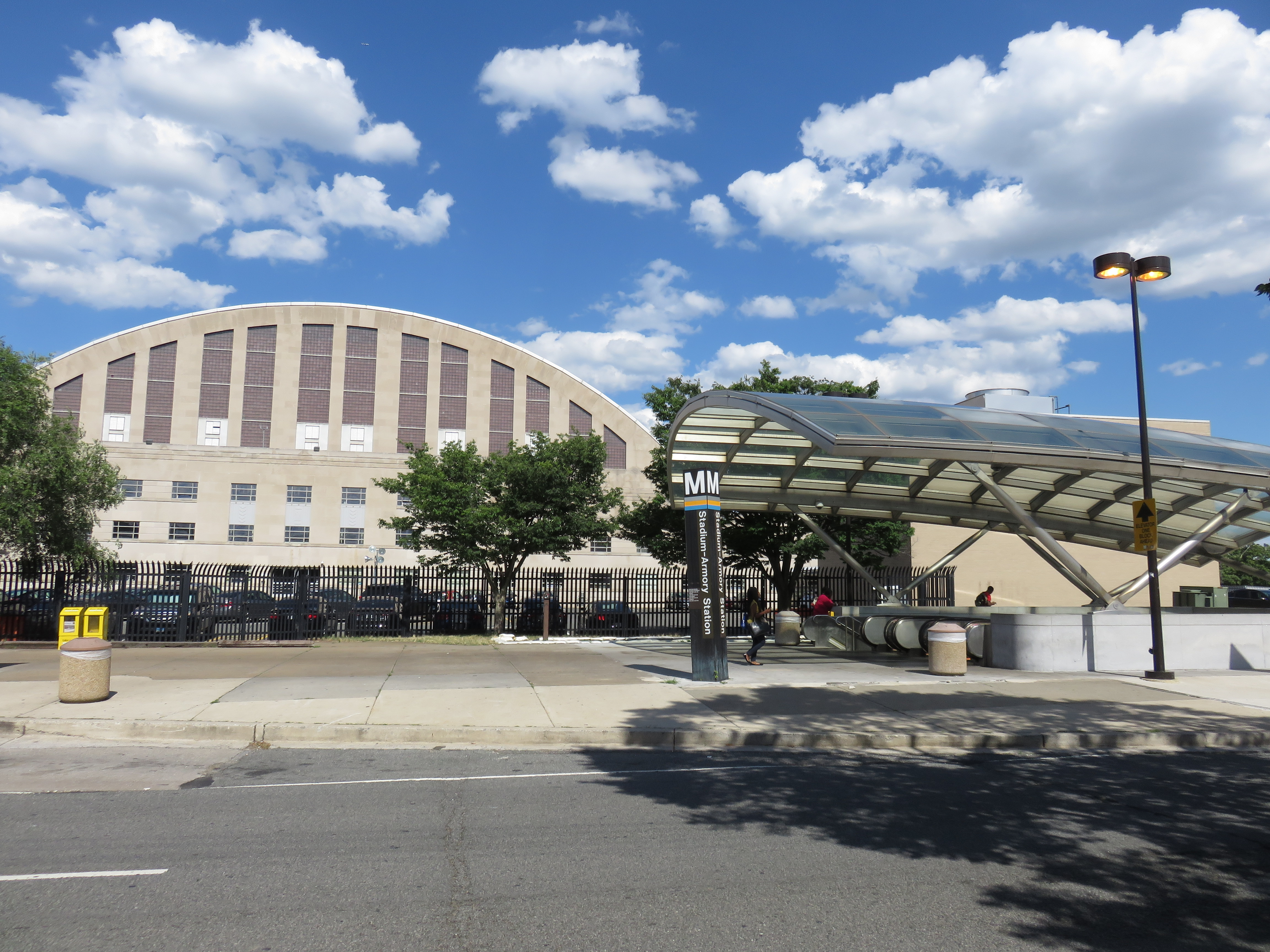
Northern entrance near the D.C. Armory

Stadium–Armory station serves the Hill East and Kingman Park neighborhoods. It has a single island platform with two tracks. Track D1 is for eastbound trains to New Carrollton or Largo and track D2 is for westbound trains to Vienna, Franconia–Springfield, or Ashburn. An indicator sign at the north end of the station flashes to inform passengers of the arriving train's destination, showing Orange and/or Silver for New Carrollton, and Blue and/or Silver for Largo. This feature is only used at final transfer stations; another example being Rosslyn. The station has two entrances along 19th Street SE; the north entrance at Independence Avenue and the south entrance between C & Burke Streets SE. Elevator access is at the south entrance.

Stadium-Armory is the last underground station for eastbound trains en route to New Carrollton. North of the station, the tracks rise onto an elevated structure above the RFK Campus parking lots and continue east across the Anacostia River. Beyond an elevated pocket track, the lines diverge at D&G Junction. The D Route, used by the Orange Line and some Silver Line service, continues northeast to New Carrolton. The G Route, used by the Blue Line and some Silver Line service, continues east to Downtown Largo entering a tunnel.

== History ==
=== 20th century ===
The station opened on July 1, 1977. Its opening coincided with the completion of 11.8 miles (19.0 km) of rail between National Airport and RFK Stadium. Orange Line service to the station began upon the line's opening on November 20, 1978.

In 1979, the D.C. Armory requested that the station name be changed to "Starplex" for the Stadium Armory Complex, but that request was ignored by the Metro Board. Stadium–Armory would also serve as the eastern terminus of the Blue Line from its opening through the opening of its extension to Addison Road on November 22, 1980.

=== 21st century ===
The station was supposed to be the Silver Line's eastern terminus, but in December 2012, due to safety concerns regarding a pocket track between this station and Minnesota Avenue and Benning Road, Metro officials decided to extend the line into nearby Prince George's County, Maryland to Largo, which is the eastern terminus of the Blue Line. Silver Line service at Stadium-Armory began on July 26, 2014.

A walking connection existed between Oklahoma Avenue station and Stadium Armory during DC Streetcar's operation.

Between May 28 and September 5, 2022, all Orange Line trains were terminating at Stadium–Armory station due to the Platform Improvement Project which closed stations north of Stadium–Armory station. On weekends, all Blue and Silver Line trains were terminating Stadium–Armory while Orange Line trains were cut back to Ballston–MU due to aerial structure repairs along the D route.

On September 21, 2015, a transformer caught fire near the station, causing severe delays. The reduced power as a result of the loss of the transformer caused WMATA to implement strategies to combat congestion in the system. This included having Orange and Silver line trains skip the Stadium–Armory station during rush hours, but service had been restored as of November.

In May 2026, WMATA plans to improve Stadium-Armory for the opening of New Stadium at RFK Campus in 2030. More escalators, elevators, and wider station entrances are planned.
