= Ashburn station (Washington Metro) =

Washington Metro station in Virginia, US

Ashburn
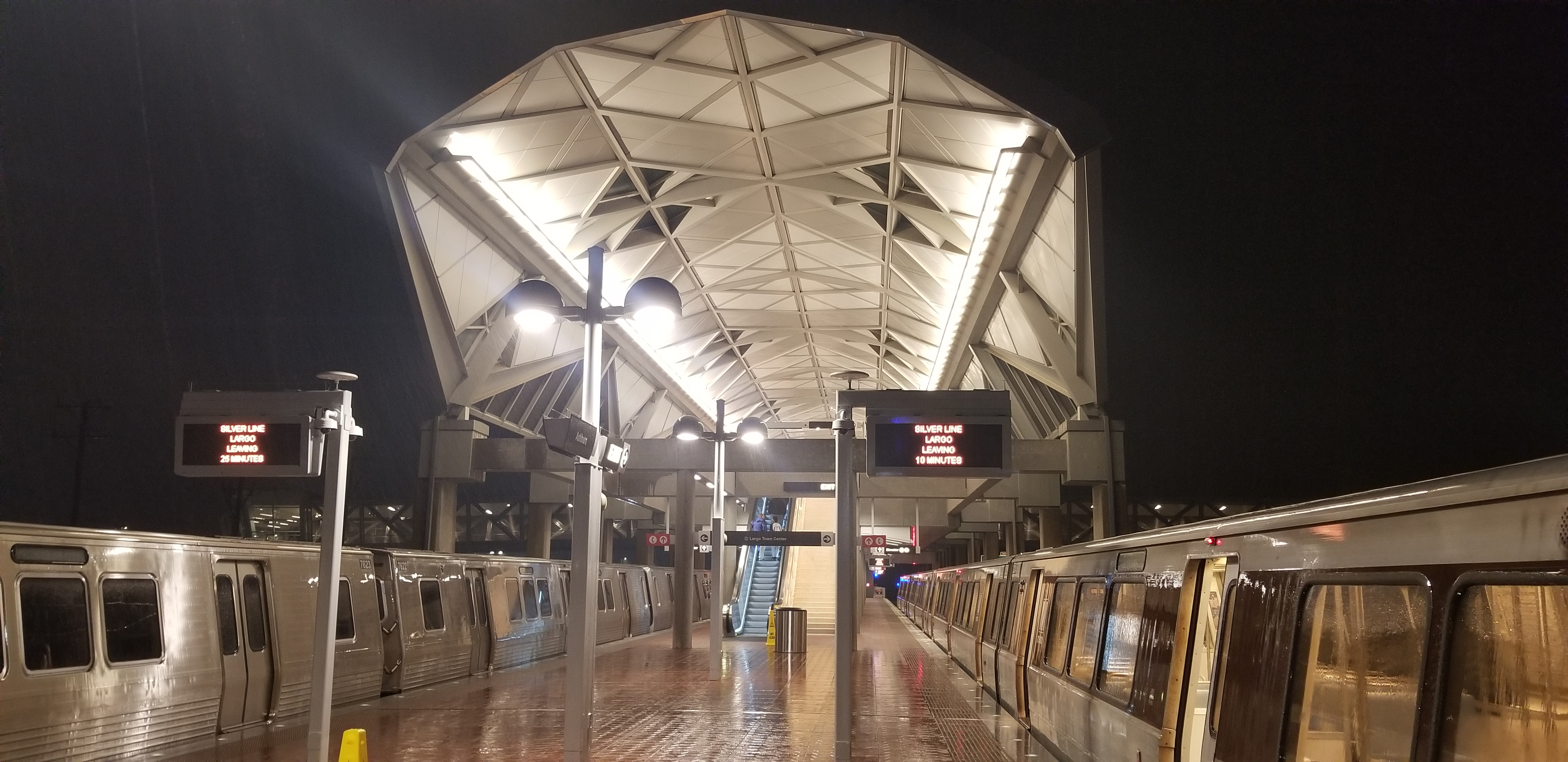
- The station's platform on opening day, November 15, 2022.

General information
- Location: 43655 Ashburn Metro Drive; Ashburn, Virginia
- Coordinates: 39°00′17″N 77°29′27″W
- Platforms: 1 island platform
- Tracks: 2
- Connections: Loudoun County Transit: 331, 332, 341, 342, 343, 344, 351, 371, 372, 373, 374, 375, 391

Construction
- Structure type: At-grade
- Parking: 3,300 spaces (Not constructed or operated by WMATA. North garage operated by Comstock Companies and south garage operated by Loudoun County)
- Cycle facilities: 51 racks, 5 lockers
- Accessible: Yes

Other information
- Station code: N12

History
- Opened: November 15, 2022; 4 years ago

Passengers
- 2025: 1,948 (average weekday)
- Rank: 78 of 98

Services
Preceding station	Washington Metro	Following station
Terminus	Silver Line	Loudoun Gateway toward Downtown Largo or New Carrollton
Route map
Location

Ashburn station is a Washington Metro station in Loudoun County, Virginia, United States, that serves as the western terminus of the Silver Line. Originally planned to begin operation in 2016, the station opened on November 15, 2022.

Ashburn station is located at the median of the Dulles Greenway (SR 267) east of Old Ryan Road (SR 772). It is the farthest station from downtown Washington. The station has two pedestrian bridges leading to either side of the Dulles Greenway, with bus bays and kiss and ride lots on both sides, as well as 1,650 parking spaces on each side. There are bicycle racks for both sides of the highway and five bike lockers for the north entrance.

== History ==
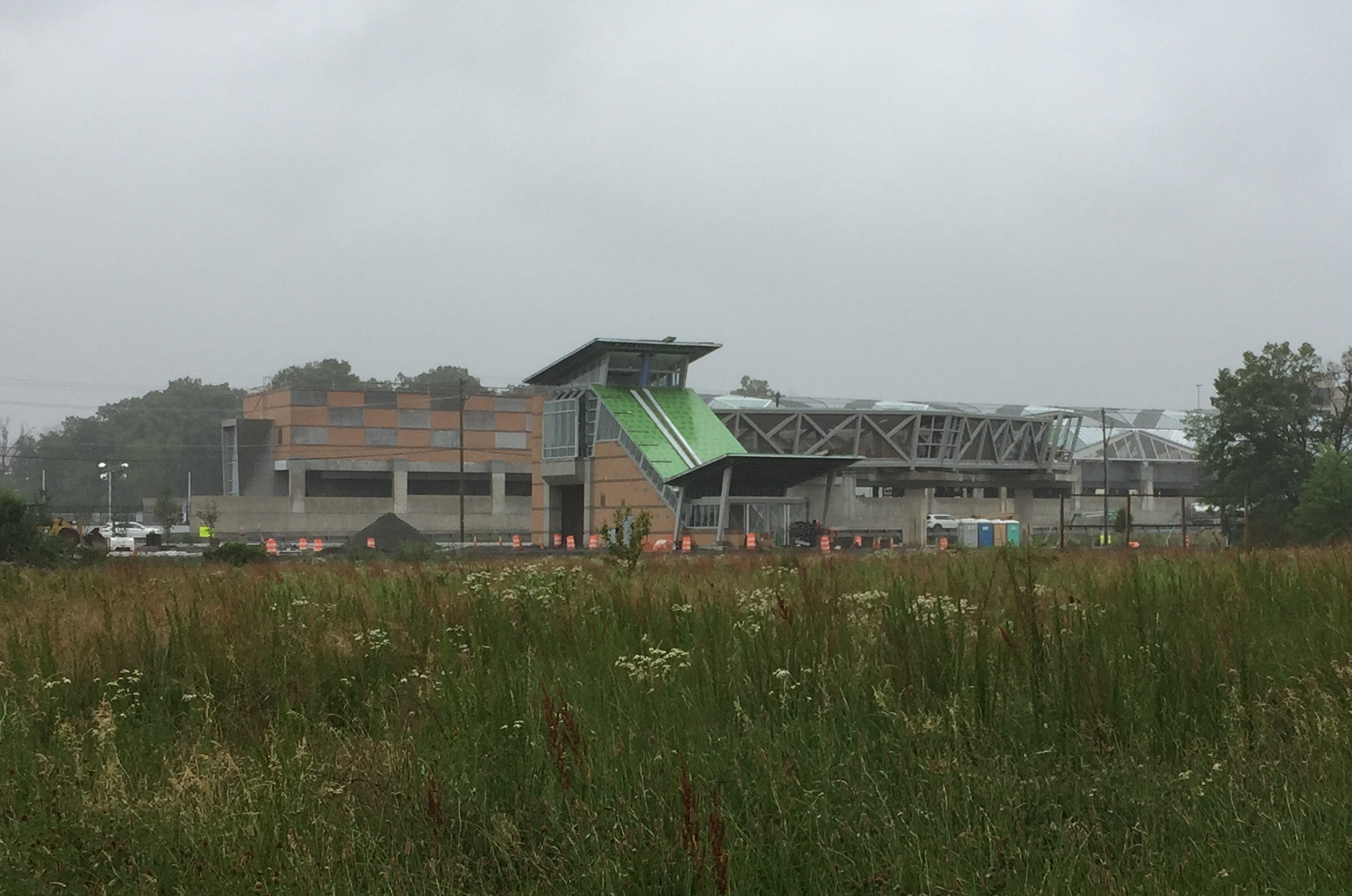
The station under construction in June 2019

The Silver Line was developed in the 21st century to link Washington, D.C., by rail to Washington Dulles International Airport and the edge cities of Tysons, Reston, Herndon, and Ashburn. It was built in two phases; the first phase, linking Washington, D.C., to Wiehle–Reston East, opened in 2014. The funding and planning of Phase 2 through Dulles Airport continued while Phase 1 was being constructed. In 2012, the Loudoun County Board of Supervisors voted 5 to 4 to extend the line to Dulles Airport and into the county. On April 25, 2013, the Phase 2 contract was issued at a cost of $1.177 billion.

In April 2015, project officials pushed back the opening date for the station to late 2019, stating that stricter requirements for stormwater management caused much of the delay. Per officials, the line also had to incorporate improvements to the system's automated train controls that were a late addition to the project's first phase. Around the same time as this announcement, the Washington Metropolitan Area Transit Authority (WMATA) approved the Loudoun County Board of Supervisors' name for the stop. The station was previously referred to as Route 772 in planning documents.

In August 2019, project officials reported that they expected construction on the second phase of the Silver Line to be completed by mid-2020. The opening date was postponed to early 2021, then to late 2021. In February 2021, Metro announced that it would need five months to test the Phase 2 extension. The Metropolitan Washington Airports Authority (MWAA) then announced that the Phase 2 extension should be substantially complete by Labor Day 2021, although MWAA subsequently missed this deadline.

MWAA declared the work on the rail line to be "substantially complete" in November 2021. However, WMATA estimated that it could take five months of testing and other preparations before passenger service could begin.

In June 2022, the Eastern Panhandle Transit Authority (EPTA) conducted a study to add commuter bus service to Ashburn. In 2025, the proposal was found "too costly".

Simulated service testing began operating along the Phase 2 tracks in October 2022. Phase 2 formally opened on November 15, 2022.
