= List of Washington Metro stations =

The Washington Metro (commonly called Metro and branded Metrorail) is a rapid transit system serving Washington, D.C. and neighboring communities in Maryland and Virginia, both inside and outside the Capital Beltway.

Like most rapid transit systems in the United States, ridership has not recovered from COVID-19 era collapses, falling from an average weekday ridership of 764,300 in the first quarter of 2015 to 519,700 in the fourth quarter of 2024. Nevertheless, the Washington Metro remains the second-busiest rapid transit system in the United States behind the New York City Subway. As of 2023, the system has 98 active stations on six lines with 129 miles (208 km) of tracks.

The Washington Metro system was conceived as an alternative to constructing a large freeway system throughout the Washington, D.C. area. It was partially financed with funds originally dedicated to highway construction. Construction began in 1969, and in 1976 the first section of the Metro system opened along the Red Line between the Farragut North and Rhode Island Avenue stations in Washington, D.C. Throughout the 1970s and 1980s, more stations were opened in the city and the suburban communities of Arlington County, the City of Alexandria, and Fairfax County in Virginia as well as Montgomery and Prince George's Counties in Maryland. By 1991, five rail lines were open: the Red, Orange, Yellow, Green, and Blue Lines. The system, as originally planned, was completed in 2001 with the extension of the Green Line to Branch Avenue. In 2004, three stations were opened: an extension of the Blue Line to the Morgan Boulevard and Downtown Largo stations and the first infill station, NoMa–Gallaudet U. The Silver Line opened in two phases, adding five stations in 2014 and six in 2022. On the Yellow and Blue Lines, an additional infill station at Potomac Yard opened on May 19, 2023.

Nine Metrorail stations are officially designated transfer stations, although other intermediate stations also allow passengers to transfer between lines. Four of these stations have separate, perpendicular upper and lower levels, which opened at different times. Two other transfer stations, Rosslyn and Pentagon, have parallel stacked platforms. Ten stations are termini (stations at the end of lines); several other non-terminus stations are used to short turn trains in regular service.

The busiest station in the system in 2023 was Metro Center, with more than 3.9 million passenger entries over the course of the year. Rosslyn was the busiest station in Virginia, while Silver Spring was the busiest in Maryland. The system's 10 busiest stations are all located in Washington.

== Lines ==
There are six Washington Metro lines, each named for a different color. All lines except the Red Line share tracks.

Line	Stations	Termini	
Red Line (Washington Metro)	27	Shady Grove	Glenmont
Yellow Line (Washington Metro)	22	Huntington	Mount Vernon Square, Greenbelt
Green Line (Washington Metro)	21	Branch Avenue	Greenbelt
Orange Line (Washington Metro)	26	Vienna	New Carrollton
Silver Line (Washington Metro)	34	Ashburn	Downtown Largo, New Carrollton
Blue Line (Washington Metro)	28	Franconia–Springfield	Downtown Largo

== Stations ==
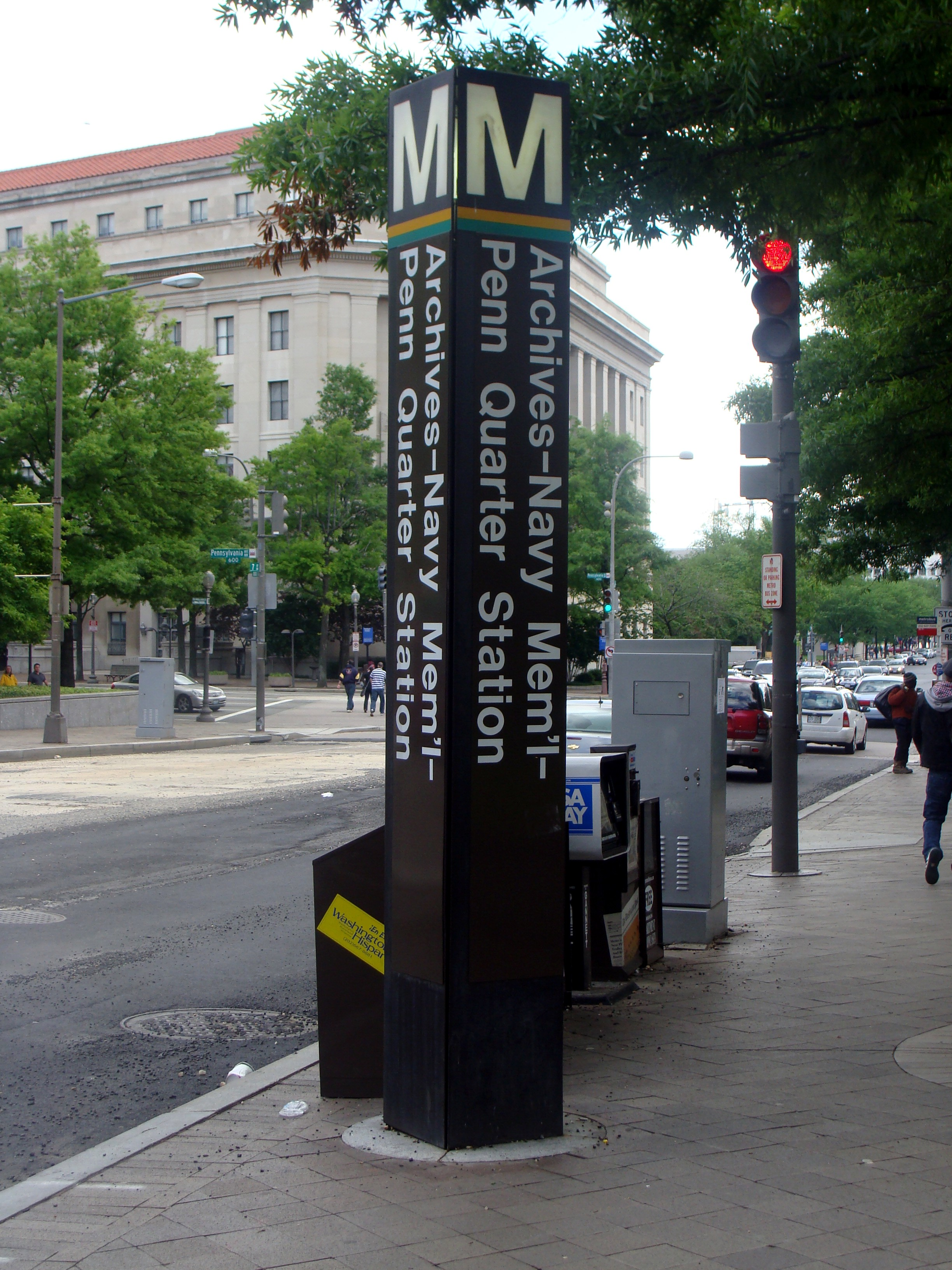
Pylon by the entrance to the Archives station

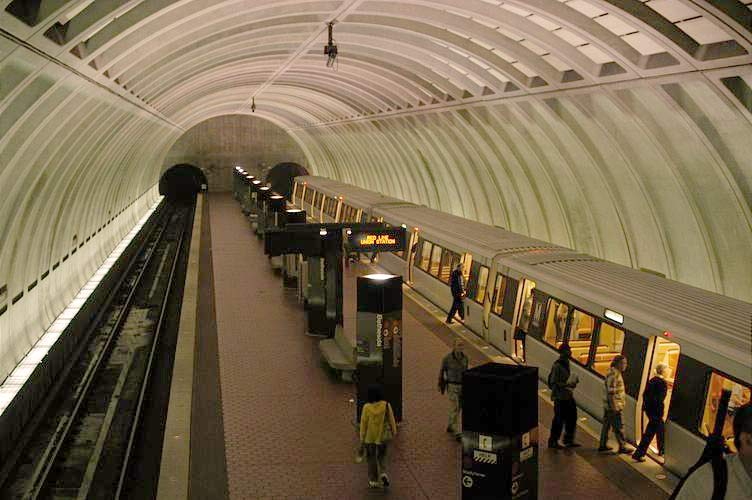
Passengers boarding a train at the Bethesda station

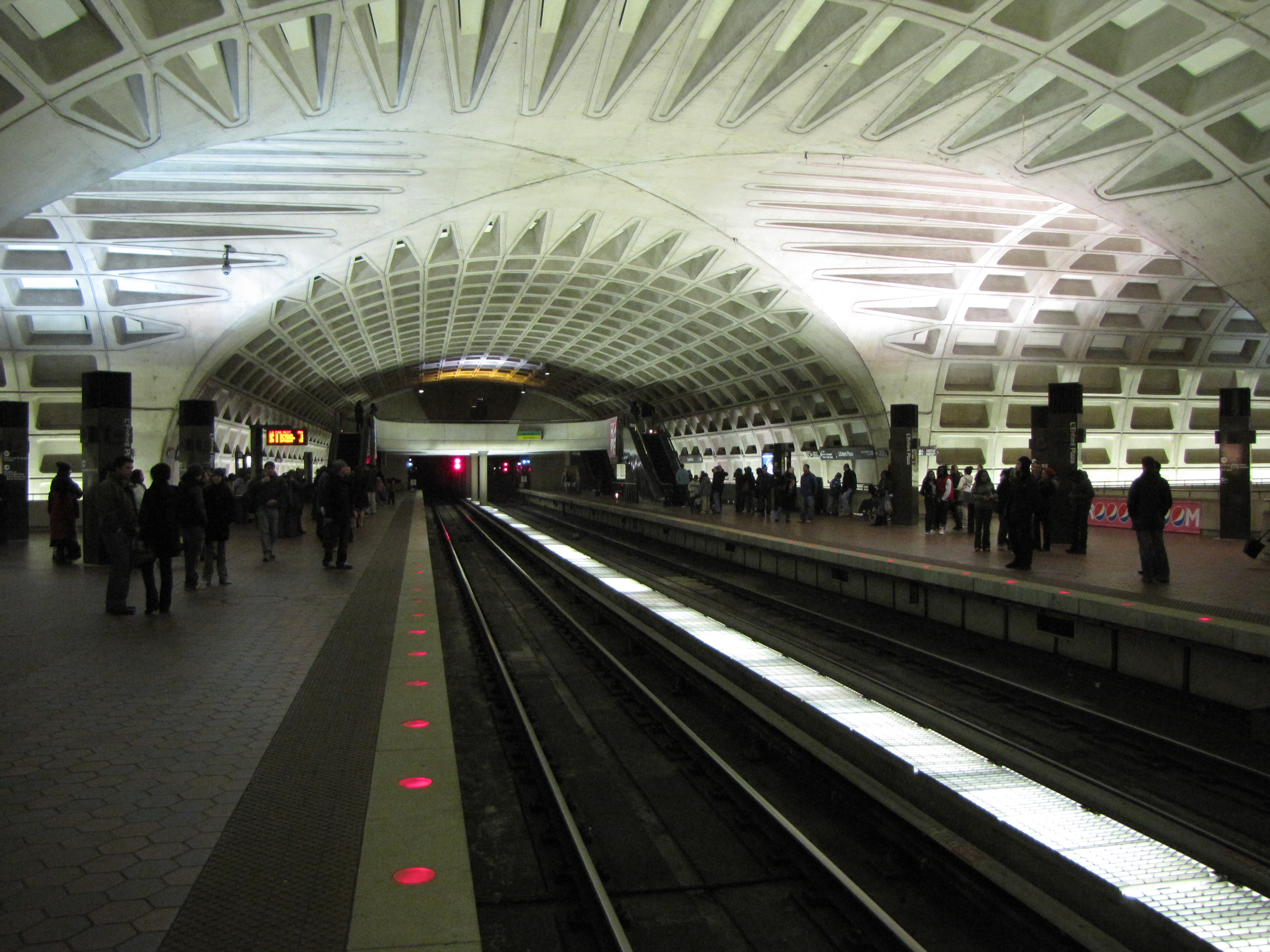
Crossvault of the L'Enfant Plaza station

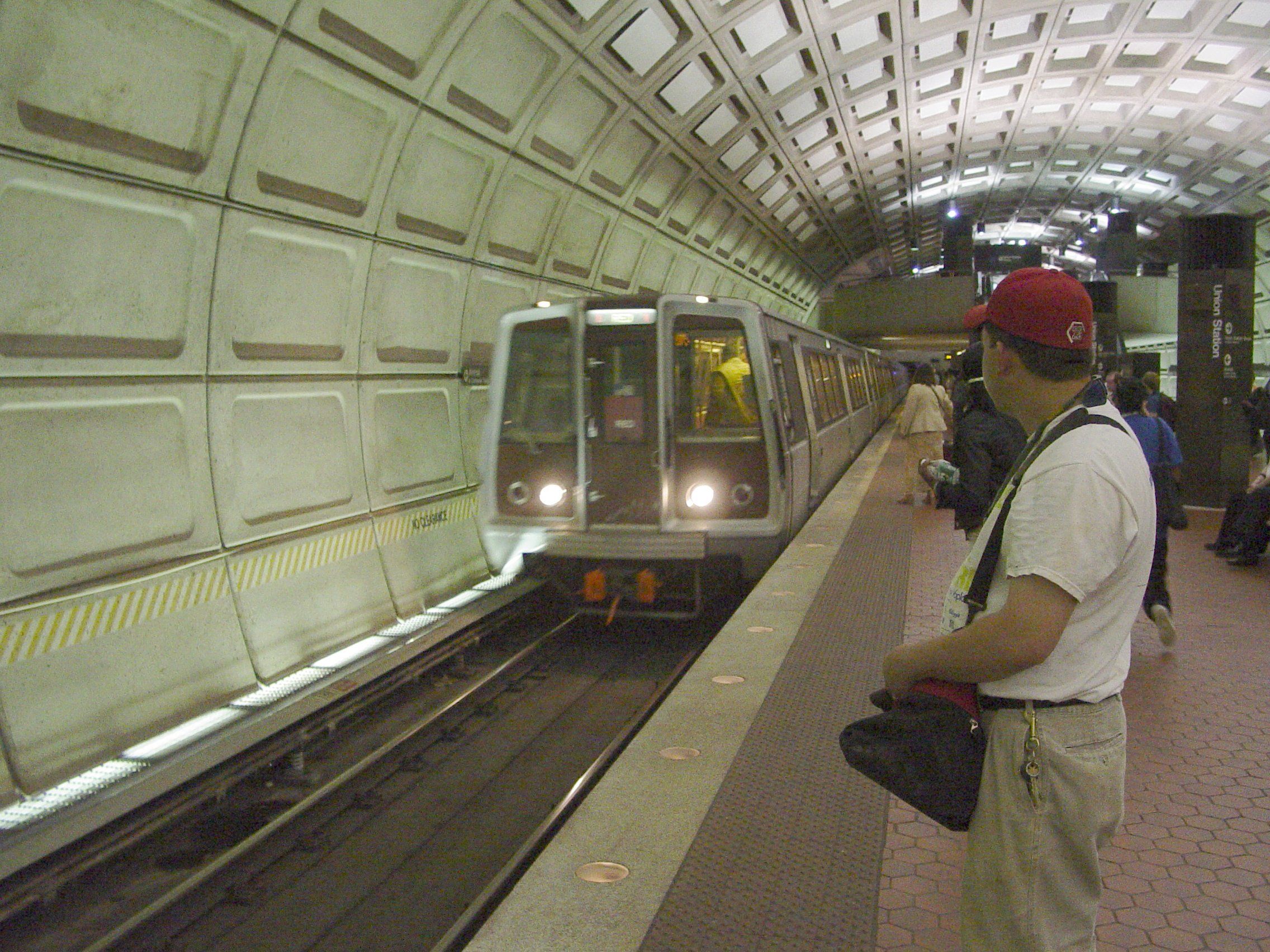
Union Station, the busiest station in the system

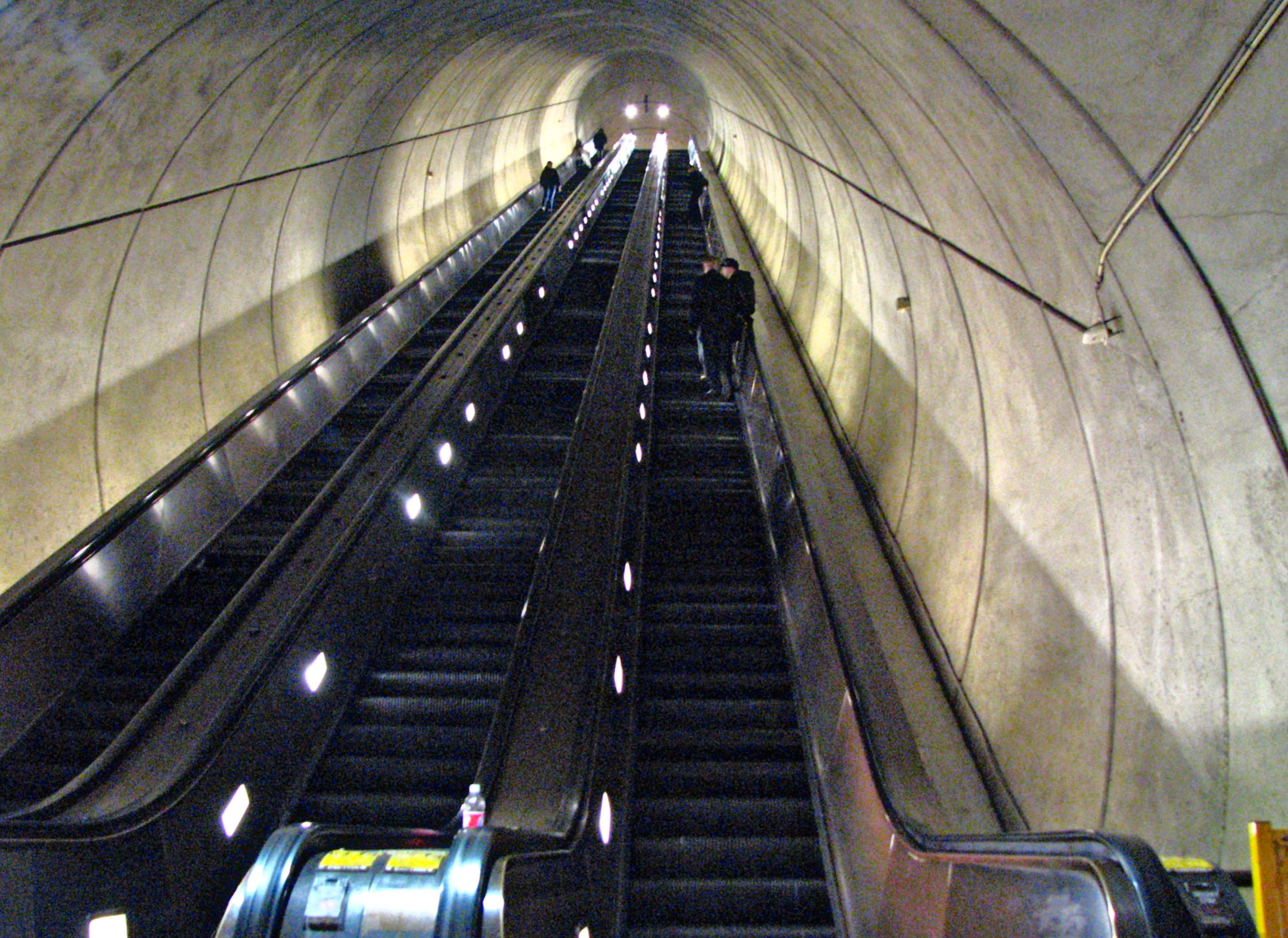
The longest continuous escalator in the western hemisphere, at the Wheaton station

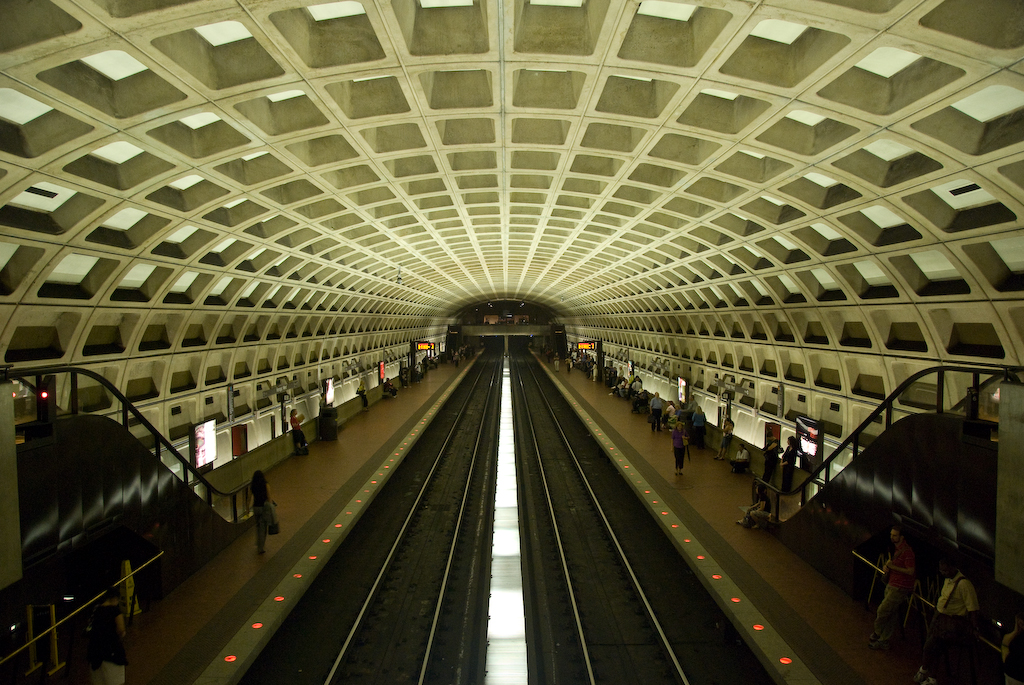
Vaulted ceiling at Farragut West

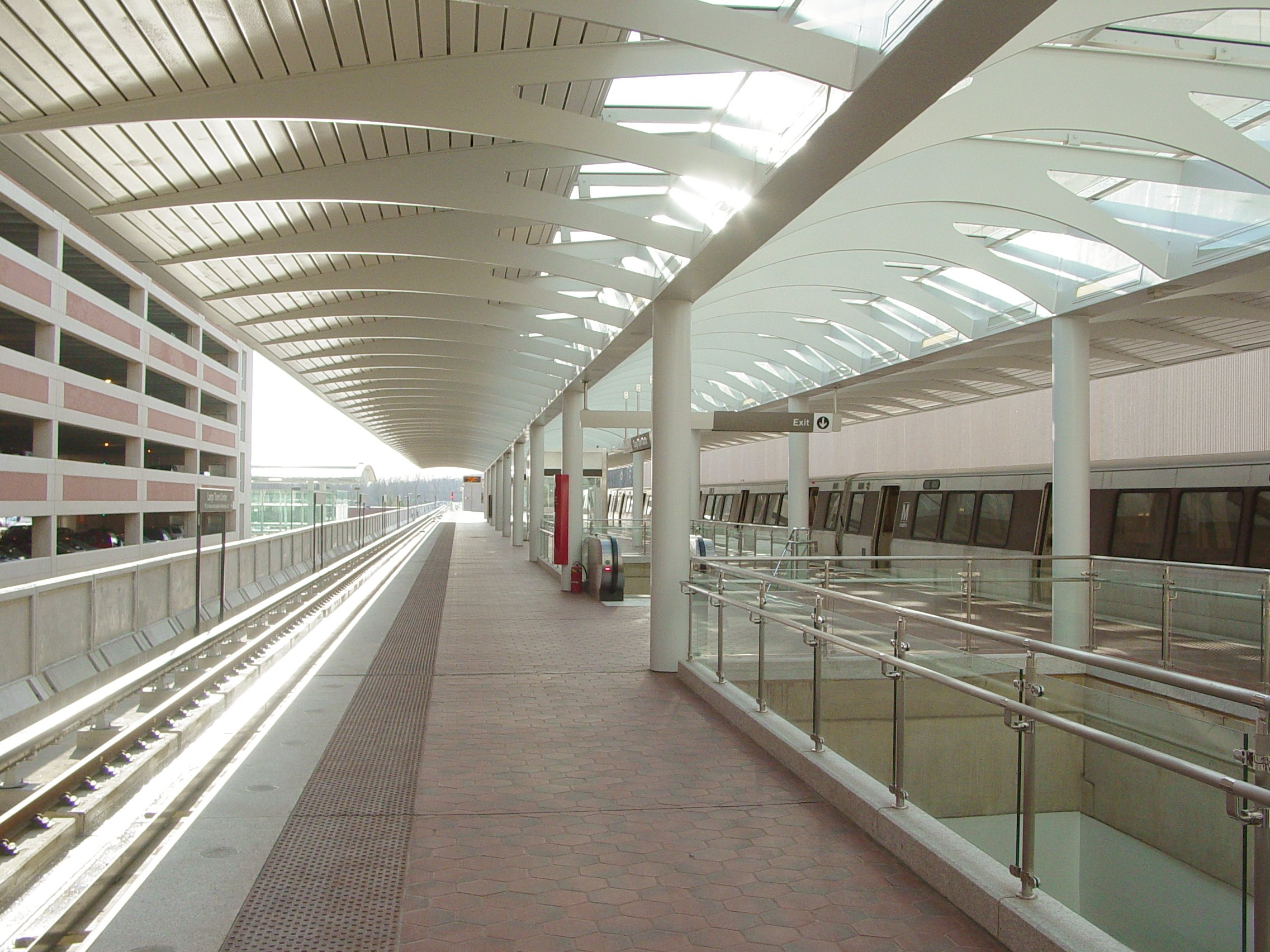
Downtown Largo station, one of the newest stations

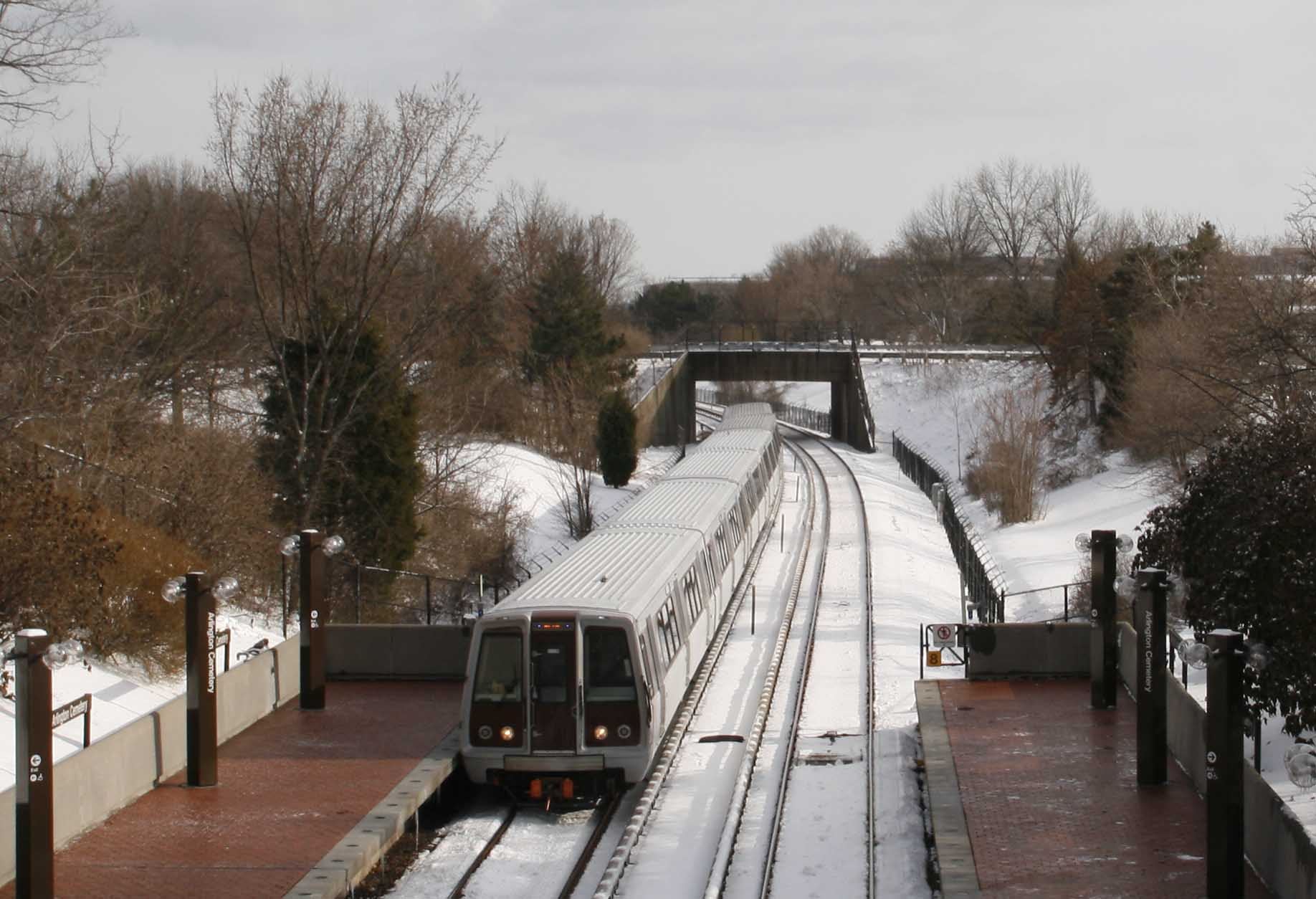
Arlington Cemetery station on a snowy day

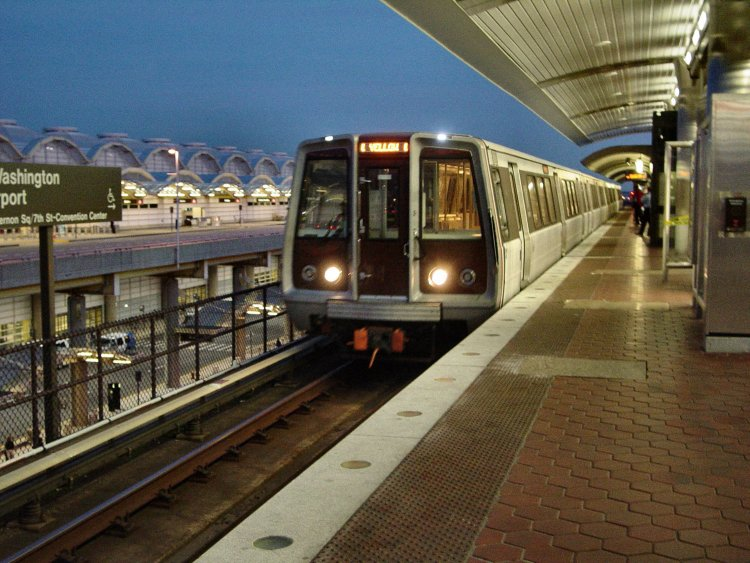
Elevated platform at National Airport

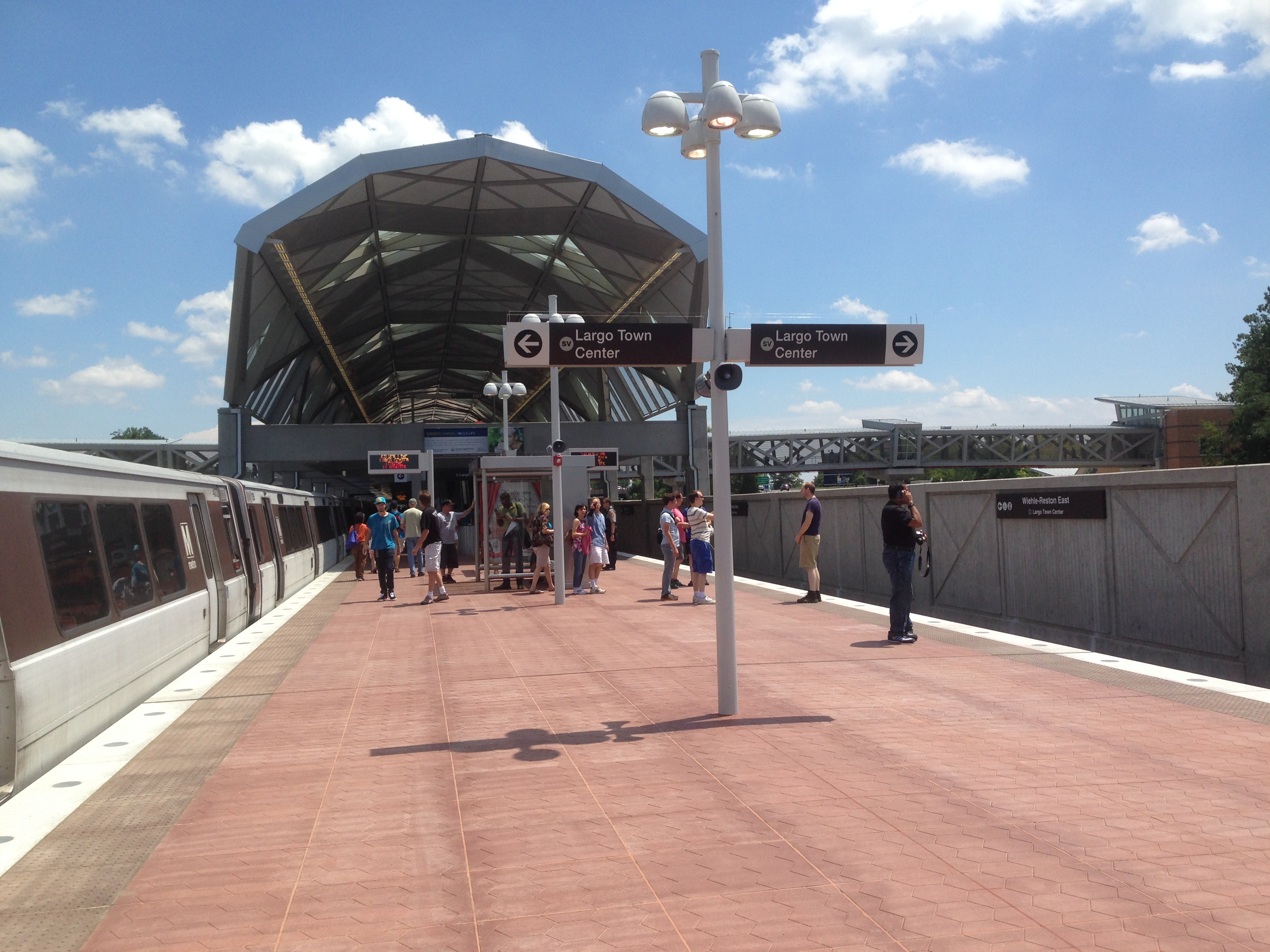
Wiehle-Reston East station on the first day of Silver Line service in 2014

*	Official transfer stations
†	Terminals
*†	Transfer station and terminal

Station	Lines	Connections	Jurisdiction	Avg. Weekday Daily Rail Entries (2025)	Opened
Addison Road	Silver Line (Washington Metro) Blue Line (Washington Metro)	—N/a	Prince George's County, Maryland	1,667	Nov 22, 1980
Anacostia	Green Line (Washington Metro)	—N/a	District of Columbia	4,429	Dec 28, 1991
Archives	Yellow Line (Washington Metro) Green Line (Washington Metro)	—N/a	District of Columbia	4,891	Apr 30, 1983
Arlington Cemetery	Blue Line (Washington Metro)	—N/a	Arlington County, Virginia	948	Jul 1, 1977
Ashburn†	Silver Line (Washington Metro)	—N/a	Loudoun County, Virginia	1,443	Nov 15, 2022
Ballston–MU	Orange Line (Washington Metro) Silver Line (Washington Metro)	—N/a	Arlington County, Virginia	5,975	Dec 11, 1979
Benning Road	Silver Line (Washington Metro) Blue Line (Washington Metro)	—N/a	District of Columbia	2,092	Nov 22, 1980
Bethesda	Red Line (Washington Metro)	Purple Line (under construction)	Montgomery County, Maryland	5,072	Aug 25, 1984
Braddock Road	Yellow Line (Washington Metro) Blue Line (Washington Metro)	A1X BRT	Alexandria, Virginia	2,398	Dec 17, 1983
Branch Avenue†	Green Line (Washington Metro)	—N/a	Prince George's County, Maryland	2,772	Jan 13, 2001
Brookland–CUA	Red Line (Washington Metro)	—N/a	District of Columbia	4,495	Feb 6, 1978
Capitol Heights	Silver Line (Washington Metro) Blue Line (Washington Metro)	—N/a	Prince George's County, Maryland	1,484	Nov 22, 1980
Capitol South	Orange Line (Washington Metro) Silver Line (Washington Metro) Blue Line (Washington Metro)	—N/a	District of Columbia	5,246	Jul 1, 1977
Cheverly	Orange Line (Washington Metro) Silver Line (Washington Metro)	—N/a	Prince George's County, Maryland	599	Nov 20, 1978
Clarendon	Orange Line (Washington Metro) Silver Line (Washington Metro)	—N/a	Arlington County, Virginia	2,941	Dec 11, 1979
Cleveland Park	Red Line (Washington Metro)	—N/a	District of Columbia	2,443	Dec 5, 1981
College Park–University of Maryland	Yellow Line (Washington Metro) Green Line (Washington Metro)	MARC: Camden; Purple Line (under construction)	Prince George's County, Maryland	2,187	Dec 11, 1993
Columbia Heights	Yellow Line (Washington Metro) Green Line (Washington Metro)	—N/a	District of Columbia	8,403	Sep 18, 1999
Congress Heights	Green Line (Washington Metro)	—N/a	District of Columbia	1,948	Jan 13, 2001
Court House	Orange Line (Washington Metro) Silver Line (Washington Metro)	—N/a	Arlington County, Virginia	3,842	Dec 11, 1979
Crystal City	Yellow Line (Washington Metro) Blue Line (Washington Metro)	VRE: Fredericksburg Manassas (at Crystal City); A1X BRT	Arlington County, Virginia	5,380	Jul 1, 1977
Deanwood	Orange Line (Washington Metro) Silver Line (Washington Metro)	—N/a	District of Columbia	1,172	Nov 20, 1978
Downtown Largo†	Silver Line (Washington Metro) Blue Line (Washington Metro)	—N/a	Prince George's County, Maryland	2,480	Dec 18, 2004
Dunn Loring	Orange Line (Washington Metro)	—N/a	Fairfax County, Virginia	1,755	Jun 7, 1986
Dupont Circle	Red Line (Washington Metro)	—N/a	District of Columbia	10,424	Jan 17, 1977
East Falls Church*	Orange Line (Washington Metro) Silver Line (Washington Metro)	—N/a	Arlington County, Virginia	2,619	Jun 7, 1986
Eastern Market	Orange Line (Washington Metro) Silver Line (Washington Metro) Blue Line (Washington Metro)	—N/a	District of Columbia	3,859	Jul 1, 1977
Eisenhower Avenue	Yellow Line (Washington Metro)	—N/a	Alexandria, Virginia	1,386	Dec 17, 1983
Farragut North	Red Line (Washington Metro)	—N/a	District of Columbia	11,111	Mar 29, 1976
Farragut West	Orange Line (Washington Metro) Silver Line (Washington Metro) Blue Line (Washington Metro)	—N/a	District of Columbia	10,137	Jul 1, 1977
Federal Center SW	Orange Line (Washington Metro) Silver Line (Washington Metro) Blue Line (Washington Metro)	—N/a	District of Columbia	2,669	Jul 1, 1977
Federal Triangle	Orange Line (Washington Metro) Silver Line (Washington Metro) Blue Line (Washington Metro)	—N/a	District of Columbia	4,325	Jul 1, 1977
Foggy Bottom–GWU	Orange Line (Washington Metro) Silver Line (Washington Metro) Blue Line (Washington Metro)	—N/a	District of Columbia	13,724	Jul 1, 1977
Forest Glen	Red Line (Washington Metro)	—N/a	Montgomery County, Maryland	1,193	Sep 22, 1990
Fort Totten* (upper level)^{[a]}	Red Line (Washington Metro)	—N/a	District of Columbia	7,186	Feb 6, 1978
Fort Totten* (lower level)^{[a]}	Yellow Line (Washington Metro) Green Line (Washington Metro)	—N/a	District of Columbia	7,186	Dec 11, 1993
Franconia–Springfield*†	Blue Line (Washington Metro)	VRE: Fredericksburg	Fairfax County, Virginia	3,320	Jun 29, 1997
Friendship Heights	Red Line (Washington Metro)	—N/a	District of Columbia	4,044	Aug 25, 1984
Gallery Place* (upper level)^{[a]}	Red Line (Washington Metro)	—N/a	District of Columbia	13,006	Dec 15, 1976
Gallery Place* (lower level)^{[a]}	Yellow Line (Washington Metro) Green Line (Washington Metro)	—N/a	District of Columbia	13,006	Apr 30, 1983
Georgia Avenue–Petworth	Yellow Line (Washington Metro) Green Line (Washington Metro)	—N/a	District of Columbia	4,641	Sep 18, 1999
Glenmont†	Red Line (Washington Metro)	—N/a	Montgomery County, Maryland	3,020	Jul 25, 1998
Greenbelt*†	Yellow Line (Washington Metro) Green Line (Washington Metro)	MARC: Camden	Prince George's County, Maryland	3,191	Dec 11, 1993
Greensboro	Silver Line (Washington Metro)	—N/a	Fairfax County, Virginia	1,009	Jul 26, 2014
Grosvenor–Strathmore	Red Line (Washington Metro)	—N/a	Montgomery County, Maryland	2,515	Aug 25, 1984
Herndon	Silver Line (Washington Metro)	—N/a	Fairfax County, Virginia	959	Nov 15, 2022
Huntington†	Yellow Line (Washington Metro)	—N/a	Fairfax County, Virginia	3,618	Dec 17, 1983
Hyattsville Crossing	Yellow Line (Washington Metro) Green Line (Washington Metro)	—N/a	Prince George's County, Maryland	3,092	Dec 11, 1993
Innovation Center	Silver Line (Washington Metro)	—N/a	Fairfax County, Virginia	871	Nov 15, 2022
Judiciary Square	Red Line (Washington Metro)	—N/a	District of Columbia	3,999	Mar 29, 1976
King Street–Old Town*	Yellow Line (Washington Metro) Blue Line (Washington Metro)	Amtrak services: Cardinal; Carolinian; Crescent; Floridian; Northeast Regional; Palmetto; Silver Meteor; VRE: Fredericksburg Manassas (at Alexandria Union Station)	Alexandria, Virginia	4,006	Dec 17, 1983
L'Enfant Plaza* (upper level)^{[a]}	Yellow Line (Washington Metro) Green Line (Washington Metro)	VRE: Fredericksburg Manassas (at L'Enfant)	District of Columbia	11,023	Apr 30, 1983
L'Enfant Plaza* (lower level)^{[a]}	Orange Line (Washington Metro) Silver Line (Washington Metro) Blue Line (Washington Metro)	VRE: Fredericksburg Manassas (at L'Enfant)	District of Columbia	11,023	Jul 1, 1977
Landover	Orange Line (Washington Metro) Silver Line (Washington Metro)	—N/a	Prince George's County, Maryland	1,069	Nov 20, 1978
Loudoun Gateway	Silver Line (Washington Metro)	—N/a	Loudoun County, Virginia	325	Nov 15, 2022
McLean	Silver Line (Washington Metro)	—N/a	Fairfax County, Virginia	1,968	Jul 26, 2014
McPherson Square	Orange Line (Washington Metro) Silver Line (Washington Metro) Blue Line (Washington Metro)	—N/a	District of Columbia	7,434	Jul 1, 1977
Medical Center	Red Line (Washington Metro)	—N/a	Montgomery County, Maryland	3,132	Aug 25, 1984
Metro Center* (upper level)^{[a]}	Red Line (Washington Metro)	—N/a	District of Columbia	14,051	Mar 29, 1976
Metro Center* (lower level)^{[a]}	Orange Line (Washington Metro) Silver Line (Washington Metro) Blue Line (Washington Metro)	—N/a	District of Columbia	14,051	Jul 1, 1977
Minnesota Avenue	Orange Line (Washington Metro) Silver Line (Washington Metro)	—N/a	District of Columbia	1,859	Nov 20, 1978
Morgan Boulevard	Silver Line (Washington Metro) Blue Line (Washington Metro)	—N/a	Prince George's County, Maryland	1,094	Dec 18, 2004
Mount Vernon Square*†	Yellow Line (Washington Metro) Green Line (Washington Metro)	—N/a	District of Columbia	3,717	May 11, 1991
Navy Yard–Ballpark	Green Line (Washington Metro)	—N/a	District of Columbia	8,750	Dec 28, 1991
Naylor Road	Green Line (Washington Metro)	—N/a	Prince George's County, Maryland	1,411	Jan 13, 2001
New Carrollton*†	Orange Line (Washington Metro) Silver Line (Washington Metro)	Amtrak: Northeast Regional, Palmetto, Vermonter; MARC: Penn; Purple Line (under construction)	Prince George's County, Maryland	3,491	Nov 20, 1978
NoMa–Gallaudet U	Red Line (Washington Metro)	—N/a	District of Columbia	10,155	Nov 20, 2004
North Bethesda	Red Line (Washington Metro)	—N/a	Montgomery County, Maryland	2,136	Dec 15, 1984
Pentagon*	Yellow Line (Washington Metro) Blue Line (Washington Metro)	—N/a	Arlington County, Virginia	8,073	Jul 1, 1977
Pentagon City	Yellow Line (Washington Metro) Blue Line (Washington Metro)	A1X BRT	Arlington County, Virginia	7,769	Jul 1, 1977
Potomac Avenue	Orange Line (Washington Metro) Silver Line (Washington Metro) Blue Line (Washington Metro)	—N/a	District of Columbia	2,647	Jul 1, 1977
Potomac Yard	Yellow Line (Washington Metro) Blue Line (Washington Metro)	A1X BRT	Alexandria, Virginia	1,342	May 19, 2023
Reston Town Center	Silver Line (Washington Metro)	—N/a	Fairfax County, Virginia	928	Nov 15, 2022
Rhode Island Avenue	Red Line (Washington Metro)	—N/a	District of Columbia	4,648	Mar 29, 1976
Rockville	Red Line (Washington Metro)	Amtrak: Floridian; MARC: Brunswick	Montgomery County, Maryland	2,466	Dec 15, 1984
Ronald Reagan Washington; National Airport	Yellow Line (Washington Metro) Blue Line (Washington Metro)	Reagan National Airport	Arlington County, Virginia	5,622	Jul 1, 1977
Rosslyn*	Orange Line (Washington Metro) Silver Line (Washington Metro) Blue Line (Washington Metro)	—N/a	Arlington County, Virginia	7,663	Jul 1, 1977
Shady Grove†	Red Line (Washington Metro)	—N/a	Montgomery County, Maryland	6,043	Dec 15, 1984
Shaw–Howard University	Yellow Line (Washington Metro) Green Line (Washington Metro)	—N/a	District of Columbia	3,638	May 11, 1991
Silver Spring	Red Line (Washington Metro)	MARC: Brunswick; Flash BRT: Blue, Orange; Purple Line (under construction)	Montgomery County, Maryland	5,843	Feb 6, 1978
Smithsonian	Orange Line (Washington Metro) Silver Line (Washington Metro) Blue Line (Washington Metro)	—N/a	District of Columbia	5,522	Jul 1, 1977
Southern Avenue	Green Line (Washington Metro)	—N/a	Prince George's County, Maryland	2,989	Jan 13, 2001
Spring Hill	Silver Line (Washington Metro)	—N/a	Fairfax County, Virginia	712	Jul 26, 2014
Stadium–Armory*	Orange Line (Washington Metro) Silver Line (Washington Metro) Blue Line (Washington Metro)	—N/a	District of Columbia	2,036	Jul 1, 1977
Suitland	Green Line (Washington Metro)	—N/a	Prince George's County, Maryland	2,730	Jan 13, 2001
Takoma	Red Line (Washington Metro)	—N/a	District of Columbia	3,673	Feb 6, 1978
Tenleytown–AU	Red Line (Washington Metro)	—N/a	District of Columbia	4,125	Aug 25, 1984
Twinbrook	Red Line (Washington Metro)	—N/a	Montgomery County, Maryland	2,439	Dec 15, 1984
Tysons	Silver Line (Washington Metro)	—N/a	Fairfax County, Virginia	2,192	Jul 26, 2014
U Street	Yellow Line (Washington Metro) Green Line (Washington Metro)	—N/a	District of Columbia	4,900	May 11, 1991
Union Station	Red Line (Washington Metro)	Amtrak services: Acela; Cardinal; Carolinian; Crescent; Floridian; Northeast Regional; Palmetto; Silver Meteor; Vermonter; MARC: Brunswick Camden Penn; VRE: Fredericksburg Manassas; (at Union Station)	District of Columbia	14,831	Mar 29, 1976
Van Dorn Street	Blue Line (Washington Metro)	—N/a	Alexandria, Virginia	1,474	Jun 15, 1991
Van Ness–UDC	Red Line (Washington Metro)	—N/a	District of Columbia	3,364	Dec 5, 1981
Vienna†	Orange Line (Washington Metro)	—N/a	Fairfax County, Virginia	3,859	Jun 7, 1986
Virginia Square–GMU	Orange Line (Washington Metro) Silver Line (Washington Metro)	—N/a	Arlington County, Virginia	2,260	Dec 11, 1979
Washington Dulles International Airport	Silver Line (Washington Metro)	Dulles International Airport	Loudoun County, Virginia	2,189	Nov 15, 2022
Waterfront	Green Line (Washington Metro)	—N/a	District of Columbia	3,710	Dec 28, 1991
West Falls Church	Orange Line (Washington Metro)	—N/a	Fairfax County, Virginia	1,340	Jun 7, 1986
West Hyattsville	Yellow Line (Washington Metro) Green Line (Washington Metro)	—N/a	Prince George's County, Maryland	2,497	Dec 11, 1993
Wheaton	Red Line (Washington Metro)	—N/a	Montgomery County, Maryland	1,986	Sep 22, 1990
Wiehle–Reston East	Silver Line (Washington Metro)	—N/a	Fairfax County, Virginia	1,714	Jul 26, 2014
Woodley Park	Red Line (Washington Metro)	—N/a	District of Columbia	3,904	Dec 5, 1981

== Notes ==
- ^{a} Stations noted in this list twice with upper and lower levels are considered by WMATA as a single station. The levels are noted separately here because they opened on different dates.
