= Reston Town Center =

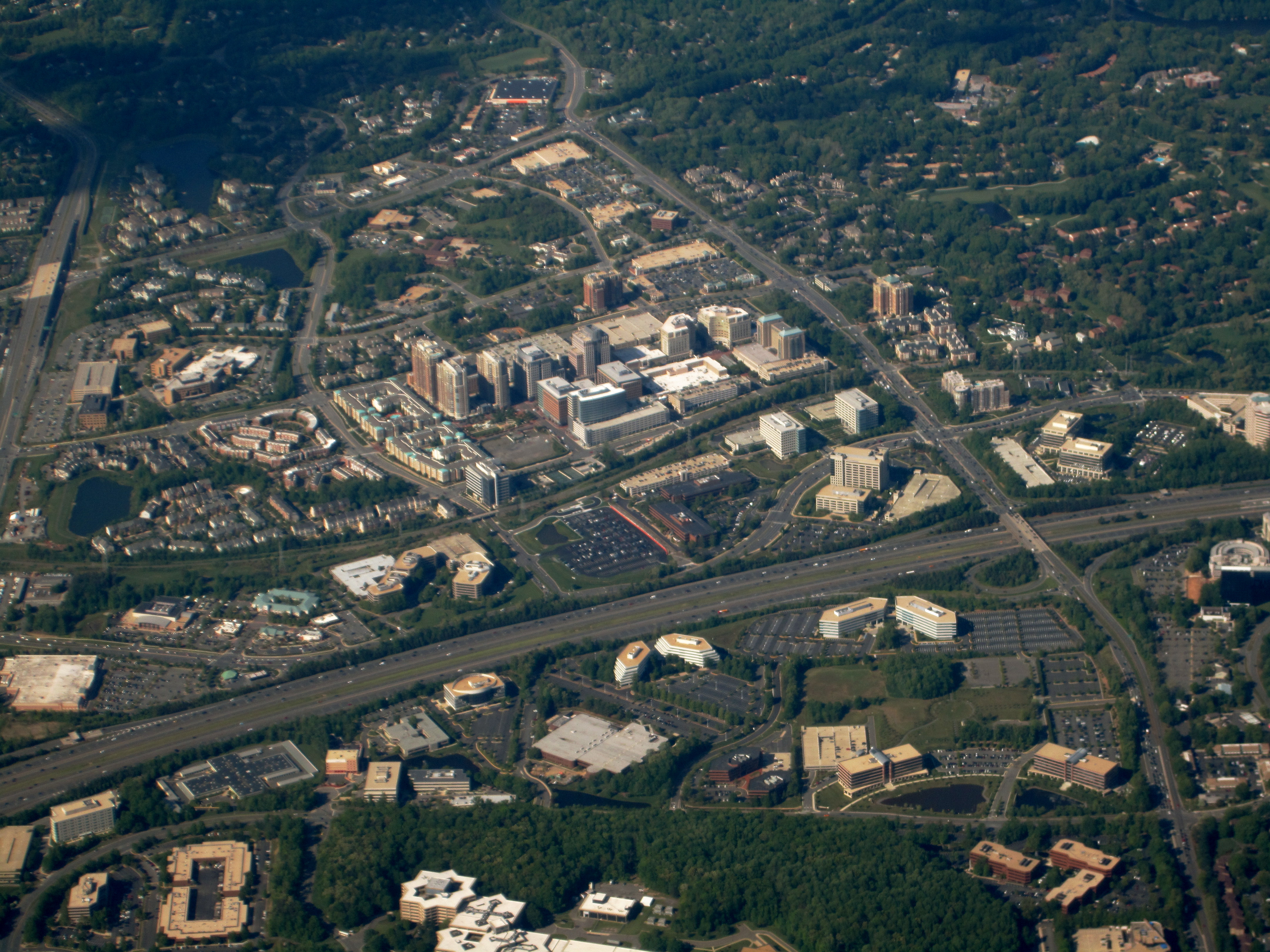
- Aerial view of Reston Town Center

General information
- Type: Mixed-use
- Location: Reston, Virginia, United States
- Coordinates: 38°57′31″N 77°21′25″W
- Elevation: 412 ft (126 m)
- Construction started: 1988 (Phase 1)
- Completed: 2024 (RTC Phase 1)
- Owner: Boston Properties

Height
- Height: 432 ft (132 m)

Other information
- Parking: 7,000 spaces

Website
- www.restontowncenter.com

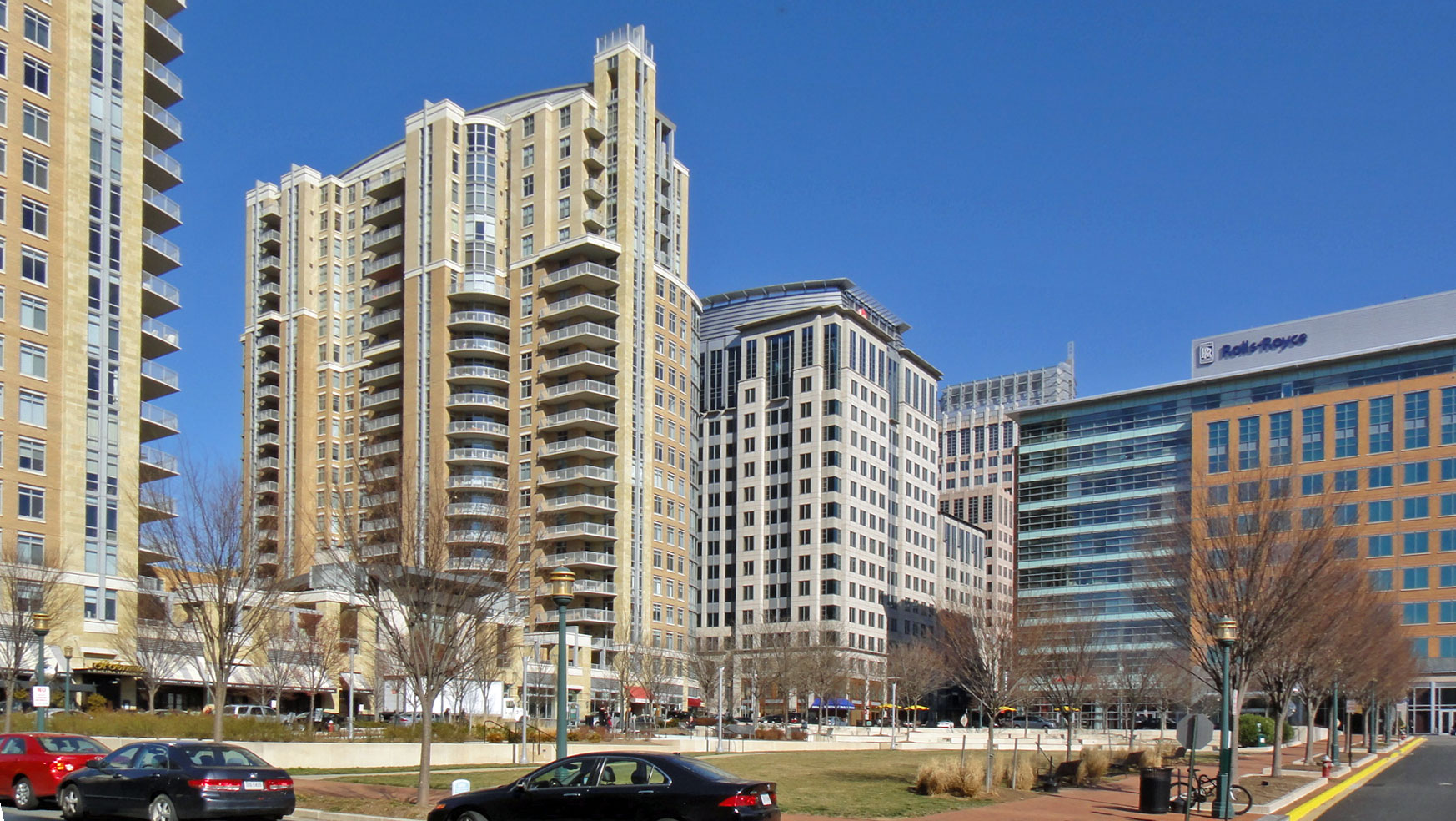
High rises in Reston Town Center

Reston Town Center (also known as RTC and locally as simply, Town Center) is a mixed-use urban development in Reston, Virginia, United States. It is owned and managed primarily by Boston Properties, and features offices, apartments, retail stores, and restaurants.

Reston Town Center is located 6 miles (9.7 km) east of Washington Dulles International Airport and 21 miles (34 km) west of Washington, D.C., just north of Exit 12 (Reston Parkway) of the Dulles Toll Road (VA-267). The Reston Town Center station of the Washington Metro Silver Line, which opened in 2022, serves the south end of the center.

== Description ==
Reston Town Center is designed with open avenues and wide sidewalks. It is built around Fountain Square, a medium-sized open area between the surrounding shops. The main landmark in Fountain Square is Mercury Fountain, designed by Saint Clair Cemin. Directly in front of Mercury Fountain is Market Street, and across the street is the Pavilion. The Pavilion doubles as a covered open-air ice rink during the winter and as a concert and event venue throughout the rest of the year. Adjacent to the fountain are the One & Two Fountain Square buildings with the One & Two Freedom Square buildings located one block to the west. Street parking is available throughout, and seven public parking garages surround the center. As of 2019, Reston Town Center's "downtown" area has more than 50 retail shops and 30 restaurants. In addition, Reston Town Center has a 13-screen cinema which was renovated in 2012, and a Hyatt Regency hotel. Since the most recent major phase of construction in 2009, Reston Town Center, in the past known more for its shopping, dining, and entertainment, has developed into a location for businesses and residences also. High-rise condominiums have led to an influx of young professionals.

Readers of Northern Virginia Magazine chose Reston Town Center for its 2008 top ten list "Hip to be Where", and it was dubbed a "downtown for the 21st century."

== History ==
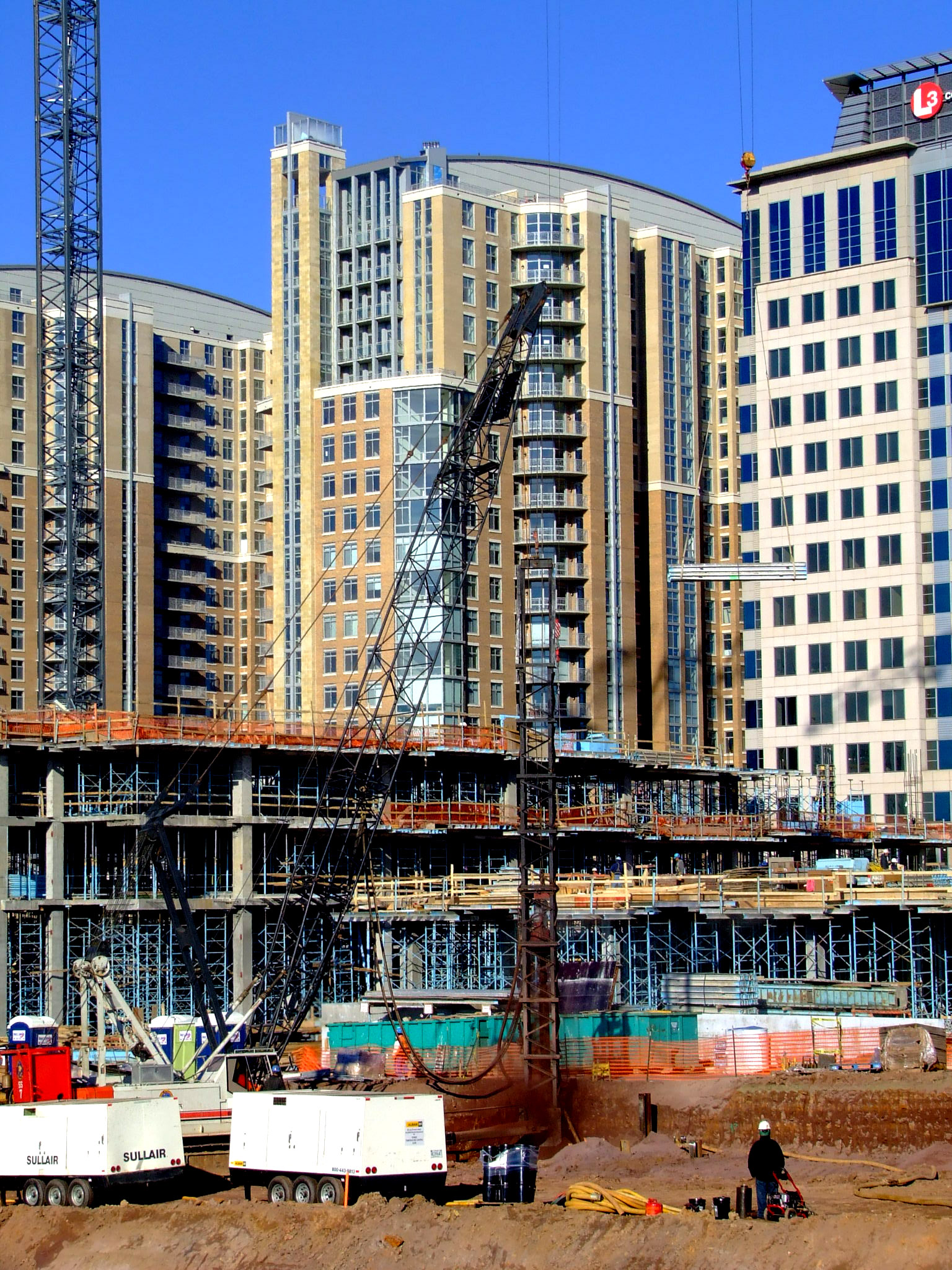
Construction in December 2006

Reston Town Center was conceived and planned starting in the late 1970s by Mobil Land Development for approximately 460 acres (190 ha) of undeveloped land near Washington Dulles International Airport. Construction of the town center began in 1988, over 20 years after the founding of Reston in 1964 by Robert E. Simon.

Phase One of the development opened in October 1990 and was built between Reston Parkway and Library Street. This initial phase centered around Market Street with two 11-story office buildings, One Fountain Square and Two Fountain Square facing the north side of the street. The office buildings were bookended by low-rise office and retail space. Along the south side of the street, smaller office/retail buildings and the Hyatt Regency hotel were constructed. Two public parks were established at the east end of the neighborhood. Following the completion of the first phase, Town Center Parkway was built as a future western border, allowing access to Reston Town Center from nearby thoroughfares.

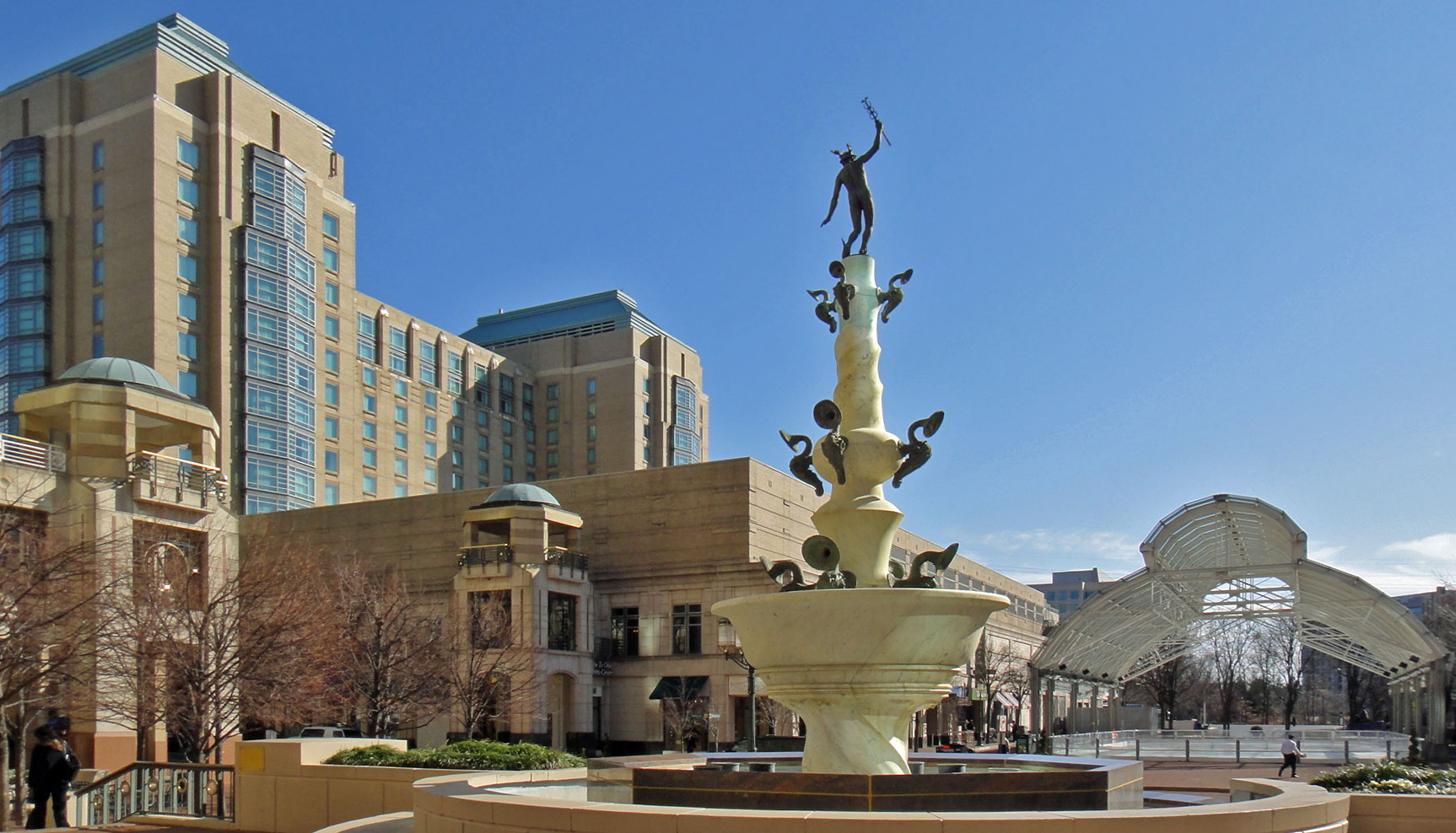
The iconic fountain in the foreground with the pavilion turned into an ice skating rink in the background.

Nearly ten years later, construction commenced west of Library Street on Phase Two, starting on the north side of Market with the erection of the 18-story One Freedom Square and 16-story Two Freedom Square (completed in 2000 and 2001, respectively). Construction also began on the low-rise condominiums and townhomes surrounding Town Center Parkway. Development continued with the 2006 opening of three residential high-rises immediately west of Freedom Square, and the construction of the three South of Market office buildings which were completed in 2008. Along the south side of Democracy Drive, a nine-level parking garage topped by Democracy Tower was completed in 2009. The final portion of the second phase was completed in 2013 with the opening of The Avant, a 15-story apartment high-rise south of Reston Town Square Park.

In late 2015, Boston Properties broke ground for the redevelopment of the surface parking lot north of Fountain Square. The Signature apartments, a pair of high rise residential towers, opened on the site in February 2018. Soon thereafter construction began across President's Street for a glass-clad office tower dubbed 17Fifty. The 17-story building took the place of low-rise retail built during the initial phase and opened in 2020.

=== RTC Next ===
In 2018, Boston Properties received zoning approval from the Fairfax County government to construct a new mixed-use development, dubbed "Reston Gateway" at the time, south of Reston Town Center. The development consists of nine blocks located between the Washington and Old Dominion Railroad Trail and the Reston Town Center metro station. The initial four blocks were completed in 2024 and consist of two office buildings, a hotel, and a mixed-use office/residential building, called Skymark. At the time of completion, Skymark was the tallest residential tower in the Washington metropolitan area at 39 stories.

During construction, the development was re-branded as "RTC Next" and connected over the W&OD Trail to the Reston Town Center core via an elevated bridge. Future plans are to build a similar bridge connecting RTC Next directly to the Reston Town Center metro station.

== Panorama ==
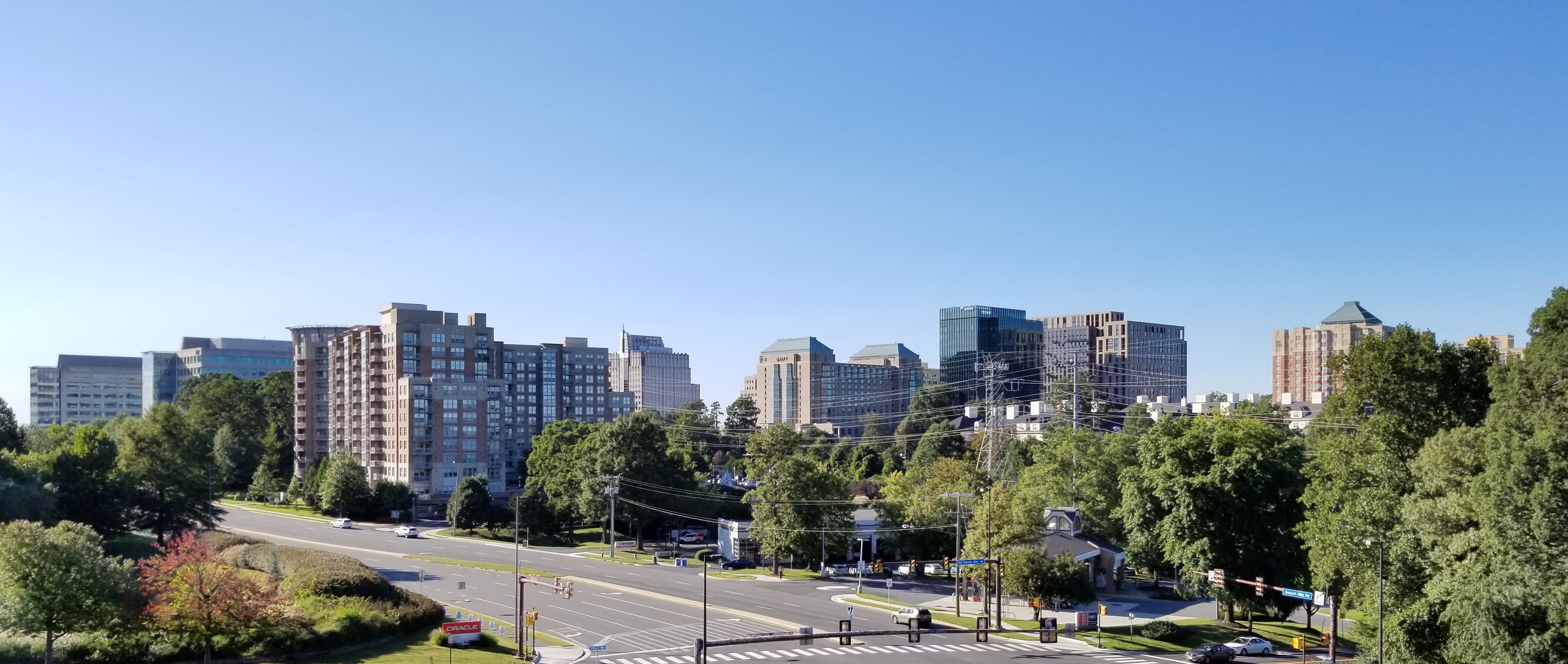

== See also ==
- Reston Station
