= Dulles International Airport station =

Washington Metro station in Virginia, US

Washington Dulles International Airport
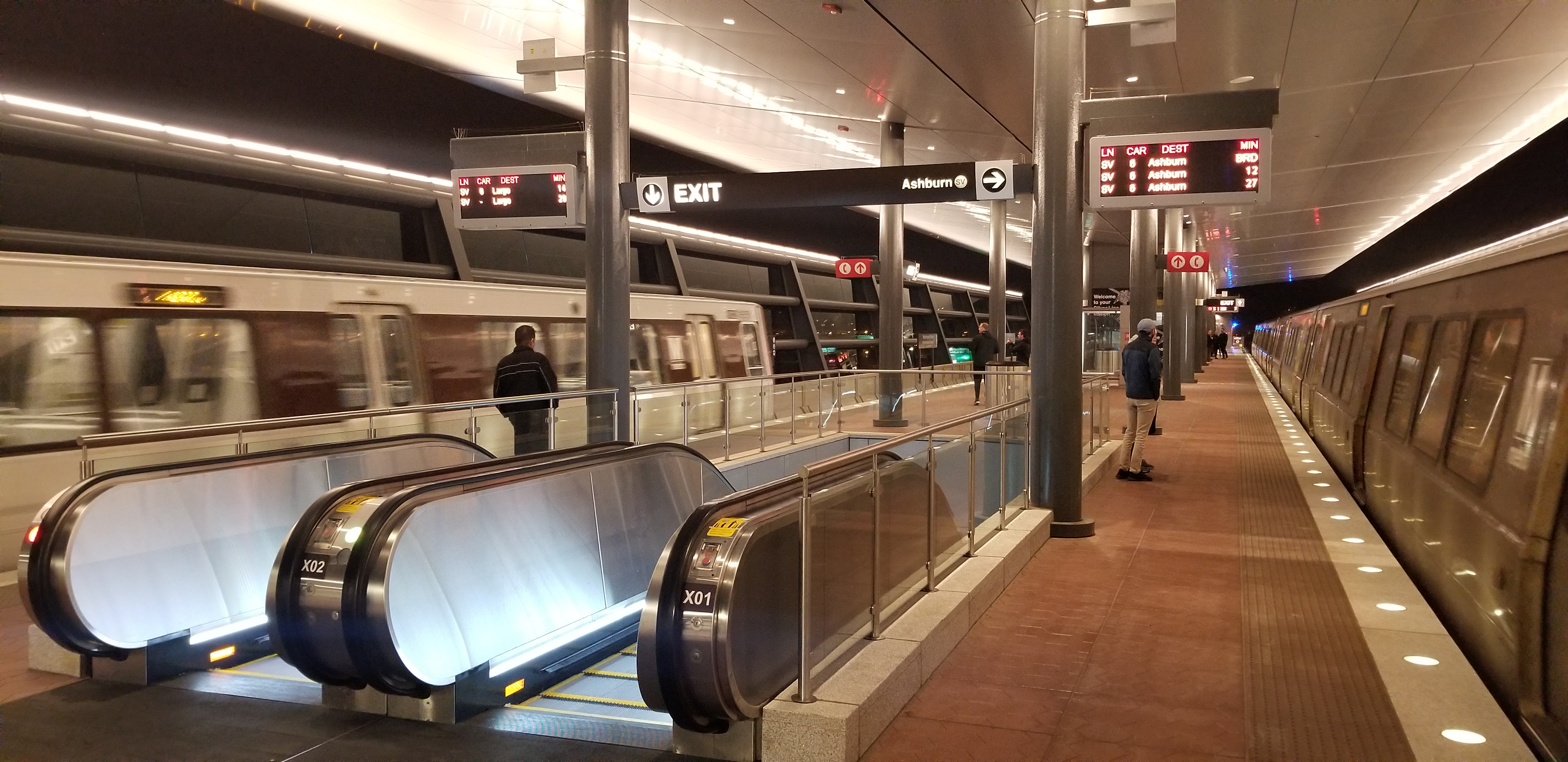
- Washington Dulles International Airport station platform on opening day, November 15, 2022.

General information
- Location: 44920 Saarinen Circle; Dulles, Virginia
- Coordinates: 38°57′21″N 77°26′52″W
- Platforms: 1 island platform
- Tracks: 2
- Connections: Fairfax Connector: 952, 983

Construction
- Structure type: Elevated
- Parking: Paid parking nearby
- Accessible: Yes

Other information
- Station code: N10

History
- Opened: November 15, 2022; 3 years ago

Passengers
- 2025: 2,451 (average weekday)
- Rank: 71 of 98

Services
Preceding station	Washington Metro	Following station
Loudoun Gateway toward Ashburn	Silver Line	Innovation Center toward Downtown Largo or New Carrollton
Route map
Location

Washington Dulles International Airport station (commonly Dulles International Airport or Dulles Airport) is a Washington Metro station at Dulles International Airport in Loudoun County, Virginia, U.S., on the Silver Line. After years of delays, the station opened on November 15, 2022. The station was originally planned to be underground but was built as an above-ground station next to daily parking garage 1.

The station is connected to the Main Terminal using the existing pedestrian tunnel which connects the hourly and daily parking lots and parking garage 1 to the baggage claim level of the airport terminal; the tunnel is equipped with moving sidewalks.

== History ==
A Washington Metro station had been considered for Dulles since at least 1959, when the airport and access road were under construction. A 1971 engineering study suggested an underground station, with the top of the rail 28 feet (8.5 m) below a parking lot. Formal plans were not made until 2002, with the first phase of the project commencing in 2004.

The Silver Line was developed in the 21st century to link Washington, D.C., by rail to Dulles International Airport and the edge cities of Tysons, Reston, Herndon, and Ashburn. It was built in two phases; the first phase, linking Washington, D.C., to Wiehle–Reston East, opened in 2014.

=== Construction ===
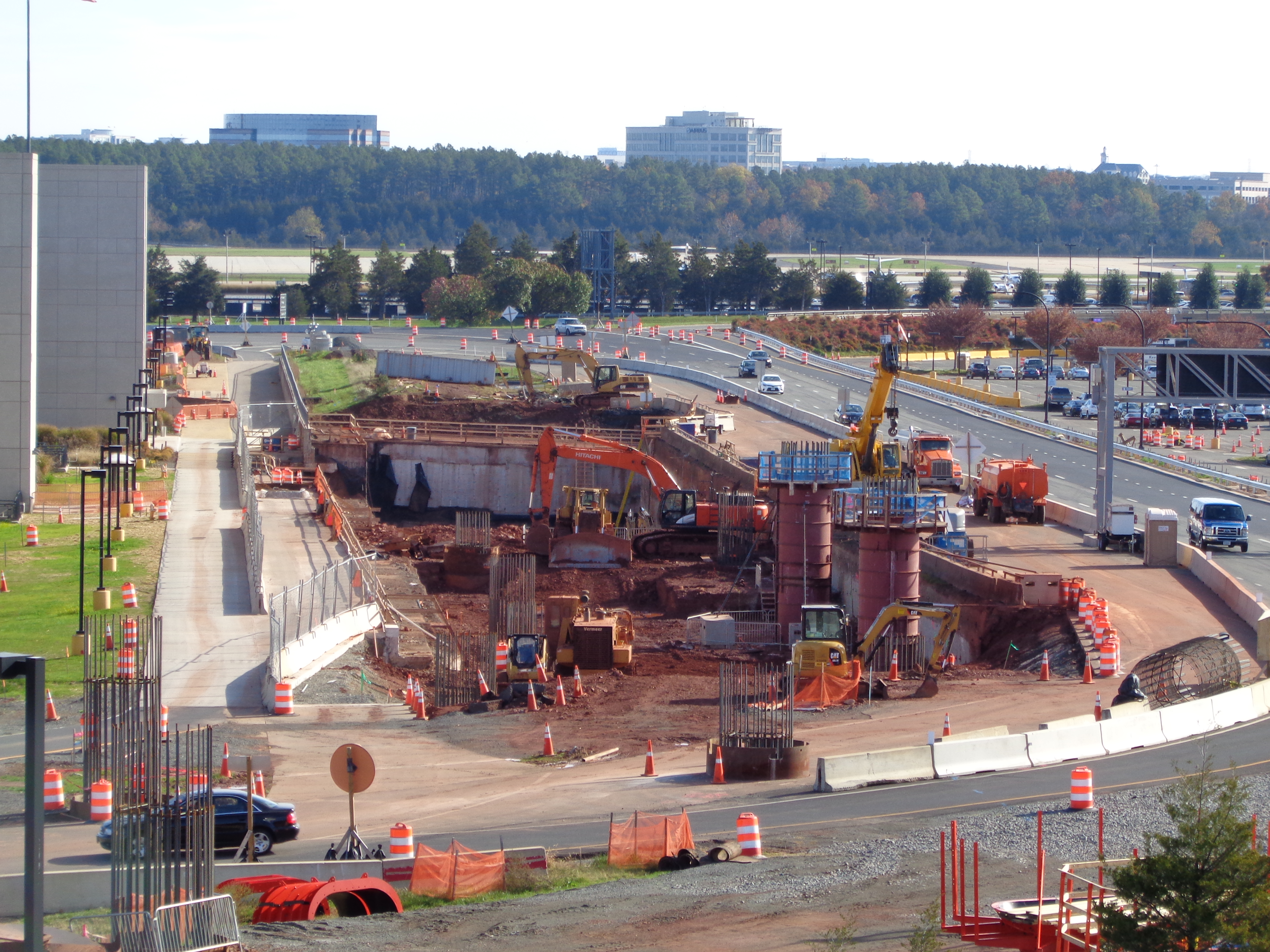
The Dulles Metro Station under construction in November 2013.

The funding and planning of Phase 2 through Dulles Airport continued while Phase 1 was being constructed. On April 6, 2011, the Metropolitan Washington Airports Authority (MWAA) board voted 9–4 to build an underground station 550 feet (170 m) away from the terminal, rather than an above-ground station 1,150 feet (350 m) away from the terminal, at an additional cost of $330 million. Construction of the underground station would have extended its expected opening to mid-2017. However, on July 20, 2011, the MWAA board reversed its previous vote and approved an above-ground station due to pressure from state and local officials to reduce overall project costs. In 2012, the Loudoun County Board of Supervisors voted 5 to 4 to extend the line to Dulles Airport and into the county.

On April 25, 2013, the Phase 2 contract was issued at a cost of $1.177 billion. The originally planned single-side platform station would not meet current Metro specifications for a center platform, which is necessary since current plans would extend service beyond the airport to western suburbs. Plans for an above-ground facility drew concerns from the Virginia Historic Preservation Office regarding the visual impact on the Eero Saarinen-designed terminal. Consultants estimated that an above-ground station would save $640 million in construction costs. The pedestrian tunnel connecting the terminal and daily and hourly lots to parking garage 1 was closed in January 2016 in order to reconfigure that tunnel section to accommodate the future Metro station entrance. The pedestrian tunnel was reopened in November 2018.

=== Opening ===
In April 2015, project officials pushed back the opening date for the station to late 2019, stating that stricter requirements for stormwater management caused much of the delay. Per officials, the line also had to incorporate improvements to the system's automated train controls that were a late addition to the project's first phase. In August 2019, project officials reported that they expected construction on the second phase of the Silver Line to be completed by mid-2020. The opening date was postponed to early 2021, then to late 2021. In February 2021, Metro announced that it would need five months to test the Phase 2 extension. The MWAA then announced that the Phase 2 extension should be substantially complete by Labor Day 2021, although MWAA subsequently missed this deadline.

MWAA declared the work on the rail line to be "substantially complete" in November 2021. However, WMATA estimated that it could take five months of testing and other preparations before passenger service could begin. Simulated service testing began operating along the Phase 2 tracks in October 2022. Phase 2 formally opened on November 15, 2022.
