= Herndon station =

Washington Metro station in Virginia, US

Herndon
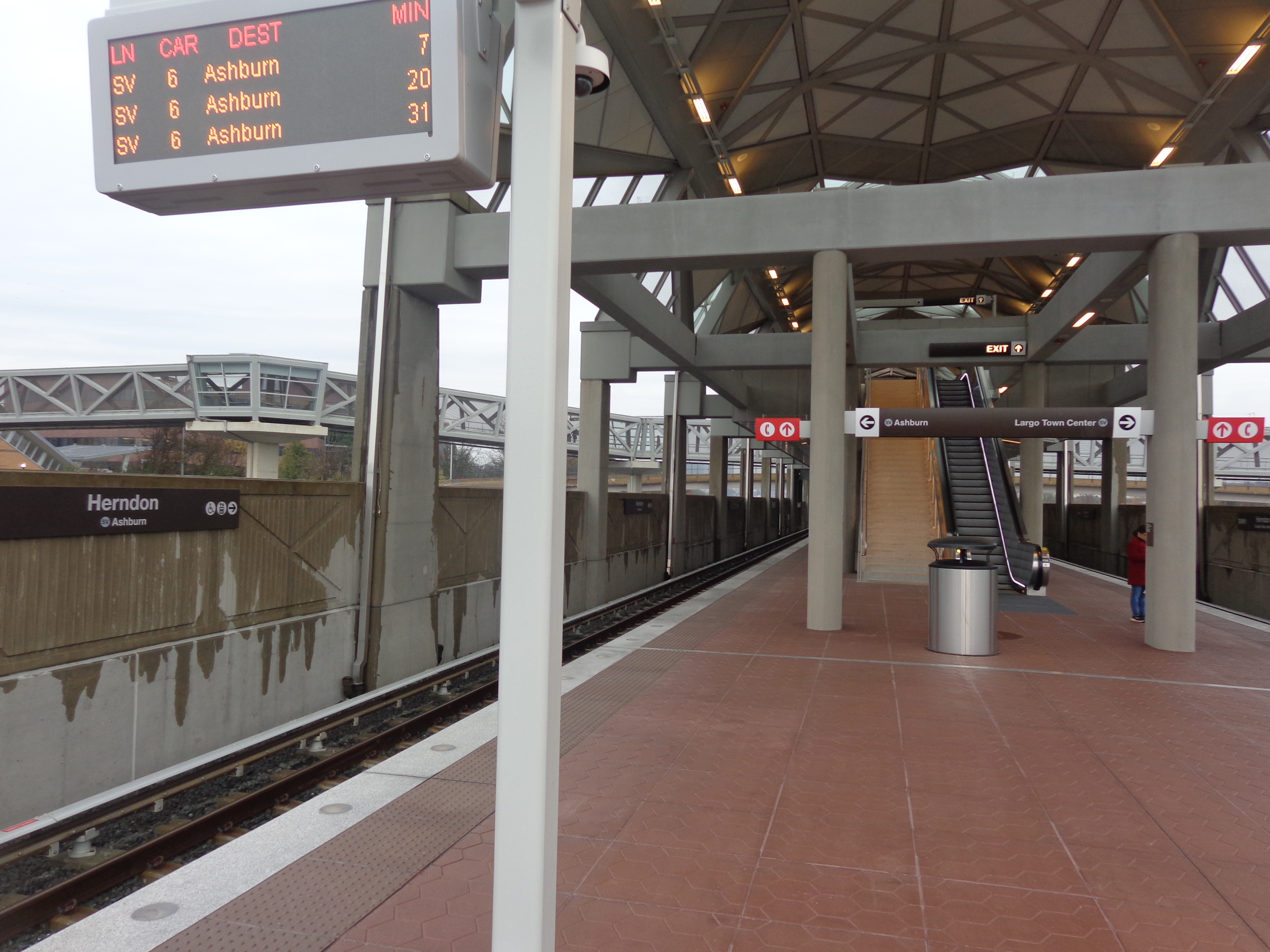
- Herndon station platform in November 2022

General information
- Location: 12530 Sunrise Valley Drive; Herndon, Virginia
- Coordinates: 38°57′10″N 77°23′07″W
- Platforms: 1 island platform
- Tracks: 2
- Connections: Fairfax Connector: 553, 901, 921, 924, 937, 950, 951, 952, 954, RIBS 2

Construction
- Structure type: At-grade
- Parking: 3,500 spaces
- Cycle facilities: Capital Bikeshare, 162 racks, 18 lockers, secure storage room
- Accessible: Yes

Other information
- Station code: N08

History
- Opened: November 15, 2022; 3 years ago

Passengers
- 2025: 1,213 (average weekday)
- Rank: 92 of 98

Services
Preceding station	Washington Metro	Following station
Innovation Center toward Ashburn	Silver Line	Reston Town Center toward Downtown Largo or New Carrollton
Route map
Location

Herndon station (preliminary names: Herndon–Monroe, Herndon–Reston West) is a Washington Metro station in Fairfax County, Virginia, United States, on the Silver Line that opened on November 15, 2022. The station is in the median strip of VA-267 adjacent to the current Herndon-Monroe Park and Ride parking garage and bus station, which is on the south side of the highway. It has two pedestrian bridges across SR 267 to reach entrances on either side of the highway. Bus bays are located on the south side of the highway.

== History ==
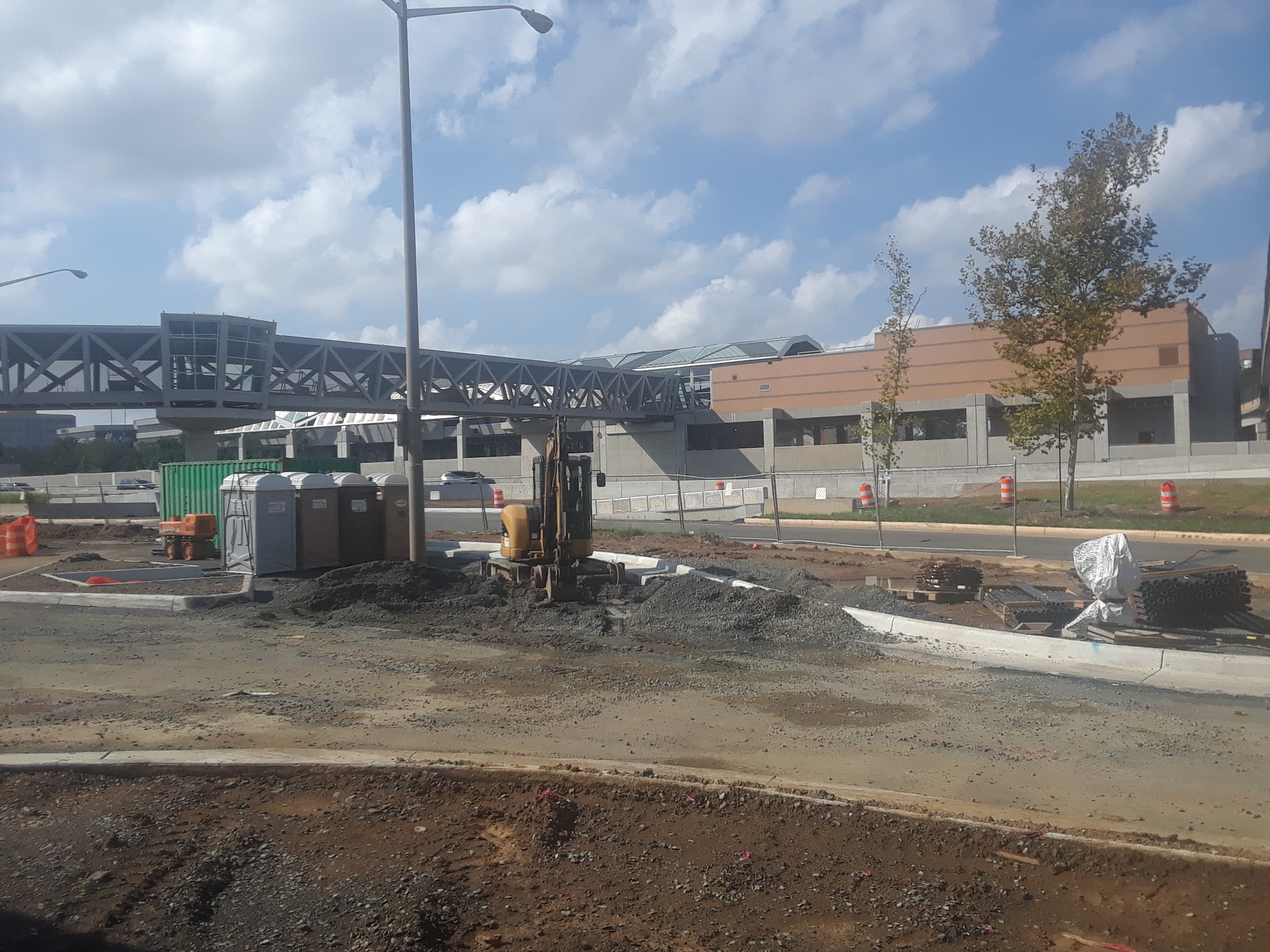
Station construction in September 2018

In anticipation of a future mass transit route in the Dulles Access Road median, in 1999 Fairfax County constructed a $20 million park and ride facility which includes a Fairfax Connector station that serves most bus lines in the Herndon and Reston areas as well as buses carrying commuters to the West Falls Church or other Metro stations daily. The existing facility is served by direct westbound on-ramps and eastbound off-ramps to SR 267. The existing parking garage has 1,750 spaces. The garage has drawn criticism because of alleged construction flaws. The garage has expanded to 3,500 spaces for the Metro station. In the meantime, the Town of Herndon has initiated transportation oriented development of the land on the north side of the station. On November 10, 2009, the town government designated commercial, industrial and multi-unit rental residential properties within the town boundaries for inclusion in a special tax district to fund the construction of Phase II of the Silver Line.

The Silver Line was developed in the 21st century to link Washington, D.C., by rail to Washington Dulles International Airport and the edge cities of Tysons, Reston, Herndon, and Ashburn. It was built in two phases; the first phase, linking Washington, D.C., to Wiehle–Reston East, opened in 2014. The funding and planning of Phase 2 through Dulles Airport continued while Phase 1 was being constructed. In 2012, the Loudoun County Board of Supervisors voted 5 to 4 to extend the line to Dulles Airport and into the county. On April 25, 2013, the Phase 2 contract was issued at a cost of $1.177 billion.

In April 2015, project officials pushed back the opening date for the station to late 2019, stating that stricter requirements for stormwater management caused much of the delay. Per officials, the line also had to incorporate improvements to the system's automated train controls that were a late addition to the project's first phase. In August 2019, project officials reported that they expected construction on the second phase of the Silver Line to be completed by mid-2020. The opening date was postponed to early 2021, then to late 2021. In February 2021, Metro announced that it would need five months to test the Phase 2 extension. The Metropolitan Washington Airports Authority (MWAA) then announced that the Phase 2 extension should be substantially complete by Labor Day 2021, although MWAA subsequently missed this deadline.

MWAA declared the work on the rail line to be "substantially complete" in November 2021. However, WMATA estimated that it could take five months of testing and other preparations before passenger service could begin. Simulated service testing began operating along the Phase 2 tracks in October 2022. Phase 2 formally opened on November 15, 2022. Capital Bikeshare was added near the south entrance on April 8, 2025.
