= Fairfax Connector =

Transit service in Fairfax County, Virginia

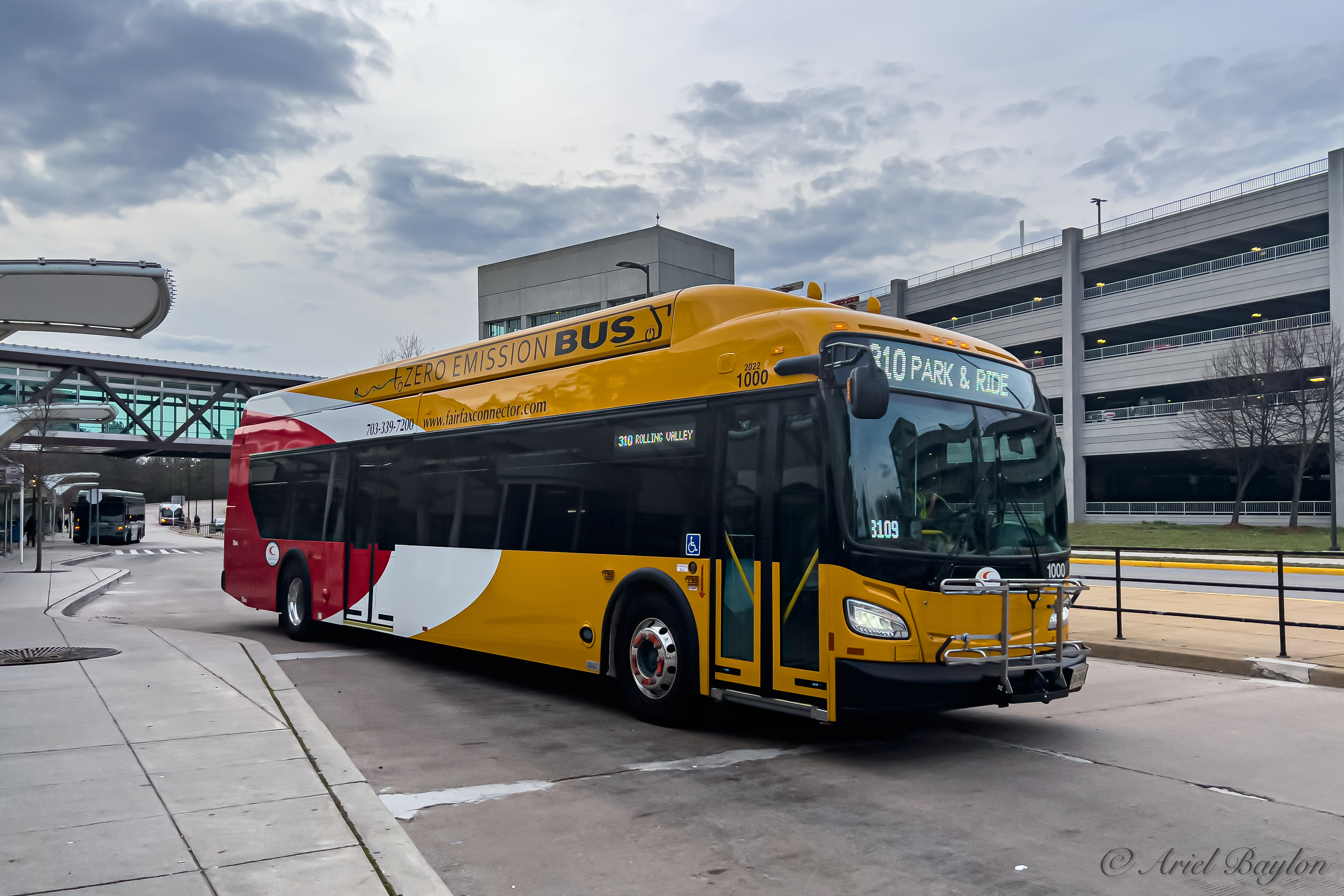
- A New Flyer XE40 at Franconia-Springfield station.
- Parent: Fairfax County
- Founded: September 1985
- Headquarters: 4050 Legato Rd
- Locale: Fairfax County, Virginia
- Service area: 180 square miles
- Service type: Bus service
- Routes: 94 (June 2024)
- Stops: 4,061
- Fleet: 374
- Daily ridership: 32,900 (weekdays, Q2 2026)
- Annual ridership: 9,771,800 (2025)
- Fuel type: Diesel, Diesel-electric Hybrid
- Operator: Transdev
- Website: fairfaxcounty.gov/connector

Fairfax Connector is a public transit agency owned and managed by Fairfax County, Virginia. The system operates within Fairfax County and connects to WMATA Metrobus, Washington Metro, and the Virginia Railway Express, as well as other local bus systems. It serves several Fairfax Metro stations and the City of Alexandria. Limited service is also provided to the City of Fairfax, Washington Dulles International Airport, and The Pentagon. In 2025, the system had a ridership of 9,771,800, or about 32,900 per weekday as of the second quarter of 2026. Fairfax Connector services are operated under contract by Transdev, and it operates the third largest bus fleet in Washington Metropolitan Area.

== History ==
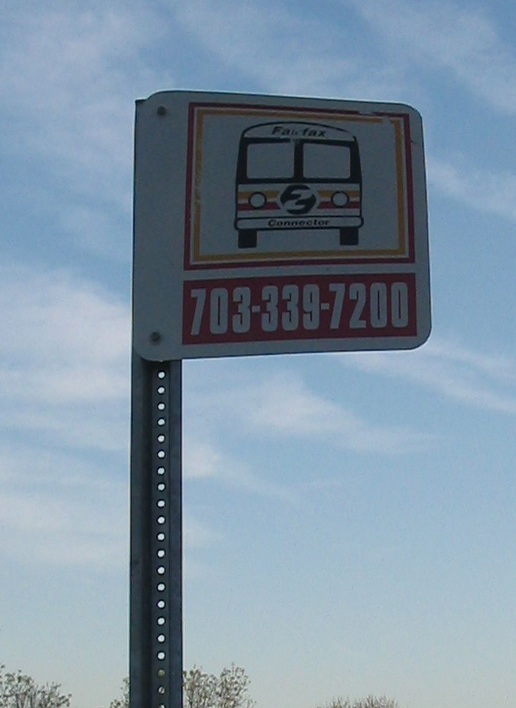
A typical Fairfax Connector bus stop sign

=== 1980s ===
Beginning in 1973, Fairfax County had paid the Washington Metropolitan Area Transit Authority to provide bus service in the county. By the early 1980s, the county had become one of several local jurisdictions unhappy with the high cost and unpredictability of cost increases for the service, and in 1981 had commissioned a study—at the cost of $58,000—on creating a feeder bus service in the south-east portion of the county. This service was to be based around the Huntington Metro station then being constructed in that area of the county.

Based on three consultant studies, the last of which proposed that the county might achieve savings of $750,000, and the recommendations of county staff, the county in July 1984 directed implementation of this service. The county purchased 33 Orion buses from Bus Industries of America in January 1985 for $4.2 million, and awarded the $2.2 million contract for startup and first-year operations to National Transit Services in May of that year.

The first buses rolled out in September 1985 as a lower-cost alternative to the Metrobus service of the regional Washington Metropolitan Area Transit Authority. The original routes connected the southern part of the county (near the Mount Vernon Estate) to the Huntington Metro station which borders Alexandria. This area continues to be the core of the system, and is noted for the number of residents in the Richmond Highway area who use the service at all times of the day. It had ten routes, and numerous routes served Huntington Station. These first 10 routes were previously served by Metrobus. In 1988, The Connector began to operate express routes to connect to Pentagon station. It also expanded through the southeastern portion of Fairfax.

=== 1990s ===
In 1990, The Connector took over the operation of the RIBS (Reston Internal Bus Service). Service continued to be provided through the southern portion of Alexandria when Van Dorn Street station opened in 1991. In 1994, the service was extended to the high-technology industrial areas of suburban Reston, and Herndon, located between Washington, D.C., and Washington Dulles International Airport. Along State Route 267 (the Dulles Toll Road), express buses carry commuters from free park-and-ride lots to the Washington Metro system. In 1999, the Herndon-Monroe Park & Ride and the Tysons Westpark Transit Station opened, extending their operation within the county.

=== 2000s ===
In 2002, the Connector ordered its first buses operating on Ultra-Low Sulfur Diesel fuel. The network expanded three years later with the opening of the Lorton Park-and-Ride, followed by the Gambrill Road Park-and-Ride in 2005. During this period, the system began integrating with the SmarTrip payment system, allowing passengers to utilize the WMATA run fare network. MV Transportation assumed operations from Veolia Transport on July 1, 2009.

=== 2010s ===
Major changes began in 2010, when the Reston East Park-and-Ride closed to make way for the Silver Line construction. After the Silver Line opened in 2014, The Connector modified its service by providing three circulator routes within Tysons Corner, as well as new service to McLean. Many routes were modified to give riders the ability to transfer with the Silver Line and other portions of the network.

On July 1, 2019, Transdev commenced a five-year contract to operate the network with an option to extend for a further 10 years. In December 2019, Fairfax Connector workers operating under Transdev went on strike, reducing system operations to Sunday schedules and impacting approximately 30,000 daily riders.

=== 2020s ===
On February 22, 2024, Fairfax Connector employees initiated a strike against Transdev, suspending almost all fixed-route services. Regular operations resumed the next month following a new collective bargaining agreement with the Amalgamated Transit Union.

== Fares ==
Fairfax Connector fares are paid in cash or via the WMATA owned SmarTrip system. Fares paid using SmarTrip also include free and discounted transfers between various services.

== Routes ==
As of June 2026, the Fairfax Connector bus system consists of 93 routes.

Route	Name	Terminals		Notes
101	Fort Hunt	Huntington station	Mt. Vernon Estate & Gardens	
109	Rose Hill	Huntington station	Van Dorn Street station	
151	Engleside – Mt. Vernon	Huntington station	Mt. Vernon Estate & Gardens	
152	Groveton – Mt. Vernon	Huntington station	Mt. Vernon Estate & Gardens	
159	Engleside	Huntington station	Sacramento Dr & Richmond Hwy	Weekday limited-stop peak service
161	Hybla Valley Circulator	Huntington station	Inova Mt. Vernon Hospital	Counter-clockwise loop
162	Hybla Valley Circulator	Huntington station	Inova Mt. Vernon Hospital	Clockwise loop
171	Richmond Highway	Huntington station	Lorton VRE Station	
231	Kingstowne Circulator	Franconia–Springfield station	Van Dorn Street station	Weekday peak service; Counter-clockwise loop
232	Kingstowne Circulator	Franconia–Springfield station	Van Dorn Street station	Weekday peak service; Clockwise loop
301	Telegraph Road	Huntington Station	Franconia–Springfield station	Weekday peak service
305	Newington Forest – Silverbrook Road	Lorton VRE Station	Franconia–Springfield station	Weekday peak service
306	GMU – Pentagon	George Mason University	Pentagon station	Weekday midday service
308	Franconia-Springfield – Mt. Vernon Hospital	Franconia–Springfield station	Inova Mt. Vernon Hospital	No Sunday service
310	Franconia Road – Rolling Valley	Rolling Valley Park & Ride	Huntington station	
321	Greater Springfield Circulator	Van Dorn Street station	Franconia–Springfield station	Counter-clockwise loop
322	Greater Springfield Circulator	Van Dorn Street station	Franconia–Springfield station	Clockwise loop
334	Newington Circulator	Franconia–Springfield station	Defense Logistics Agency (DLA)	Weekday peak service (and one midday trip); Loop service
335	Fort Belvoir "The Eagle"	Franconia–Springfield station	Fort Belvoir	Weekday peak service; Loop service
340	Patriot Ridge – Saratoga	Franconia–Springfield station	Fort Belvoir	Weekday non-peak service; Counter-clockwise loop
341	Boston Boulevard – Saratoga	Franconia–Springfield station	Saratoga Park & Ride	Weekday peak service
371	Lorton – Springfield	Franconia–Springfield station	Lorton Park & Ride	
393	Saratoga – Mark Center – Pentagon	Saratoga Park & Ride	Pentagon station	Weekday peak service
394	Saratoga – Backlick – Pentagon	Saratoga Shopping Center, Backlick North Park & Ride	Pentagon station	Weekday peak service
395	Gambrill Road – Pentagon	Gambrill Rd Park & Ride	Pentagon station	Weekday peak service
396	Backlick – Pentagon	Backlick North Park & Ride	Pentagon station	Weekday peak service
401	Backlick – Gallows	Franconia–Springfield station	Tysons-Westpark Station	Northbound service
402	Backlick – Gallows	Tysons Westpark Station	Franconia–Springfield station	Southbound service
423	Tysons Circulator – Westpark	Tysons station		Loop service
427	Spring Hill Metro – Farm Credit Administration	Spring Hill station	Farm Credit Administration	Weekday peak service
432	Old Courthouse – Beulah	Spring Hill station	Farm Credit Administration	Weekday peak service
461	Vienna – Oakton	Vienna station		Weekday loop service
462	Dunn Loring – Navy Federal – Tysons	Dunn Loring station	Tysons station	Weekday peak service
463	Maple Avenue – Tysons	Vienna station	Tysons station	
467	Dunn Loring – Tysons	Dunn Loring station	Tysons station	Non-peak service
480	Wolf Trap Express	McLean station	Wolf Trap Filene Center	Seasonal event service
494	Springfield – Tysons	Franconia–Springfield station	Tysons station	Weekday service
495	Burke Centre – Tysons	Burke Centre VRE station	Tysons station	Weekday peak service (and one midday trip)
507	Sunset Hills – Sunrise Valley	Wiehle–Reston East station		Weekday loop service
553	Kingstream – Herndon – Fox Mill	Reston Town Center station	Kingstream Dr & Kingsvale Cir	Weekday peak service
557	Reston South – Soapstone	Reston South Park & Ride	Wiehle–Reston East station	Weekday peak service
558	Center Harbor – Wiehle	Wiehle–Reston East station	Center Harbor Rd & Wiehle Ave	
559	Reston Town Center – Wiehle	Reston Town Center Transit Station	Wiehle–Reston East station	
574	Reston – Tysons	Reston Town Center Transit Station	Tysons Westpark Station	
598	Reston South – Pentagon – Crystal City	Reston South Park & Ride	Crystal City station	Weekday peak service
605	Reston – Fair Oaks	Reston Town Center station	Monument Dr Transit Center	
610	George Mason University – Centreville	Centreville (Stone Rd) Park & Ride	George Mason University	No Sunday service
615	Fair Oaks – Greenbriar	Inova Fair Oaks Hospital	Monument Dr Transit Center	No Sunday service
625	Random Hills – Pender Drive	Monument Dr Transit Center	Fairfax County Housing Office	Weekday midday service
630	Centreville – Monument Drive	Centreville Park & Ride	Monument Dr Transit Center	
642	Stone Road – Centreville North	Centreville Park & Ride	Sullyfield Circle & U.S Route 50	Weekday peak service (and one midday trip)
651	Chantilly – Monument Drive	Conference Center Dr & Parkstone Dr	Monument Dr Transit Center	
652	Chantilly – Franklin Farm	Sullyfield Circle & U.S Route 50	Stringfellow Park & Ride	Weekday peak service
660	Stone Road – Tysons	Centreville Park & Ride	Tysons station	Weekday peak service
662	Stone Road – Vienna	Centreville Park & Ride	Vienna station	Non-peak service
663	Stringfellow Road – Vienna	Stringfellow Rd Park & Ride	Vienna station	Weekday peak service
670	Chantilly – Franconia-Springfield	Avion Pkwy & Stonecroft Blvd	Franconia–Springfield station	Weekday peak service
671	Chantilly – Inova Fairfax – Dunn Loring	Avion Pkwy & Stonecroft Blvd	Dunn Loring station	Weekday peak service
672	Chantilly – Dunn Loring	Avion Pkwy & Stonecroft Blvd	Dunn Loring station	Non-peak service
697	Stringfellow Road – D Street SW	Stringfellow Park & Ride	D St SW, Washington, D.C.	Weekday peak service
698	Stringfellow Road – Vienna – Pentagon	Stringfellow Rd Park & Ride	Pentagon station	Weekday peak service
699	Monument Drive Transit Center – Downtown D.C.	Monument Dr Transit Center	Downtown Washington, D.C.	Weekday peak service
703	Pimmit Hills	West Falls Church station	McLean station	No Sunday service
715	East Falls Church – Langley	East Falls Church station	Langley	Weekday peak service
721	Chain Bridge Road – McLean	McLean station	Beverly Dr & Old McLean Village Dr	
798	Tysons – Bethesda Express	Tysons-Westpark Transit Station	Bethesda	Weekday peak service
803	Annandale Road	East Falls Church station	Annandale	
834	Little River Turnpike – Pentagon	Pentagon station	NVCC-Annandale	Weekday peak service
835	Braeburn Drive – Pentagon Express	NVCC-Annandale	Pentagon station	Weekday peak service
901	Herndon Metro – Centreville	Herndon station	Centreville-UMC Park & Ride	
921	Herndon Circulator	Herndon station		Counter-clockwise loop
924	NOVA Loudoun – Herndon – Franklin Farm	NVCC-Loudoun	Kinross Cir & Kilbrennan Ct	
937	Coppermine – Elden	Herndon station	Herndon-Harbor House	
950	Reston Town Center – Herndon Metro	Reston Town Center Station	Herndon station	
951	Wiehle-Reston East – Innovation Center	Innovation Center station	Wiehle–Reston East station	Weekday peak service
952	Sunset Hills – Dulles Airport	Dulles International Airport	Wiehle–Reston East station	
954	Sterling Plaza – Herndon Metro	Sterling Plaza	Herndon station	
983	Dulles Airport – Udvar-Hazy Center	Udvar-Hazy Center	Dulles International Airport	

=== Transportation Association of Greater Springfield ===
The Transportation Association of Greater Springfield (TAGS) routes were originally operated by Metrobus. Fairfax Connector assumed operations of TAGS on January 4, 2021, maintaining the free weekday circulator service in the immediate Franconia-Springfield area.

Route	Name	Terminals		Notes
350	Frontier Drive – Hilton Springfield – Franconia-Springfield Metrorail Station (TAGS)	Franconia–Springfield station	Springfield Town Center	
351	TSA – NVCC Medical College – Franconia-Springfield Metrorail Station (TAGS)	Franconia–Springfield station	TSA, NVCC Campus	Peak service
352	TSA – Springfield Town Center – Franconia-Springfield Metrorail Station (TAGS)	Franconia–Springfield station	TSA, Springfield Town Center	Midday service
353	Franconia-Springfield Metrorail Station – Metro Park (TAGS)	Franconia–Springfield station	Metro Park	

=== Reston Internal Bus Service routes ===
Route	Name	Terminals		Notes
RIBS1	Lake Anne – Hunters Woods	Reston Town Center Station	Lake Anne Village Center	Clockwise loop
RIBS2	Reston – South Lakes Drive – Herndon Metro	Reston Town Center Station	Herndon station	
RIBS3	Lake Anne – Hunters Woods	Reston Town Center Station	Hunters Woods Village Center	Counter-clockwise loop
RIBS4	Reston Town Center – North Point	Reston Town Center station	North Point Village Center	
RIBS5	Herndon – Reston Town Center	Reston Town Center Station	Herndon Harbor House	

== Fleet ==
Fairfax Connector operates a fleet consisting of Diesel, Hybrid, and Electric buses produced by Orion Bus Industries, New Flyer and Gillig. The agency also operates three garages in Newington, Fair Lakes, and Reston.The Fairfax Connector fleet roster consists of the following buses:

Image	Type	Year	Fleet No.	Engine	Transmission	Notes
	New Flyer XD40	2011	9645-9675	Cummins ISL9 EPA10	Allison B400R6	Some units have been retired.; 9655 retired due to accident damage.
	New Flyer XD40	2011	7701-7737	Cummins ISL9 EPA10	Allison B400R6	Some units have been retired.; 7725 retired in 2022 due to accident damage.
	New Flyer XD35	2012	9676-9690	Cummins ISL9 EPA10	Allison B400R6	
	New Flyer XD40	2012	7738-7753, 7755-7758	Cummins ISL9 EPA10	Allison B400R6	7754 was renumbered to 7758 as the 7754 number was being used on a presevred Orion I bus.
	Orion Bus Industries Orion VII EPA10 BRT HEV (07.503)	2012	3082-3087	Cummins ISB6.7 EPA10	BAE System HDS200	ex-WMATA units, bought in 2020.; Used only on TAGS services.; Only 3084 and 3087 remain in service as of Fall 2026.
	New Flyer XD40	2013	7759-7777	Cummins ISL9 EPA13	Allison B400R6	
	New Flyer XD35	2014	7778-7794	Cummins ISL9 EPA13	Allison B400R6	7783 retired after crashing into a guardrail along Route 267 in November 2025.; 7794 retired in 2025.
	New Flyer XD35	2015	7800-7811	Cummins ISL9 EPA13	Allison B400R6	
	New Flyer XD40	2015	7795-7799	Cummins ISL9 EPA13	Allison B400R6	Primarily used on Routes 697 and 699.; Units wrapped in special liveries promoting Fairfax Connector's Express services.
	New Flyer XD40	2017	1730-1739	Cummins L9 EPA17	Allison B400R6	ex-NCSU Wolfline units, leased and eventually bought in 2021.; Owned by Transdev.; Retain the NCSU Wolfline livery but with Fairfax Connector Logos applied.
	New Flyer XD35	2018	7816-7825	Cummins L9 EPA17	Allison B400R6	
	New Flyer XD40	2018	7812-7815	Cummins L9 EPA17	Allison B400R6	7814 and 7815 wrapped in special liveries promoting the Route 699 Express.
	New Flyer XD40	2019	7826-7829	Cummins L9 EPA19	Allison B400R6	
	New Flyer XD40	2020	7830-7840	Cummins L9 EPA19	Allison B400R6	
	New Flyer XD40	2021	7841-7688	Cummins L9 EPA21	Allison B400R6	7865 regularly runs on the 798 Bethesda-Tysons Express, and wears a special wrap promoting the route.
	New Flyer XD35	2022	7877-7892	Cummins L9 EPA21	Allison B400R6	
	New Flyer XD40	2022	7869-7876	Cummins L9 EPA21	Allison B400R6	
	New Flyer XE40	2022	1000-1007	Siemens ELFA-3 Electric Motor		First Electric Buses for Fairfax Connector.
	New Flyer XD40	2023	7893-7904	Cummins L9 EPA21	Allison B400R6	
	New Flyer XE35	2023	1010-1011	Siemens ELFA-3 Electric Motor		
	New Flyer XE40	2023	1008-1009	Siemens ELFA-3 Electric Motor		1009 crashed and caught fire at the Monument Drive Garage in December 2024, causing severe damage. Unit originally suspected to be retired, however returned to active service in 2026 after extensive repairs.
	New Flyer XD40	2024	7905-7950	Cummins L9 EPA24	Allison B400R6	7934 out of service after colliding head-on with a PRTC OmniRide MCI D45CRT at the Pentagon Transit Center in April 2026.
	Gillig Low Floor LF30	2024	7951-7960	Cummins L9 EPA24	Allison B300R6	First Gillig Order for Fairfax Connector.; Replaced Orion VII NG 32-Footers.
	Gillig Low Floor LF30	2025	7961-7972	Cummins L9 EPA24	Allison B300R6	Replaced Orion VII NG 32-Footers.
	Gillig Low Floor Plus EV 40	2025	1012-1013	Cummins BES Electric Motor		
	New Flyer XDE40	2026	3000-3018	Cummins B6.7 EPA 24	Allison eGen Flex H40 Max Hybrid System	First Hybrid buses purchased directly from NFI for Fairfax Connector.; First Hybrid Buses in the D.C. Region to use the Allison eGen Flex Hybrid System, which superseded the H-EP Series.
	Gillig Low Floor Plus EV 40	2026	1014-1021	Cummins BES Electric Motor		

=== On order ===
Type	Year built	Fleet Numbers (quantity)	Engine	Transmission	Notes
Gillig Low Floor Plus LF35 HEV	2026	3019-3054	Cummins B6.7 EPA24	Allison eGen Flex H40 Max Hybrid System	All 36 buses are currently delivered and are being inspected, and should be released into service later this year.; Originally intended to be a New Flyer XDE35 order, later switched to Gillig.

=== Retired Fleet ===
Delivered	Type	Numbers	Engine	Transmission	Picture	Notes
1985	Orion I 36ft	7700-7732	Detroit Diesel 6V92TA	Allison MT-647		First buses for Fairfax Connector.; Originally had Detroit Diesel 6V71TA Engines and Allison MT-644 Transmissions.
1987	Orion I 31ft	7800-7809	Detroit Diesel 6V92TA	Allison HT-748		Originally had Detroit Diesel 6V71TA Engines and Allison MT-644 Transmissions.
1987-1988	Orion I 36ft	7733-7739	Detroit Diesel 6V92TA	Allison HT-748		
1988-1989	TMC RTS-06	7941L-7952L	Detroit Diesel 6V92TA	Allison V731		ex-LACMTA units.
1989	Orion I 36ft	7740-7744	Detroit Diesel 6V92TA	Allison HT-748		
1989	TMC RTS-06	7953L-7954L	Detroit Diesel 6V92TA	Unknown		ex-Muncie Indiana Transit System (MITS) units.
1990-1991	Orion I 36ft	7745-7761	Detroit Diesel 6V92TA	Allison HT-748		7754 was converted into the Mobile Accessible Travel Training (MATT) bus by Fairfax Connector.
1994	TMC RTS-06	7810-7854	Detroit Diesel Series 50	Allison V731		7832 preseved by the DMV Mass Transit museum until 2017.; 7849 preserved by the Commonwealth Coach and Trolley Museum.; 7842 bought by Pioneer Express in Oregon. Re-listed for auction in 2017.
1997	Orion V 40ft	8033–8036	Detroit Diesel Series 50	Allison B400R		Formerly New Orleans Transit Authority and Valley Coach Units.
1999	Orion V 40ft	7859-7869	Detroit Diesel Series 50	Allison B400R		
2000	Orion V 40ft	7782-7799, 7870-7890	Detroit Diesel Series 50	Allison B400R		
1998	Orion V 32ft	7903-7912	Detroit Diesel Series 50	Allison B400R		
1999	Orion V 32ft	7913-7917	Detroit Diesel Series 50	Allison B400R		7917 preserved by the DMV Mass Transit Museum.
2002	Orion V 35ft	7891-7898	Detroit Diesel Series 50EGR	Allison B400R		Last High-Floor buses for Fairfax connector.; Some units sold to Transurbano.
2002	Orion V 32ft	7918-7927	Detroit Diesel Series 50EGR	Allison B400R		Last High-Floor buses for Fairfax connector.; Some units sold to Transurbano.
2003	Ford E-350/Champion Cutaways	7928–7930	Ford PowerStroke 7.3L	6-Speed Automatic		
2006	International/Eldorado Aero-Elites	7931–7940	International DT466E	Allison 2200		
2007	New Flyer D40LFR	9700–9751	Cummins ISL EPA07	Allison B400R6		
2007	New Flyer D35LFR	9754–9769	Cummins ISL EPA07	Allison B400R6		
2008	Orion VII NG 32ft	9770–9795	Cummins ISL EPA07	Allison B400R5		Retired from 2024-2026 and replaced by Gillig Buses.; 9793 was bought by a private owner.
2009–2010	New Flyer D40LFR	9600–9644	Cummins ISL EPA07	Allison B400R6		Several units returned to service in 2024-2025 as contingency units.
2010	New Flyer DE42LFA	6568, 6577, 6584–6585, 6591, 6609	Cummins ISL EPA07	Allison EP40 Hybrid System		ex-WMATA units, bought in 2021 after Fairfax Connector took over several MetroBus routes.; Replaced by XD40s in 2024.
