= Reston Town Center station =

Washington Metro station in Virginia, US

Reston Town Center
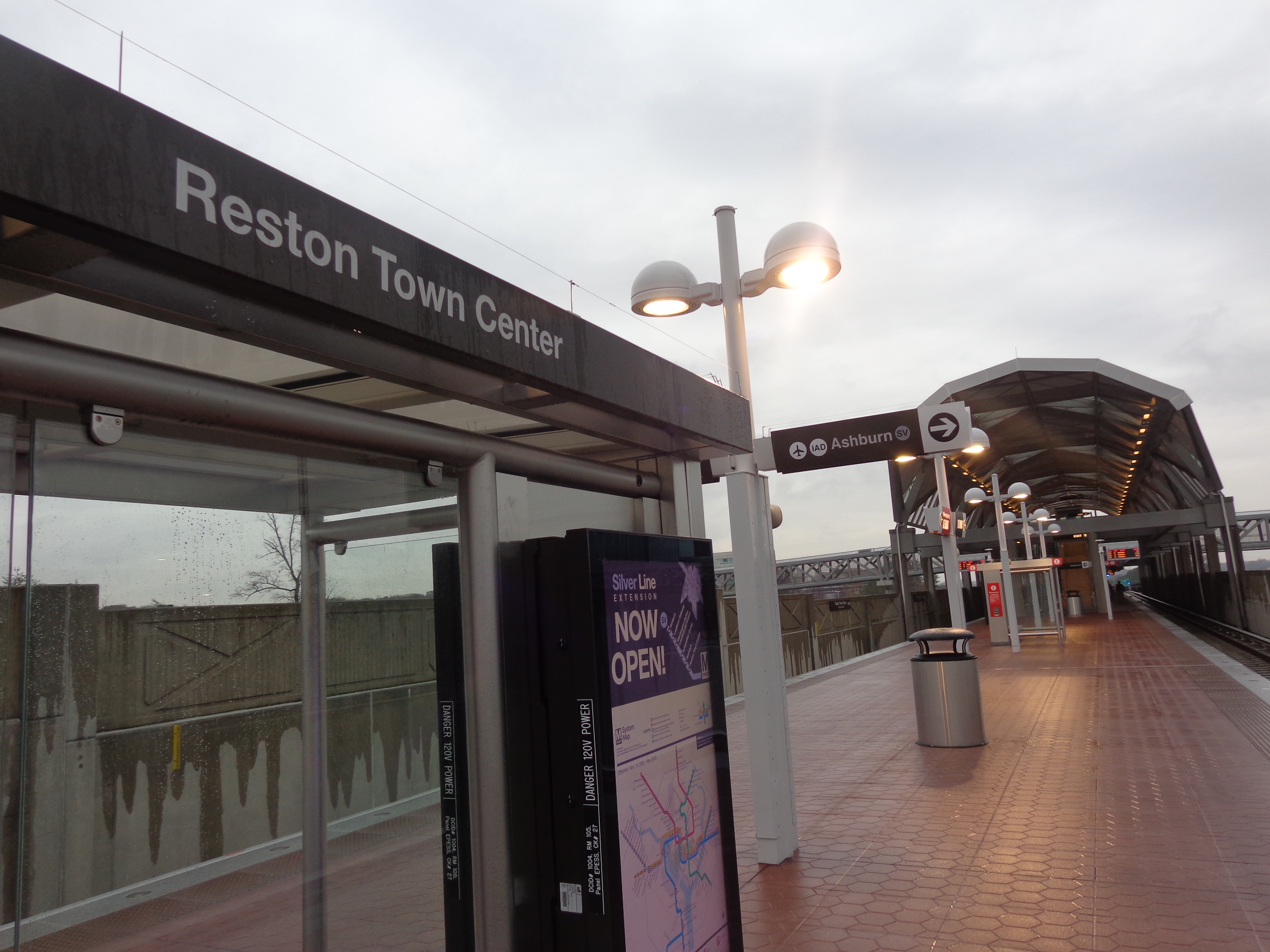
- Reston Town Center station platform in November 2022

General information
- Location: 12023-A Sunset Hills Road; Reston, Virginia
- Coordinates: 38°57′10″N 77°21′37″W
- Platforms: 1 island platform
- Tracks: 2
- Connections: Fairfax Connector: 553, 605, 950, 951, 952, RIBS 1, RIBS 2, RIBS 3, RIBS 4, RIBS 5; Loudoun County Transit: 312

Construction
- Structure type: At-grade
- Cycle facilities: Capital Bikeshare, 40 racks, 22 lockers
- Accessible: Yes

Other information
- Station code: N07

History
- Opened: November 15, 2022

Passengers
- 2025: 1,207 (average weekday)
- Rank: 93 of 98

Services
Preceding station	Washington Metro	Following station
Herndon toward Ashburn	Silver Line	Wiehle–Reston East toward Downtown Largo or New Carrollton
Route map
Location

Reston Town Center station (preliminary name Reston Parkway) is a rapid transit station on the Silver Line of the Washington Metro in Reston, an unincorporated area in northern Virginia, United States. It opened on November 15, 2022.

The station is located in the central section of Reston, within the median of SR 267 (Dulles Toll Road) west of its interchange with SR 602 (Reston Parkway). Reston Town Center is approximately 2,000 ft (610 m) to the north of the station. The station has a single island platform with two tracks. Two pedestrian bridges cross the highway, linking the station to bus bays and kiss and ride lots on either side.

== History ==
The Silver Line was developed in the 21st century to link Washington, D.C., by rail to Washington Dulles International Airport and the edge cities of Tysons, Reston, Herndon, and Ashburn. It was built in two phases; the first phase, linking Washington, D.C., to Wiehle–Reston East, opened in 2014. The funding and planning of Phase 2 through Dulles Airport continued while Phase 1 was being constructed. In 2012, the Loudoun County Board of Supervisors voted 5 to 4 to extend the line to Dulles Airport and into the county. On April 25, 2013, the Phase 2 contract was issued at a cost of $1.177 billion.

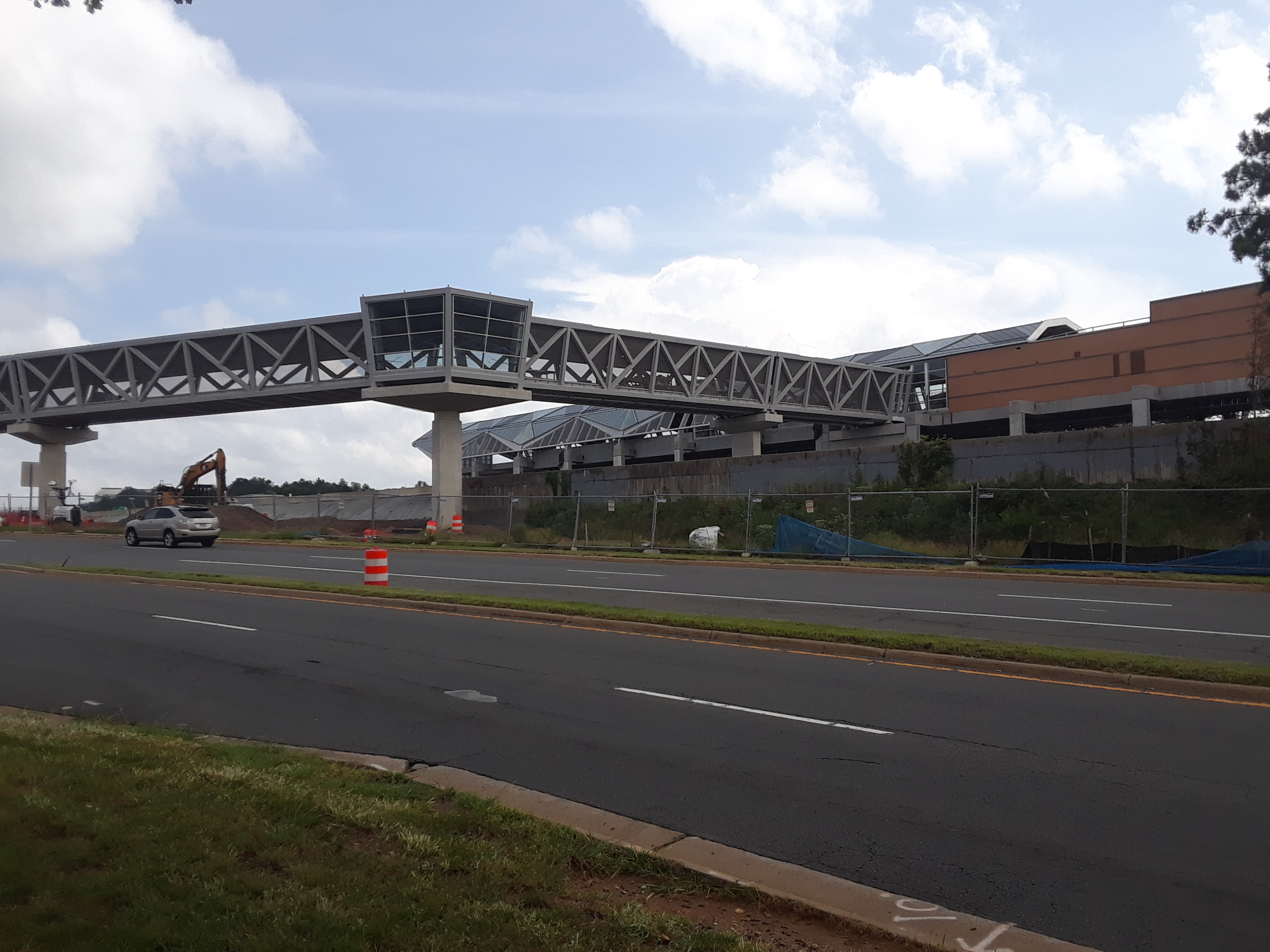
The station under construction in September 2018.

In April 2015, project officials pushed back the opening date for the station to late 2019, stating that stricter requirements for stormwater management caused much of the delay. Per officials, the line also had to incorporate improvements to the system's automated train controls that were a late addition to the project's first phase. In August 2019, project officials reported that they expected construction on the second phase of the Silver Line to be completed by mid-2020. The opening date was postponed to early 2021, then to late 2021. In February 2021, Metro announced that it would need five months to test the Phase 2 extension. The Metropolitan Washington Airports Authority (MWAA) then announced that the Phase 2 extension should be substantially complete by Labor Day 2021, although MWAA subsequently missed this deadline.

MWAA declared the work on the rail line to be "substantially complete" in November 2021. However, WMATA estimated that it could take five months of testing and other preparations before passenger service could begin. Simulated service testing began operating along the Phase 2 tracks in October 2022. Phase 2 formally opened on November 15, 2022.

== Transit-oriented development ==
As with all stations on the Silver Line within Fairfax County, the Fairfax County Planning Commission aims to transform the surrounding area into a mixed-use, dense, and walkable neighborhood connected to Reston Town Center. The Planning Commission has delineated an area bounded by New Dominion Parkway, Reston Parkway, Sunset Hills Road, Sunrise Valley Drive, and Fairfax County Parkway for transit-oriented development. The vast majority of the precinct is devoted to mixed-use zoning, while some outlying areas are designated for office, industrial, or government use.
