= Innovation Center station =

Washington Metro station in Virginia, US

Innovation Center
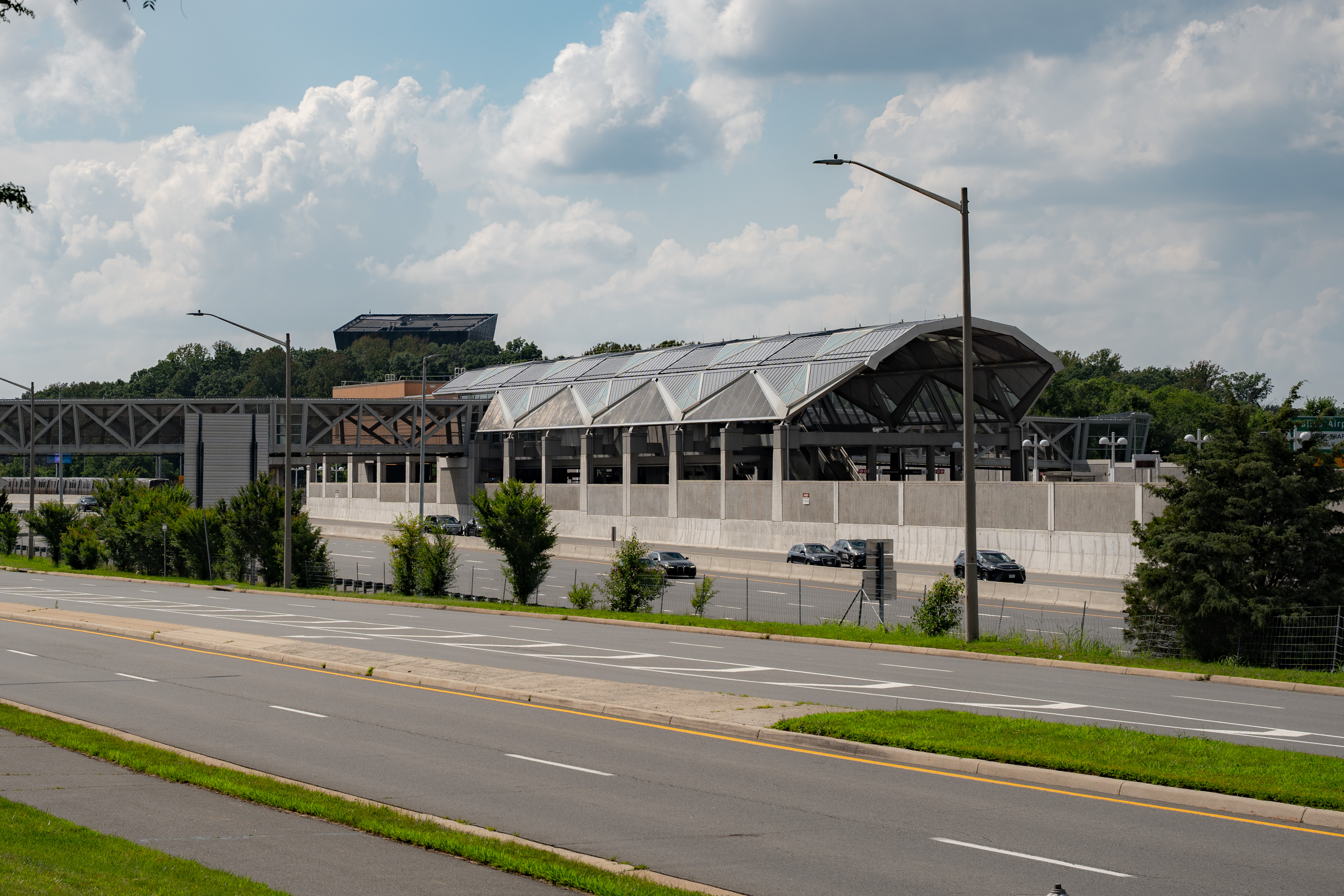
- Innovation Center station in June 2025

General information
- Location: 13747-A Sunrise Valley Drive; Herndon, Virginia
- Coordinates: 38°57′39″N 77°24′56″W
- Owner: Washington Metropolitan Area Transit Authority
- Platforms: 1 island platform
- Tracks: 2
- Connections: Fairfax Connector: 552, 937, 951, 983; Loudoun County Transit: 320, 321, 322, 323

Construction
- Structure type: At-grade
- Parking: 2,000 spaces
- Cycle facilities: 177 racks, 10 lockers, secure storage room
- Accessible: Yes

Other information
- Station code: N09

History
- Opened: November 15, 2022

Passengers
- 2025: 1,095 (average weekday)
- Rank: 94 of 98

Services
Preceding station	Washington Metro	Following station
Dulles International Airport toward Ashburn	Silver Line	Herndon toward Downtown Largo or New Carrollton
Route map
Location

Innovation Center station is a Washington Metro station in Fairfax County, Virginia, United States, on the Silver Line. It is located adjacent to the Virginia Center for Innovative Technology at the intersection of the SR 267 and SR 28 in McNair, near the Fairfax / Loudoun county line. Originally planned to begin operation in 2016, the station opened on November 15, 2022.

Facilities for the station include two pedestrian bridges across SR 267, leading to bus bays and kiss and ride lots at both entrances, as well as parking for 2,000 cars at the south entrance.

== History ==
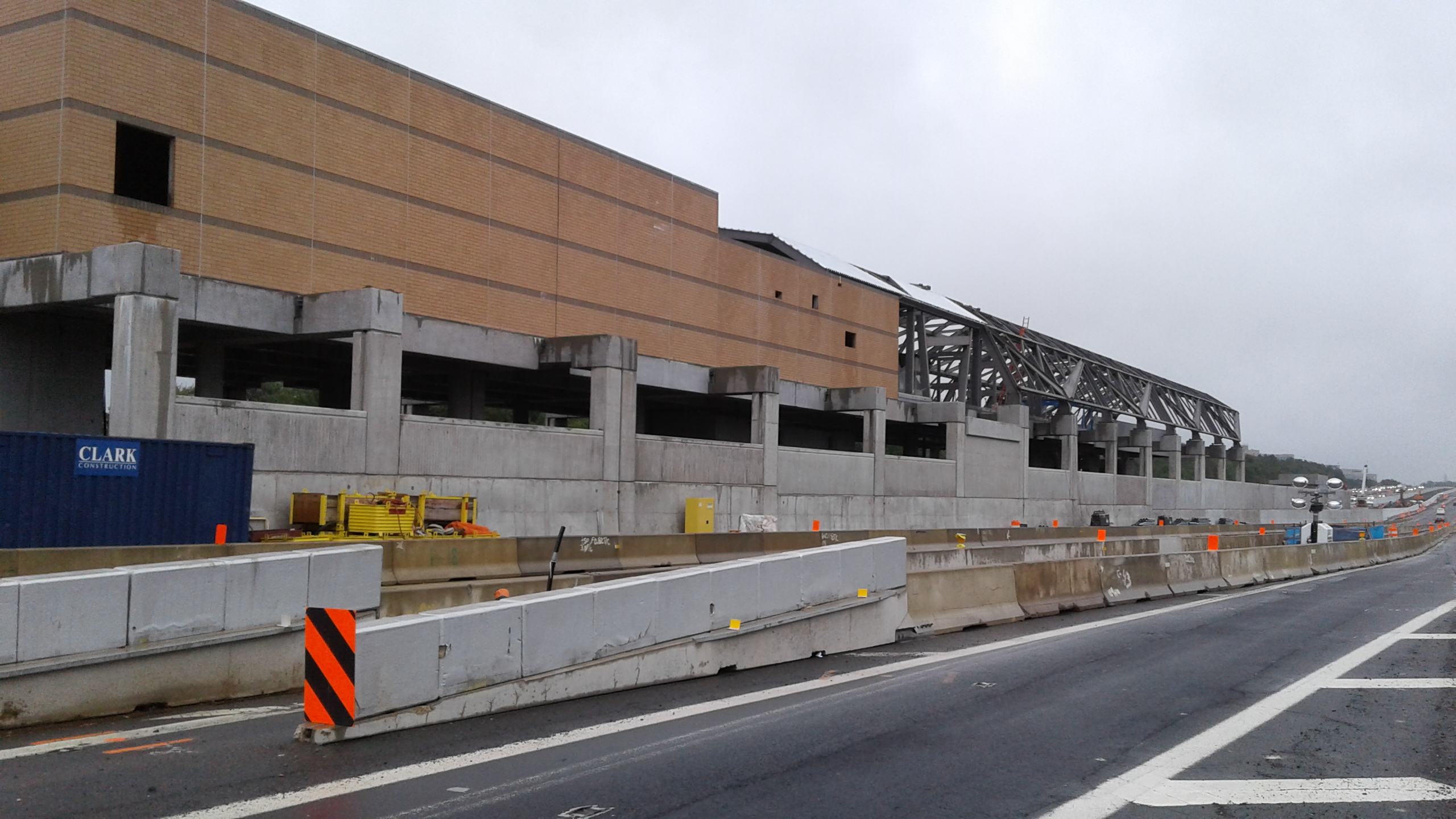
The station under construction in September 2016

The Silver Line was developed in the 21st century to link Washington, D.C., by rail to Washington Dulles International Airport and the edge cities of Tysons, Reston, Herndon, and Ashburn. It was built in two phases; the first phase, linking Washington, D.C., to Wiehle–Reston East, opened in 2014. Preliminary names for the station were Route 28 and Herndon – Dulles East.The funding and planning of Phase 2 through Dulles Airport continued while Phase 1 was being constructed. In 2012, the Loudoun County Board of Supervisors voted 5 to 4 to extend the line to Dulles Airport and into the county. On April 25, 2013, the Phase 2 contract was issued at a cost of $1.177 billion.

In April 2015, project officials pushed back the opening date for the station to late 2019, stating that stricter requirements for stormwater management caused much of the delay. Per officials, the line also had to incorporate improvements to the system's automated train controls that were a late addition to the project's first phase. In August 2019, project officials reported that they expected construction on the second phase of the Silver Line to be completed by mid-2020. The opening date was postponed to early 2021, then to late 2021. In February 2021, Metro announced that it would need five months to test the Phase 2 extension. The Metropolitan Washington Airports Authority (MWAA) then announced that the Phase 2 extension should be substantially complete by Labor Day 2021, although MWAA subsequently missed this deadline.

MWAA declared the work on the rail line to be "substantially complete" in November 2021. However, WMATA estimated that it could take five months of testing and other preparations before passenger service could begin. Simulated service testing began operating along the Phase 2 tracks in October 2022. Phase 2 formally opened on November 15, 2022. In March 2026, a direct pedestrian path connecting the station's north entrance to neighborhoods in Hutchison opened.

On April 20, 2026, an approximately two-million mixed-use development broke ground north of Innovation Center station. The site is planned to have office and residential units. The project was approved in 2023.
