= Dulles International Airport =

Airport in Dulles, Virginia, United States

Washington Dulles International Airport

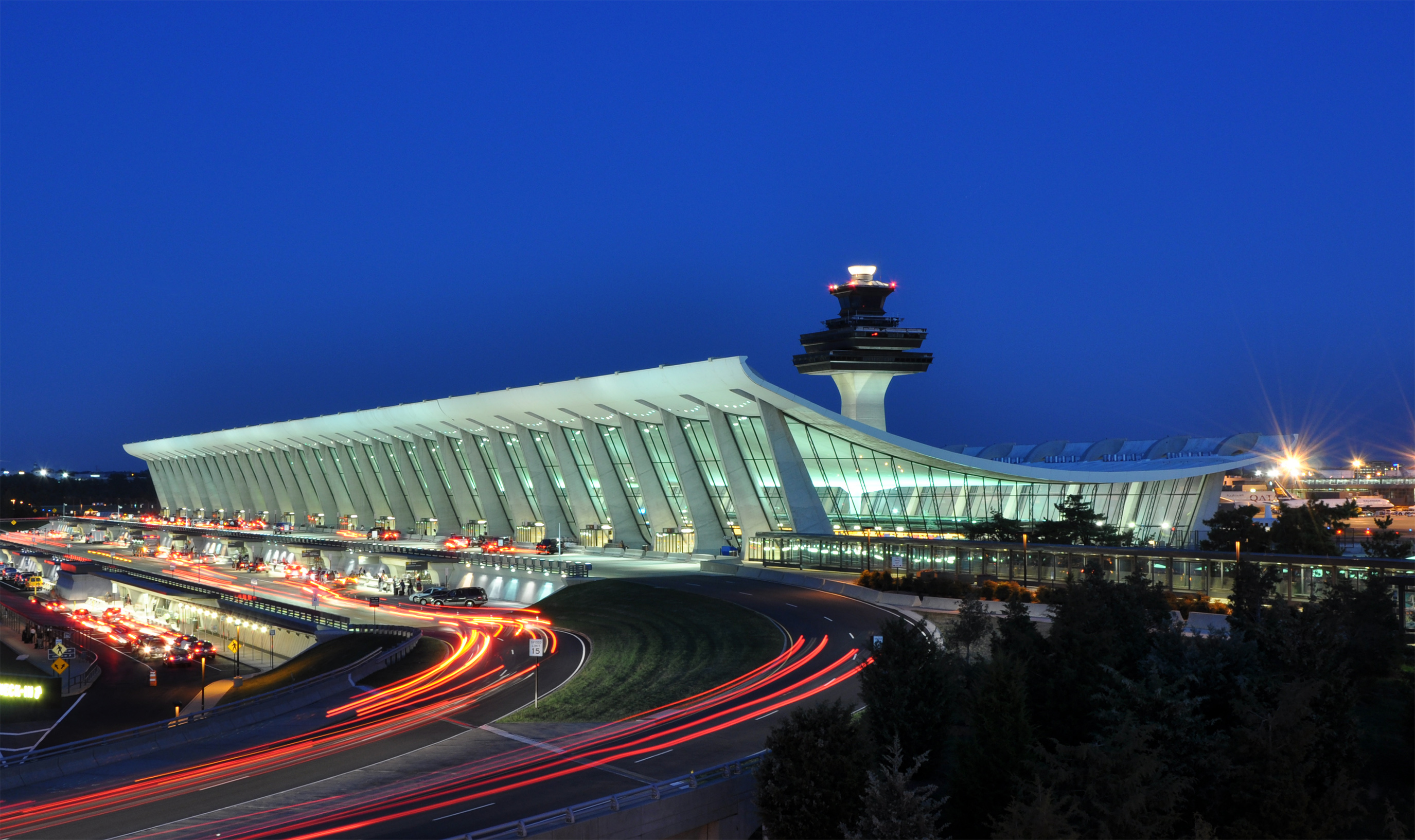
- The Main Terminal at dusk in August 2011
- IATA: IAD; ICAO: KIAD; FAA LID: IAD; WMO: 72403

Summary
- Airport type: Public
- Owner: United States federal government
- Operator: Metropolitan Washington Airports Authority
- Serves: Washington metropolitan area
- Location: Dulles, Virginia, U.S.
- Opened: November 17, 1962; 64 years ago
- Hub for: United Airlines
- Time zone: EST (UTC−05:00)
  - Summer (DST): EDT (UTC−04:00)
- Elevation AMSL: 312 ft (95 m)
- Coordinates: 38°56′40″N 077°27′21″W
- Website: flydulles.com

Maps
- FAA airport diagram
- Interactive map of Washington Dulles International Airport

Runways
Direction	Length		Surface
Direction	m	ft	Surface
01L/19R	2,865	9,400	Concrete
01C/19C	3,505	11,500	Concrete
01R/19L	3,505	11,500	Concrete
12/30	3,201	10,501	Concrete
12R/30L	3,200	10,500	Planned

Statistics (2025)
- Aircraft operations: 293,019
- Total passengers: 29,008,839 ▲6.4%
- Total cargo (metric Tons): 202,334
- Source: Federal Aviation Administration, Passenger traffic

Washington Dulles International Airport (/ˈdʌlɪs/ DUL-iss; IATA: IAD, ICAO: KIAD, FAA LID: IAD) is the primary international airport serving Washington, D.C., the capital of the United States. It is located 26 miles (42 km) west of downtown Washington, D.C., in Loudoun and Fairfax counties in Northern Virginia.

Opened in 1962, the airport is named after John Foster Dulles, an influential secretary of state during the Cold War who briefly represented New York in the United States Senate. Operated by the Metropolitan Washington Airports Authority, Dulles occupies 13,000 acres (20.3 sq mi; 52.6 km^{2}); IAD ranks fourth in the United States in terms of land area, after Denver International Airport, Dallas Fort Worth International Airport, and Southwest Florida International Airport. Its Eero Saarinen-designed Main Terminal has received acclaim and awards for its architecture.

As of 2024, it is the 24th-busiest airport in the United States, with 27.3 million enplanements. It had more than 20 million passenger enplanements every year from 2004 to 2019. An average of 60,000 passengers pass through Dulles daily to and from more than 139 destinations around the world. Dulles has the most international passenger traffic of any airport in the Mid-Atlantic outside the New York metropolitan area, including approximately 90% of the international passenger traffic in the Baltimore–Washington region.

In 2025, IAD Airport set an all-time record with 29,008,839 passengers served, a 6.4% increase over 2024.

Dulles is a hub for United Airlines, and it is frequently used by Star Alliance members that United has codeshare agreements with. Dulles is also a hub for regional operators Mesa, GoJet, and CommuteAir, which operate under the United Express brand.

== History ==
=== Origins ===
Before World War II, Hoover Field was the main commercial airport serving Washington, on the site now occupied by the Pentagon and its parking lots. It was replaced by Washington National Airport in 1941, a short distance southeast. After the war, in 1948, the Civil Aeronautics Administration began to consider sites for a second major airport to serve the nation's capital. Congress passed the Washington Airport Act in 1950 to provide funding for a new airport in the region. The initial CAA proposal in 1951 called for the airport to be built in Fairfax County near what is now Burke Lake Park, but protests from residents, as well as the rapid expansion of Washington's suburbs during the time, led to reconsideration of this plan. One competing plan called for the airport to be built in the Pender area of Fairfax County, while another called for the conversion of Andrews Air Force Base in Prince George's County, Maryland, into a commercial airport.

The current site was selected by President Dwight D. Eisenhower in 1958. The Dulles name was chosen by Eisenhower's aviation advisor Pete Quesada, who later served as the first head of the Federal Aviation Administration. As a result of the site selection, the unincorporated largely African-American community of Willard, which once stood in the airport's current footprint, was demolished, and 87 property owners had their holdings condemned.

=== Design and construction ===
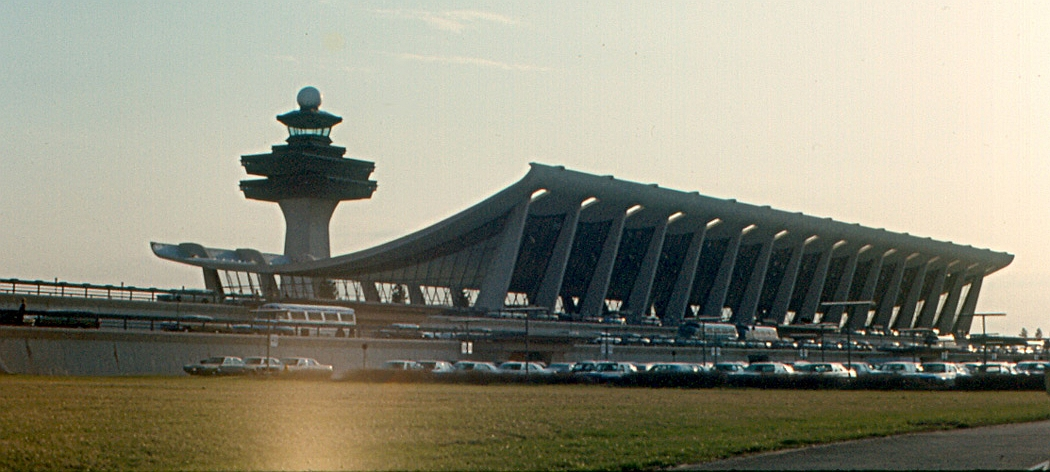
Dulles Airport in April 1970, showing the main terminal's original size

The civil engineering firm Ammann and Whitney was named lead contractor. The airport was dedicated by President John F. Kennedy and Eisenhower on November 17, 1962. As originally opened, the airport had three long runways (current day runways 1C/19C, 1R/19L, and 12/30) and one shorter one (where current taxiway Q is located). Its original name, Dulles International Airport, was changed in 1984 to Washington Dulles International Airport.

The main terminal was designed in 1958 by famed Finnish-American architect Eero Saarinen, and it is highly regarded for its graceful beauty, suggestive of flight. The terminal was built without any concourses and gates as all aircraft were parked at remote sites. Passengers were bussed to their aircraft by way of mobile lounges that raised up to the aircraft level; some are still in use today. The first midfield terminal that included gates and jetbridges was constructed in 1985 when New York Air and other airlines began hub operations at Dulles. In the 1990s, the main terminal at Dulles was reconfigured to allow more space between the front of the building and the ticket counters. Additions at both ends of the main terminal more than doubled the structure's length. The original terminal at Taiwan Taoyuan International Airport in Taoyuan, Taiwan, was modeled after the Saarinen terminal at Dulles.

The design included a landscaped man-made lake to collect rainwater, a low-rise hotel, and a row of office buildings along the north side of the main parking lot. The design also included a two-level road in front of the terminal to separate arrival and departure traffic and a federally owned limited access highway connecting the terminal to the Capital Beltway (I-495) about 17 miles (27 km) to the east; the highway system eventually grew to include a parallel toll road to handle commuter traffic and an extension to connect to I-66. The access road had a wide median strip to allow the construction of a passenger rail line, which opened as an extension of the Washington Metro's Silver Line on November 15, 2022.

==== Later developments ====
By 1985 the original design, featuring mobile lounges to meet each plane, was no longer well-suited to Dulles's role as a hub airport. Instead, midfield concourses were constructed to allow passengers to walk between connecting flights without visiting the main terminal. Mobile lounges were still used for international flights and to transport passengers between the midfield concourses and the main terminal; Concourse C/D was the first to be built, followed by Concourse A/B. A tunnel (consisting of a passenger walkway and moving sidewalks) that links the main terminal and Concourse B was opened in 2004. The Metropolitan Washington Airports Authority (MWAA) began a renovation program for the airport including a new security mezzanine with more room for lines.

A new train system, dubbed AeroTrain and developed by Mitsubishi, began in 2010 to transport passengers between the concourses and the main terminal. The system, which uses rubber tires and travels along a fixed underground guideway, is similar to the people mover systems at Singapore Changi Airport, Hartsfield–Jackson Atlanta International Airport, and Denver International Airport. The train is intended to replace the mobile lounges, which many passengers found crowded and inconvenient. The initial phase includes the main terminal station, a permanent Concourse A station, a permanent Concourse B station, a permanent midfield concourse station (with access to the current temporary C concourse via a tunnel with moving walkways), and a maintenance facility.

Under the development plan, future phases would see the addition of several new midfield concourses and a new south terminal. A fourth runway (parallel to the existing runways 1 and 19 L&R) opened in 2008, and development plans include a fifth runway to parallel the existing runway 12–30. If this runway is built, the current runway will be re-designated as 12L-30R while the new runway will be designated 12R-30L. An expansion of the B concourse, used by many low-cost airlines as well as international arrivals, has been completed, and the building housing Concourses C and D will eventually be knocked down to make room for a more ergonomic building. Because Concourses C and D are temporary concourses, the only way to get to those concourses is via moving walkway from the Concourse C station, which is built in the location of the future gates and Concourse D by mobile lounge from the main terminal.

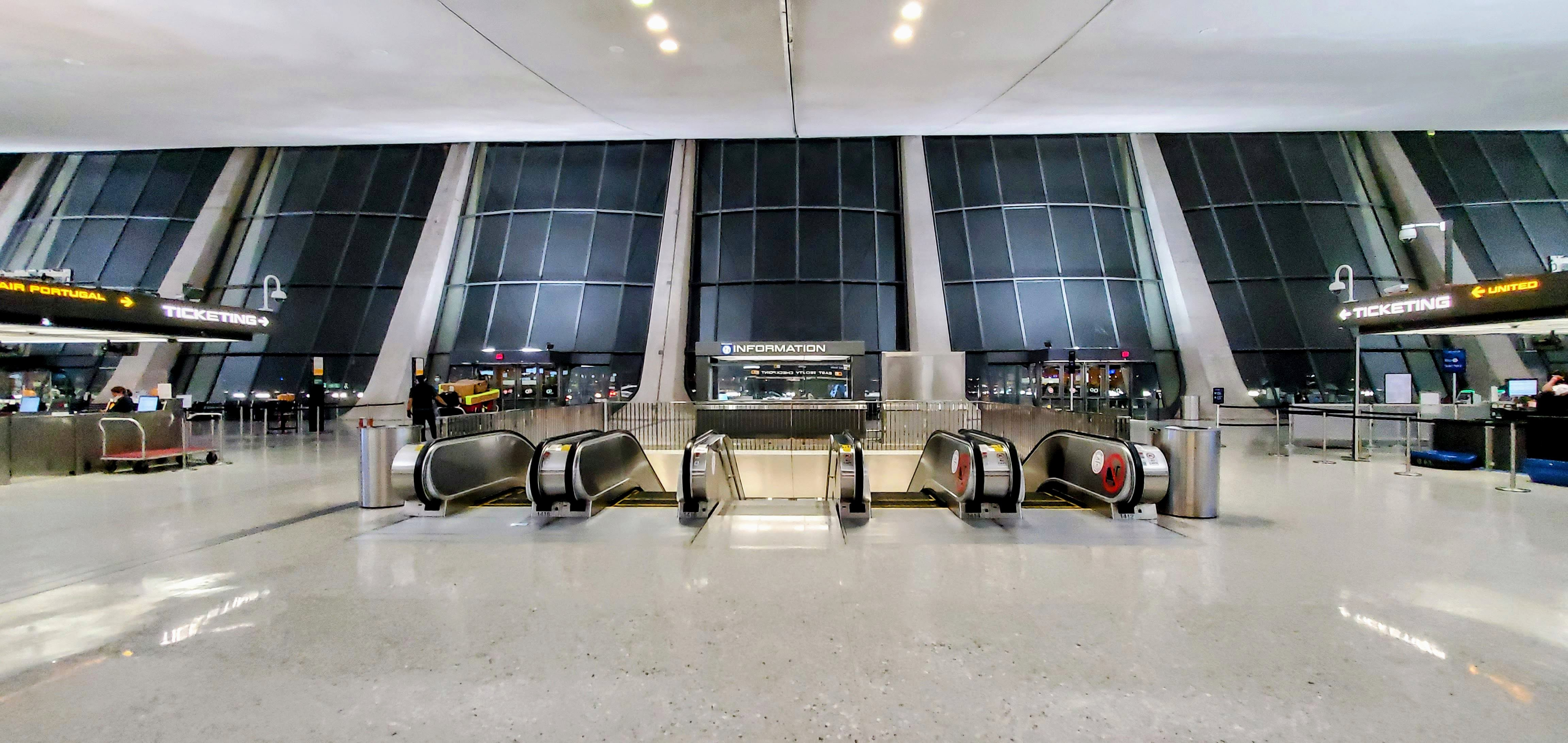
The interior of the main terminal, showing the escalators leading to baggage claim and arrivals

In the short term, United Airlines has constructed a 20,000 square foot (1,900 m^{2}) buildout on Concourse C between gate C18 and the AeroTrain entrance for use as a Polaris Lounge for international passengers. Further expansion plans include a new three-story 550,000 square foot (51,000 m^{2}) south concourse building above the AeroTrain station for Concourse C, to replace Concourse A regional gates built in 1999.

Decades-old rules set by Congress that limit the number of takeoffs and landings, as well as distance of routes, at Reagan Airport were intended in part to keep more flights at Dulles. Those rules have been weakened by Congress over the years, however, causing Dulles to lose 200,000 passengers to Reagan between 2011 and 2013.

In 2023, construction started on a 100 MW solar power facility, battery and bus charging equipment. It would include the largest airport-based solar and battery development in the U.S. as part of an agreement with Dominion Energy. The solar panels would cover more than 835 acres (338 ha) on land, equivalent to the consumption of more than 37,000 Northern Virginia homes during peak production.

=== Operations and milestones ===
==== Early years ====
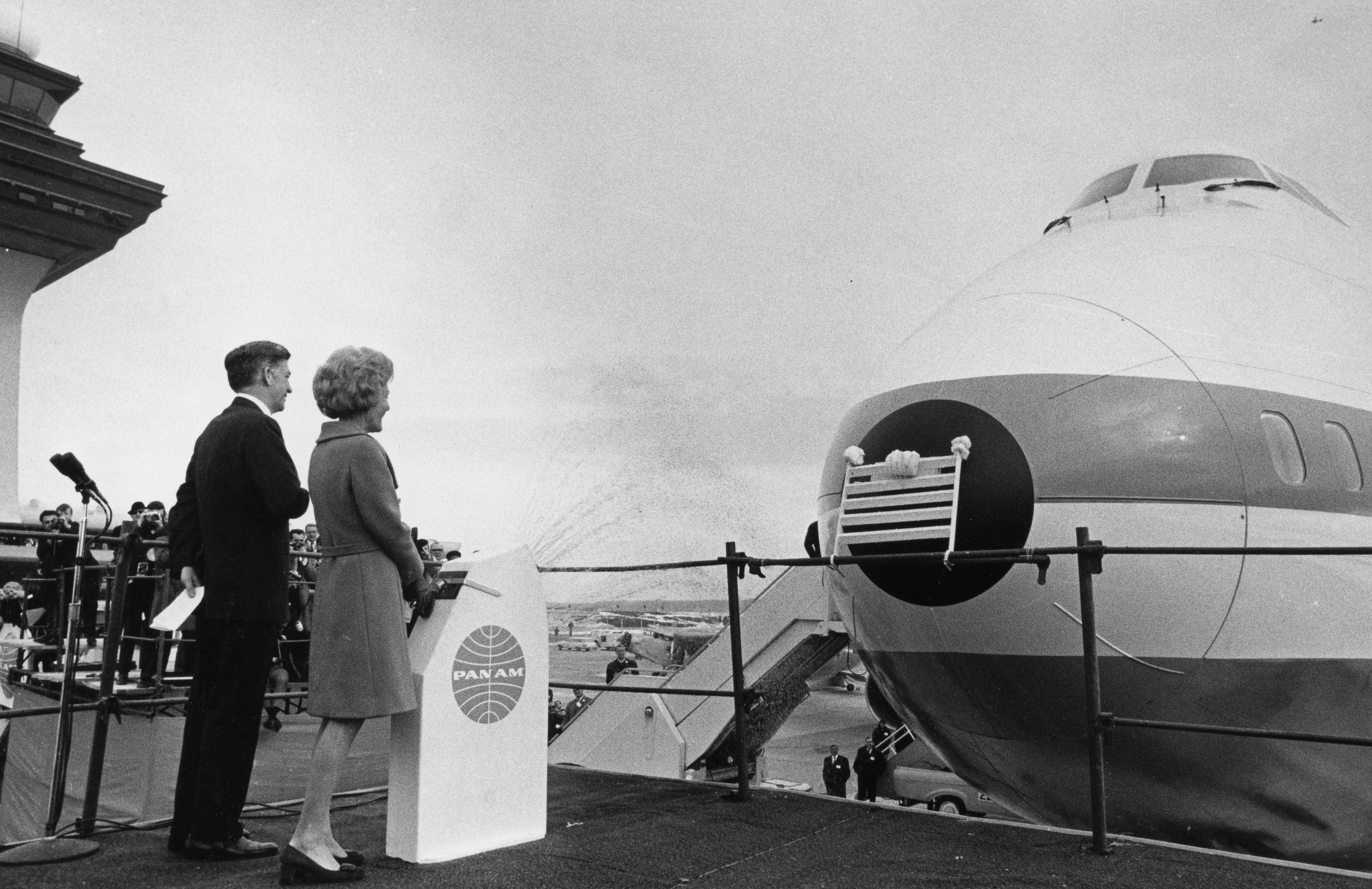
First Lady Pat Nixon christening the first Boeing 747 at Dulles on January 15, 1970.

The first scheduled flight at Dulles was an Eastern Air Lines Lockheed L-188 Super Electra from Newark International Airport in New Jersey on November 19, 1962. The first scheduled transatlantic nonstop flight to serve the airport commenced just shy of two years later, in June 1964.

Dulles was initially considered a white elephant, being far out of town with few flights; in 1965, Dulles averaged 89 airline operations a day while National Airport (now Reagan) averaged 600 despite not allowing jets. Airport operations grew along with Virginia suburbs and the Dulles Technology Corridor; perimeter and slot restrictions at National forced long-distance flights to use Dulles. In 1969, Dulles had 2.01 million passengers while National had 9.9 million.

==== Growth ====
Impromptu interviews with commuters at Dulles terminal in 1979

The era of wide-body jets began in 1970, when First Lady Pat Nixon christened a Pan Am Boeing 747-100 at Dulles in the presence of Pan Am chairman Najeeb Halaby. Rather than a traditional champagne bottle, red, white, and blue water was sprayed on the aircraft. Pan Am's first Boeing 747 flight was from New York–JFK to London Heathrow Airport.

The day after Christmas 1973, President Richard Nixon flew from Dulles to Los Angeles on board a United Airlines McDonnell Douglas DC-10 commercial flight instead of on Air Force One. This was due to a nationwide fuel shortage caused at the time by the Arab oil embargo. Less than two years later, on May 24, 1976, supersonic flights between the U.S. and Europe began with the arrival of a British Airways Concorde from London–Heathrow and an Air France Concorde from Paris–Charles De Gaulle; both planes were lined nose-to-nose at Dulles for photos.

In 1983, the Space Shuttle Enterprise arrived at Dulles atop a modified Boeing 747 after touring Europe and before returning to Edwards Air Force Base. Two years later Enterprise returned and was placed in a storage hangar near Runway 12/30 to await construction of a planned expansion to the National Air and Space Museum. Enterprise left Dulles in 2012 for its new home at the Intrepid Sea, Air & Space Museum in New York City.

In 1985, New York Air began a small hub operation at Dulles, with 35 daily flights to eight cities in Florida and the northeastern United States. Colgan Airways became a feeder carrier for New York Air with additional service to smaller cities known as New York Air Connection. In 1987, the airline merged into Continental Airlines, which maintained the hub operation until 1989. Also in 1985, Presidential Airways opened its hub at the airport, and it soon began a series of code-shares – first with Pan Am from mid-1986 through early 1988, then as Continental Express on behalf of Continental Airlines between mid-1987 and mid-1988, and finally as United Express, on behalf of United Airlines, from mid 1988 until Presidential ceased operations on December 5, 1989.

==== United hub years, 1986 – present ====
In 1986, United Airlines began service on 16 new domestic routes creating a hub status at Dulles. Many more domestic routes and new overseas routes would later be added. Air Wisconsin and Presidential Airways soon became feeder carriers for United operating as United Express.

When the SR-71 was retired by the military in 1990, one model was flown from its birthplace at United States Air Force Plant 42 in Palmdale, California, to Dulles, setting a coast-to-coast speed record at an average 2,124 mph (3,418 km/h); the trip took 64 minutes. The aircraft was placed in a storage building, and is now displayed at the Smithsonian's adjacent Udvar-Hazy Air and Space Museum.

In 1995, the first flight of the Boeing 777-200 in commercial service landed at Dulles; the flight was operated by United Airlines on its transatlantic London Heathrow – Washington Dulles route.

==== 21st century ====
The 2004 launch of low-cost carrier Independence Air propelled IAD from being the 24th-busiest airport in the United States to fourth, and one of the top 30 busiest in the world. Independence Air ceased operations in January 2006, and its space in Concourse A was taken five months later by United Express. Southwest Airlines began service from Dulles in 2006, maintaining service in various forms for two decades before pulling out in 2026.

Significant growth required the airport to halt the operations of its original control tower in 2007 for a taller control tower located away from the main terminal. The original tower still exists, though it is no longer used to control the airport's traffic. That year, 24.7 million passengers passed through the airport.

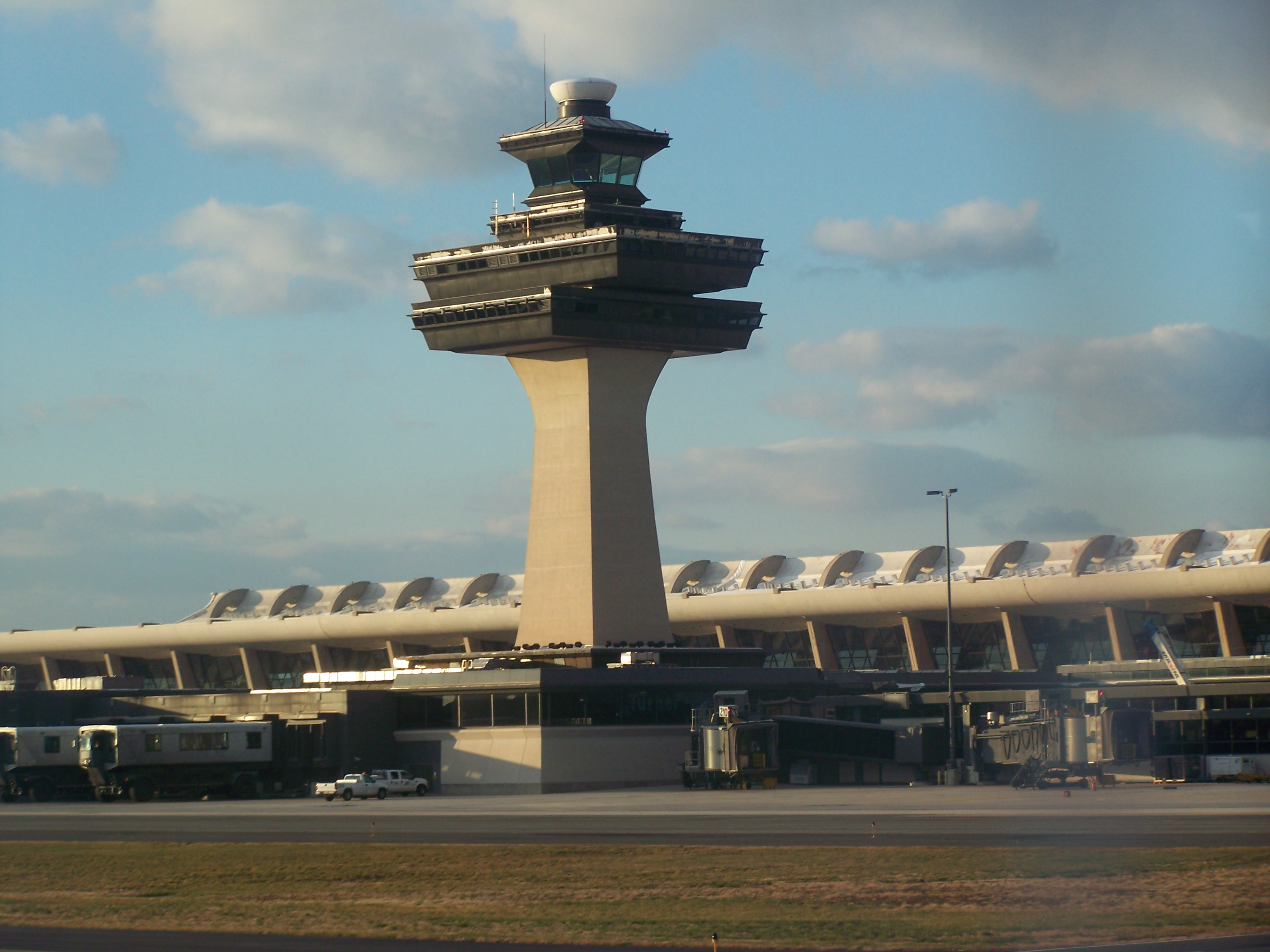
Dulles' old air traffic control tower, which halted operations in 2007

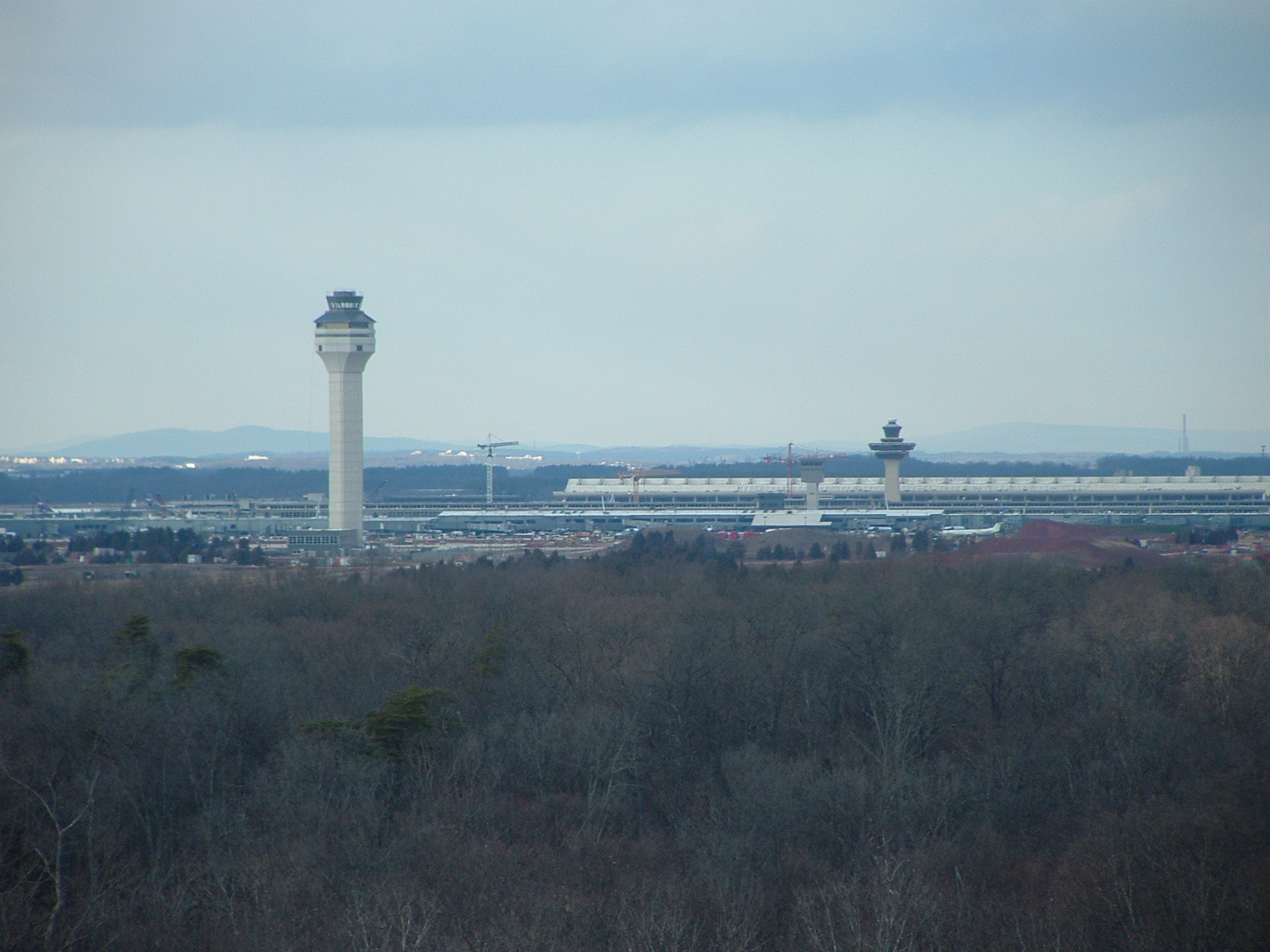
The current air traffic control tower dwarfs the original one

In 2008, a third parallel north–south runway – Runway 1L/19R – opened on the west side of the airfield; the original 1L/19R was re-designated 1C/19C. It was the first new runway to be built at Dulles since the airport's construction.

In 2011, the airport received its first Airbus A380 flights when Air France introduced the A380 on its nonstop from Paris Charles de Gaulle Airport during peak season. The following year, the first passenger flight of the Boeing 747-8 Intercontinental – operated by Lufthansa with service from Frankfurt to Washington – landed at IAD. Ethiopian Airlines began operating service to Dulles using the Boeing 787 Dreamliner.

In 2012, the Space Shuttle Discovery was ferried to Dulles mounted to a NASA 747-100 as part of its decommissioning and installation in the Steven F. Udvar-Hazy Center.

In the early 2010s, increased domestic travel from Reagan National Airport eroded some of Dulles's domestic routes. Dulles overtook Reagan in total enplanements in 2019.

In 2014, British Airways began using the Airbus A380 on flights from London–Heathrow to Dulles. Less than two years later, on February 1, 2016, Emirates upgraded its direct flights from Dubai International – a service previously operated using a Boeing 777 – to an Airbus A380. British Airways temporarily ended A380 flights in the latter half of the decade, reverting to a 747-400 twice daily during peak season but resumed its once-daily A380 operations during non-peak season in October 2019, before once again ending A380 service to Dulles in early 2020. By 2019, Washington Dulles was one of just fourteen airports in the United States seeing daily operations from and/or having at least one gate and one runway that can accommodate an Airbus A380.

In 2018, Volaris Costa Rica launched flights to Dulles, becoming the first international low-cost carrier to serve the airport. A few months later, on September 15, Cathay Pacific launched its longest nonstop route connecting Dulles to Hong Kong utilizing an Airbus A350-1000; the service was suspended indefinitely due to the COVID-19 pandemic.

In 2019, four new major international routes were added. Alitalia began non-stop service utilizing an Airbus A330 to Rome-Fiumicino, operating five times weekly during the peak summer season, reducing to three times weekly during the winter season. EgyptAir operates a Boeing 787–9 with nonstop service to Cairo three times a week year-round. TAP Air Portugal flies five times weekly with nonstop service to Lisbon on board the Airbus A321LR, A330-900 and sometimes the A330-200. By that May, United began non-stop service to Tel-Aviv, initially utilizing a Boeing 777-200ER on a thrice-weekly schedule.

In 2021, regional airline Southern Airways Express moved their East Coast hub from BWI to Dulles. The airline announced it would operate flights between Dulles and small airports in Pennsylvania and West Virginia, some of them on Essential Air Service contracts.

In 2022, the airport's Washington Metro station opened as part of the Phase 2 extension of the Silver Line, from Wiehle–Reston East station to Ashburn.

In 2024, IAD was ranked the 11th best airport in the world by AirHelp, a passenger rights tech company assisting passengers with flight disruptions. Data was compiled for 239 of the world's busiest airports in 69 countries. Data was compiled from May 1, 2023, to April 30, 2024. Criteria was based on on-time performance, customer opinion, and food and shops. Dulles' ranking was an overall 8.22 out of 10.

As of February 2025, more than 50 airlines serve the airport. The majority of the market share is United and United Express while other airlines focus on international routes or domestic routes not served by United. Airbus A380 service to Dulles during the current summer season puts the airport in 3rd place for A380 flights in the US, after New York–JFK and Los Angeles–LAX. British Airways and Lufthansa fly the superjumbo to Dulles on a daily schedule from May to October, while Emirates flies the A380 year round. Additionally, Dulles is looking to grow its international destinations in response to the regained demand for Southeast Asian service after the pandemic caused numbers to falter significantly. This growth would target cities like Mumbai, Taipei and Shanghai, as well as resume service to Hong Kong.

In 2025, Air China began serving IAD with the Boeing 747-8i from Beijing. Air China up until then served the airport twice weekly with the Boeing 777-300ER. This added a second Air China 747 flight to the US after JFK, which had been the only airport in the United States to receive Air China 747 service.

=== Name ===
John Foster Dulles was the Secretary of State under President Dwight Eisenhower. After Dulles had to resign in 1959 due to a cancer diagnosis and died a month later, Eisenhower advocated for the new Washington-area airport to be named after him in tribute. Eisenhower was present along with the current president, John F. Kennedy, at the airport dedication in 1962.

Dulles originally used DIA – the initials of Dulles International Airport – as its airport code. When handwritten, DIA was often misread as DCA – the code for Washington National Airport. This prompted officials to change Dulles Airport's code to IAD – standing for "International Airport Dulles."

In 1990, a United States Senate joint resolution to change Dulles International Airport's name to Washington Eisenhower International Airport was proposed by Senator Bob Dole, but the bill did not pass.

Beginning in 2024, an effort by Congress has been made to rename the airport as the Donald J. Trump International Airport, in honor of President Donald Trump. In April 2024, a bill was proposed in the United States House of Representatives to rename the airport after Trump, but did not pass. A new bill was introduced in the House of Representatives in January 2025, renewing the proposal to rename Dulles after Trump; this bill was announced a few days after a similar state bill was proposed in Tennessee, to rename Nashville International Airport after Trump.

== Terminals ==
The airport's terminal complex consists of the Main Terminal (which includes four aircraft gates, known as the "Z" Gates), and three parallel midfield terminal buildings: Concourses A/B, Concourses C/D, and Concourse E. The entire terminal complex has a total of 153 gates – 137 of which have jetways and 16 of which are hardstand locations from which passengers can board or disembark using the airport's plane mate vehicles.

=== Inter-terminal transportation ===
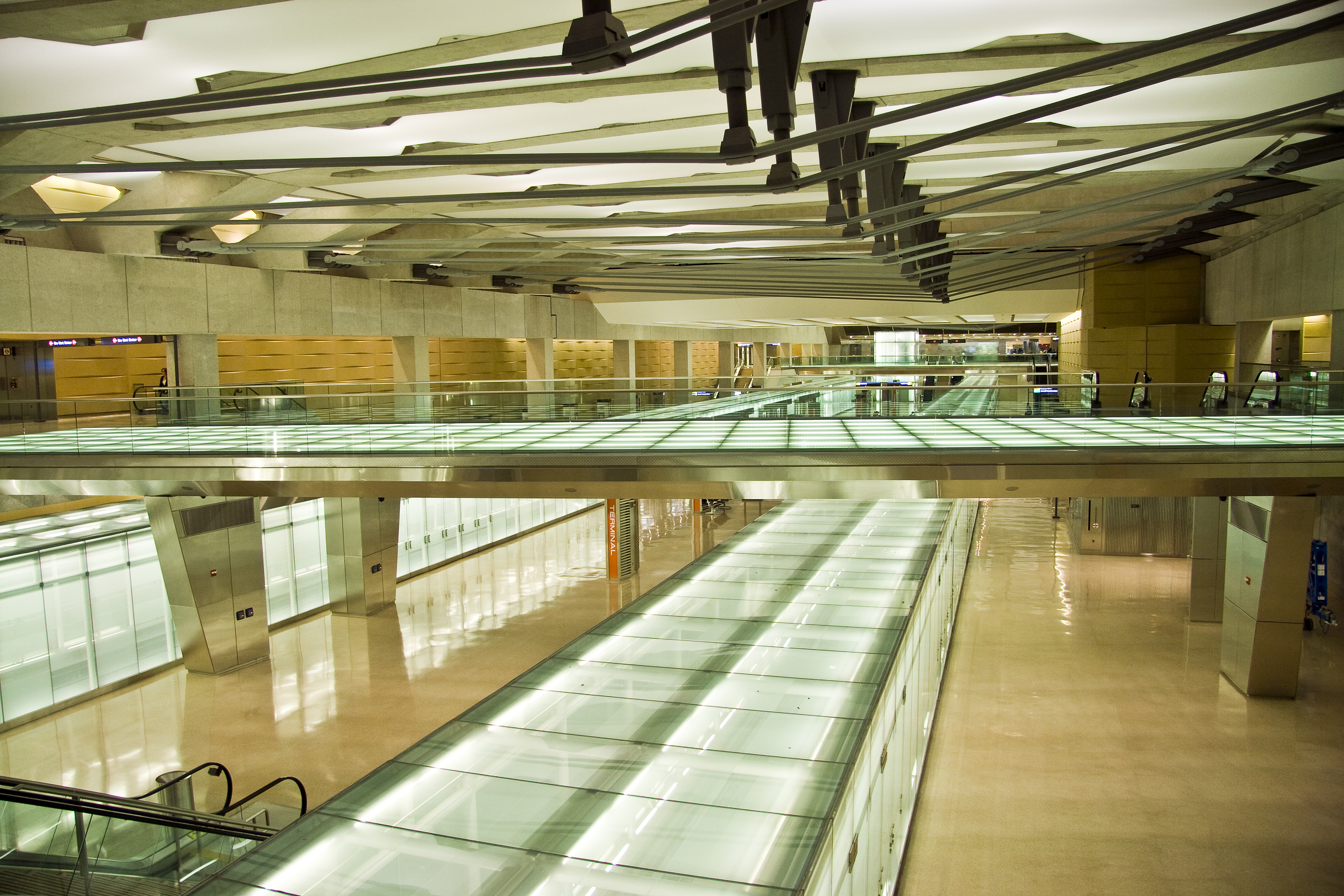
Main Terminal AeroTrain station

Conceived in early planning sessions in 1959, Dulles is one of a few remaining airports to utilize mobile lounges (also known as "plane mates" or "people movers"), now only used for transport to the International Arrivals Building as well as transport for Concourse D. They have all been given names based on the postal abbreviations of 50 states, e.g., VA, MD, AK.

The Metropolitan Washington Airports Authority has partially phased out the mobile lounge system for inter-terminal passenger movements with the AeroTrain, an underground people mover that currently operates to all of the concourses except concourse D, with a passenger tunnel remaining from the main terminal to Concourses A and B, as well as a tunnel connecting Concourse E with Concourse C. Plane mates remain in use to disembark international passengers and carry them to the International Arrivals Building, as well as to transport passengers to and from aircraft on the hard stands that are called H gates (i.e., those parked remotely on the apron without access to jet bridges).

=== Main terminal ===
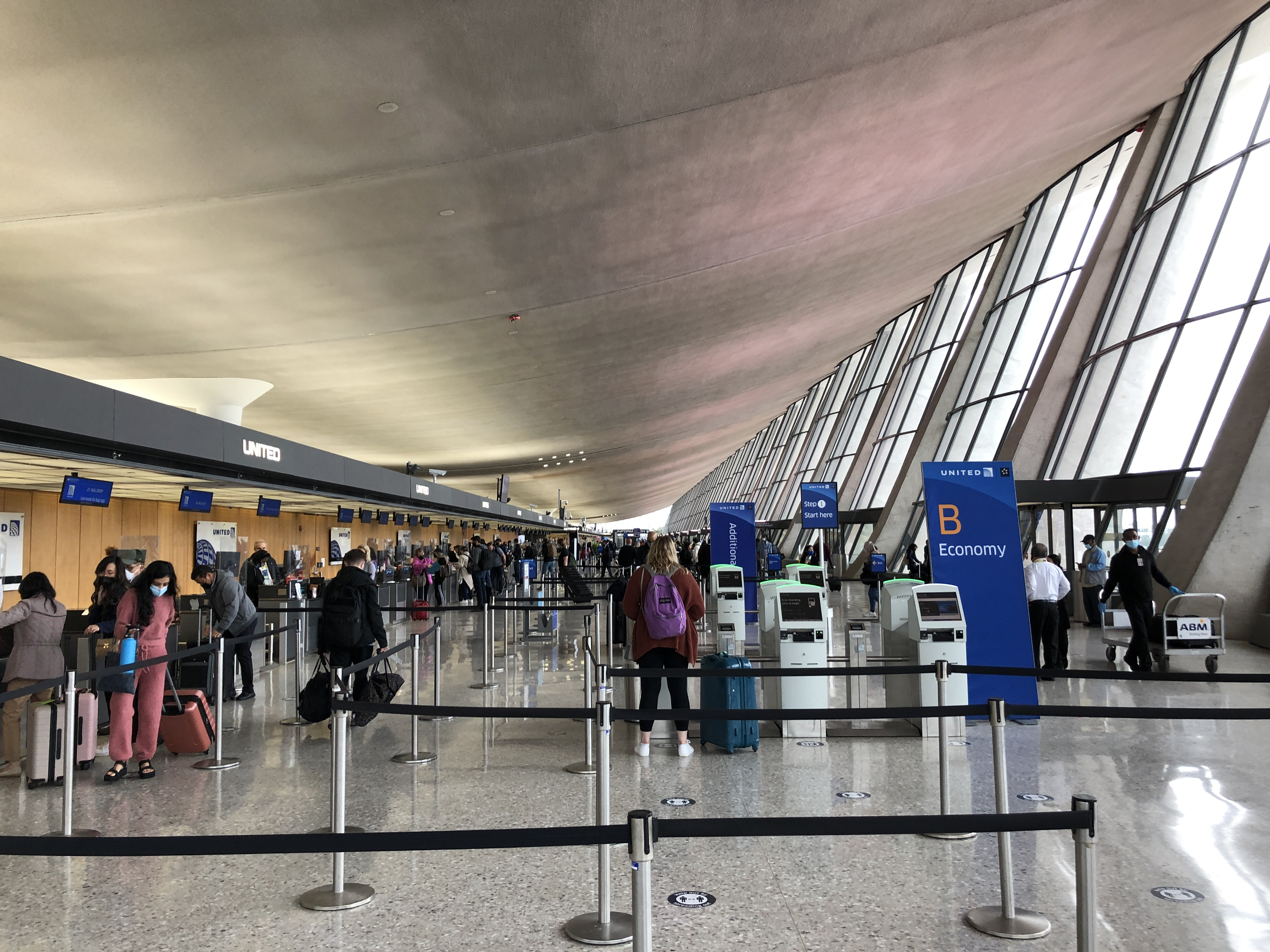
The Main Terminal's ceiling is suspended in a catenary curve above the check-in area

Dulles's main terminal houses ticketing on the upper level, baggage claim and U.S. Customs and Border Protection on the lower level, and annexes for the International Arrivals Building for international passenger processing, as well as the four Z gates (used by Air Canada and United Express), H gates, various information kiosks and other support facilities. The main terminal was recognized by the American Institute of Architects in 1966 for its design concept; its roof is a suspended catenary providing a wide enclosed area unimpeded by any columns. Its main terminal was designed by Eero Saarinen, who also designed the TWA Flight Center at John F. Kennedy International Airport.

The main terminal was extended in 1996 to 1,240 feet (380 m)—Saarinen's original design length—which was slightly more than double its originally constructed length of 600 feet (180 m). On September 22, 2009, an expansion to include the 41,400 square feet (3,850 m^{2}) International Arrivals Building opened for customs and immigration processing with a capacity to process 2,400 passengers per hour.

Also in September 2009, a 121,700 square feet (11,310 m^{2}) central security checkpoint was added on a new security mezzanine level of the main terminal. This checkpoint replaced previous checkpoints that were located behind the ticketing areas. Travelers enrolled in TSA PreCheck and CLEAR still use this area to clear security. A separate security checkpoint is available on the baggage claim level for staff only, and previously had access for all passengers as the Dulles Diamond area. Both public security checkpoints connect to escalators to the AeroTrain, which links the main terminal with Concourses A, B, and E, with access to Concourse C via a pedestrian tunnel from the Concourse E station.

=== Midfield terminals ===
All airlines aside from certain express flights operate out of five concourses spread across three linear satellite terminals. Each terminal save for the south terminal is divided into two concourses, with the north terminal containing Concourses A and B, the middle terminal containing Concourses C and D, and the south terminal containing Concourse E.

==== Concourses A and B ====
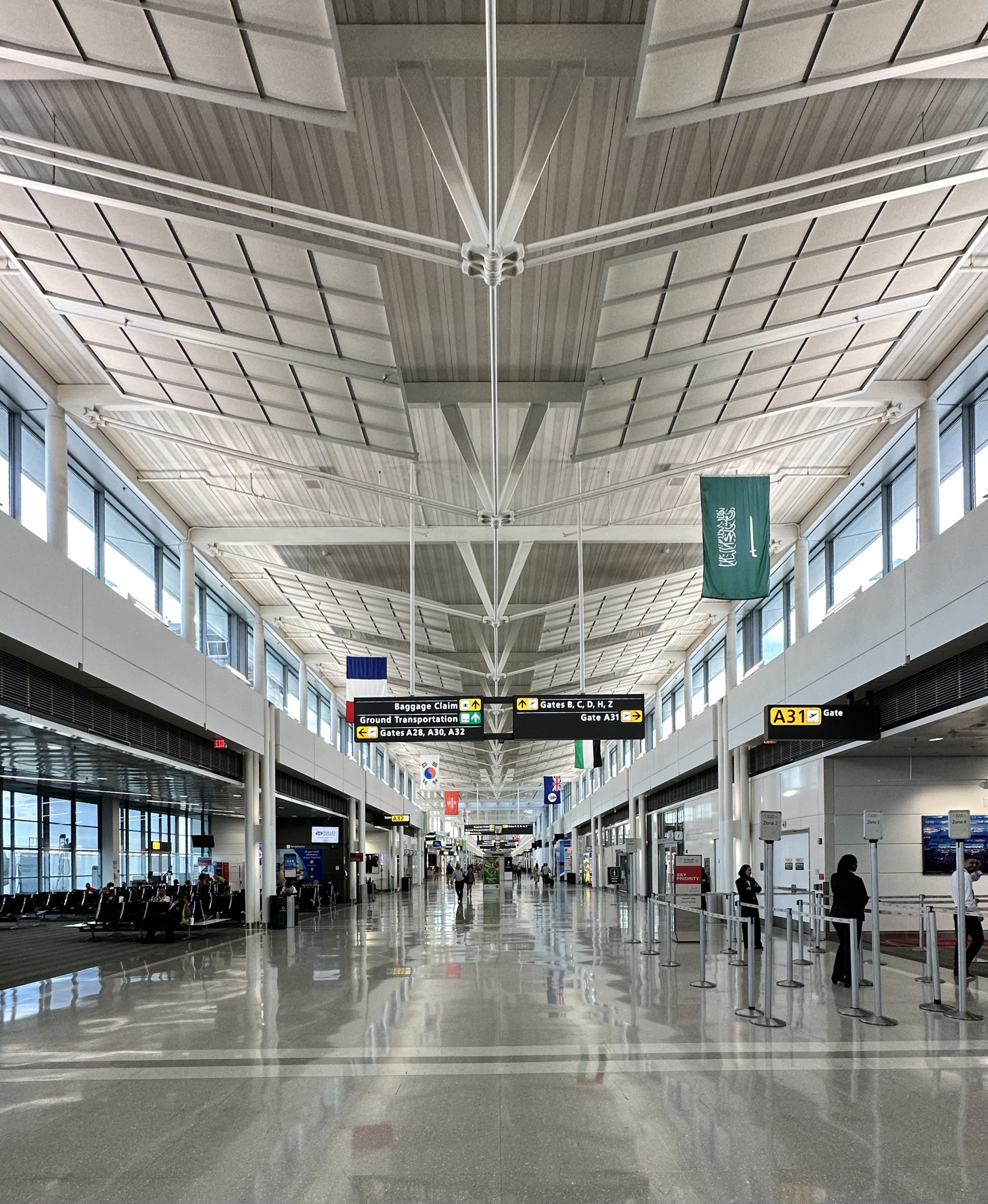
The interior of Concourses A & B.

Concourses A and B are located in the north midfield terminal building. They are utilized by all non-United flights as well as a limited number of United Express flights. Concourse A has 47 gates, located in the eastern half of the north midfield terminal. It consists of a permanent ground-level set of gates designed for small planes and United Express flights, and several former Concourse B gates. The concourse is primarily used for international flights. Air France and KLM have a lounge opposite gate A19, Etihad Airways operates a First and Business Class lounge across from gate A15, and Virgin Atlantic has a Clubhouse lounge adjacent to gate A31. Concourse A's AeroTrain station is located between gates A6 and A14.

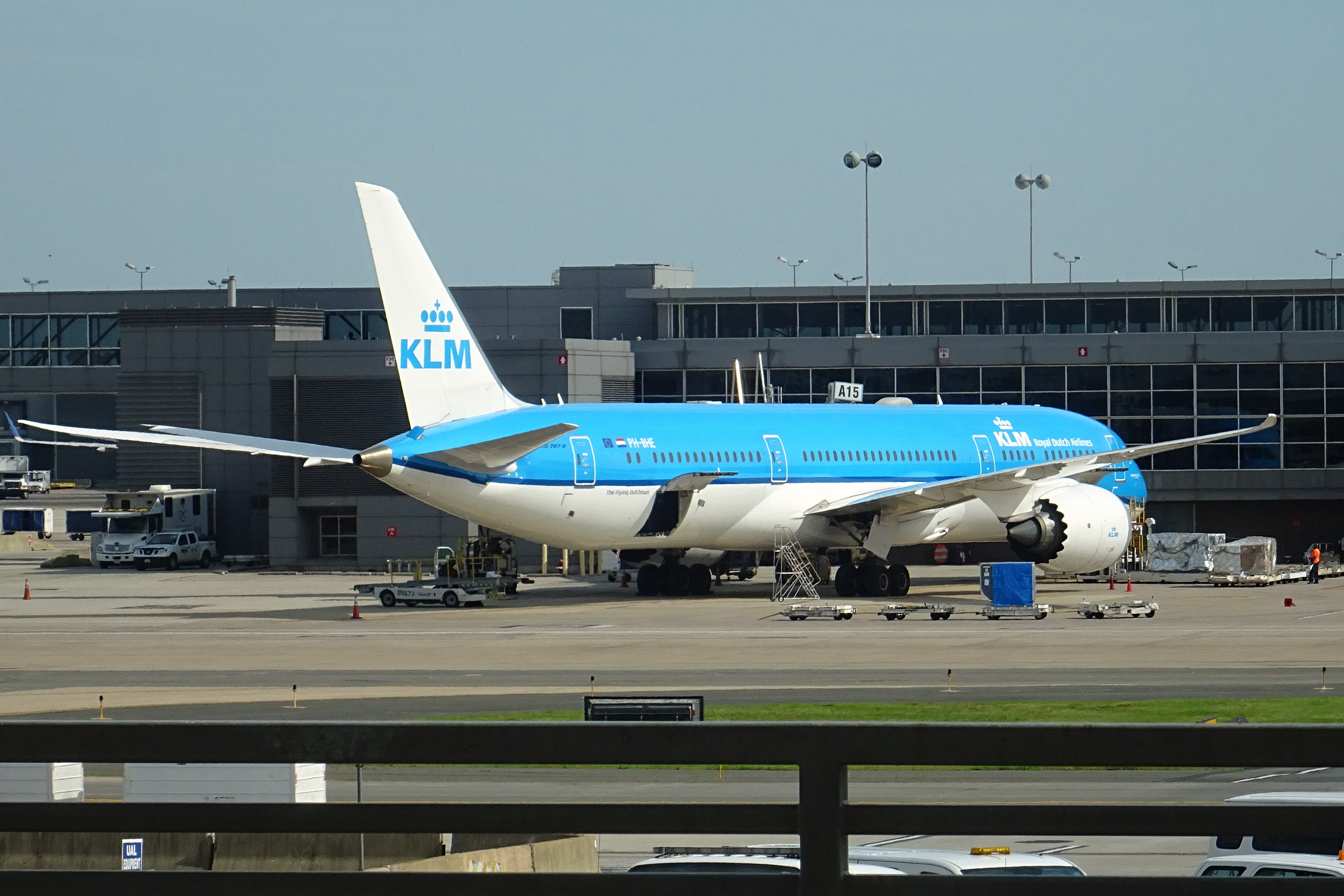
A KLM Boeing 787 aircraft serving Terminal A in June 2018.

Concourse B has 28 gates, located in the western half of the terminal. It is the first of the permanent elevated midfield concourses. Originally constructed in 1998 and designed by Skidmore, Owings & Merrill and Hellmuth, Obata and Kassabaum, the B concourse contained 20 gates. In 2003, 4 additional gates were added, followed by a 15-gate expansion in 2008. In addition to the AeroTrain station located between gates B51 and B62, Concourse B is also connected to the main terminal by an underground walkway. Concourse B is used by some international carriers, and is also utilized by almost all non-United domestic and Canada flights. The facility also includes a British Airways Galleries lounge adjacent to the AeroTrain station, a Lufthansa lounge between gates B49 and B51, and a Turkish Airlines lounge near gate B43.

==== Concourses C and D ====
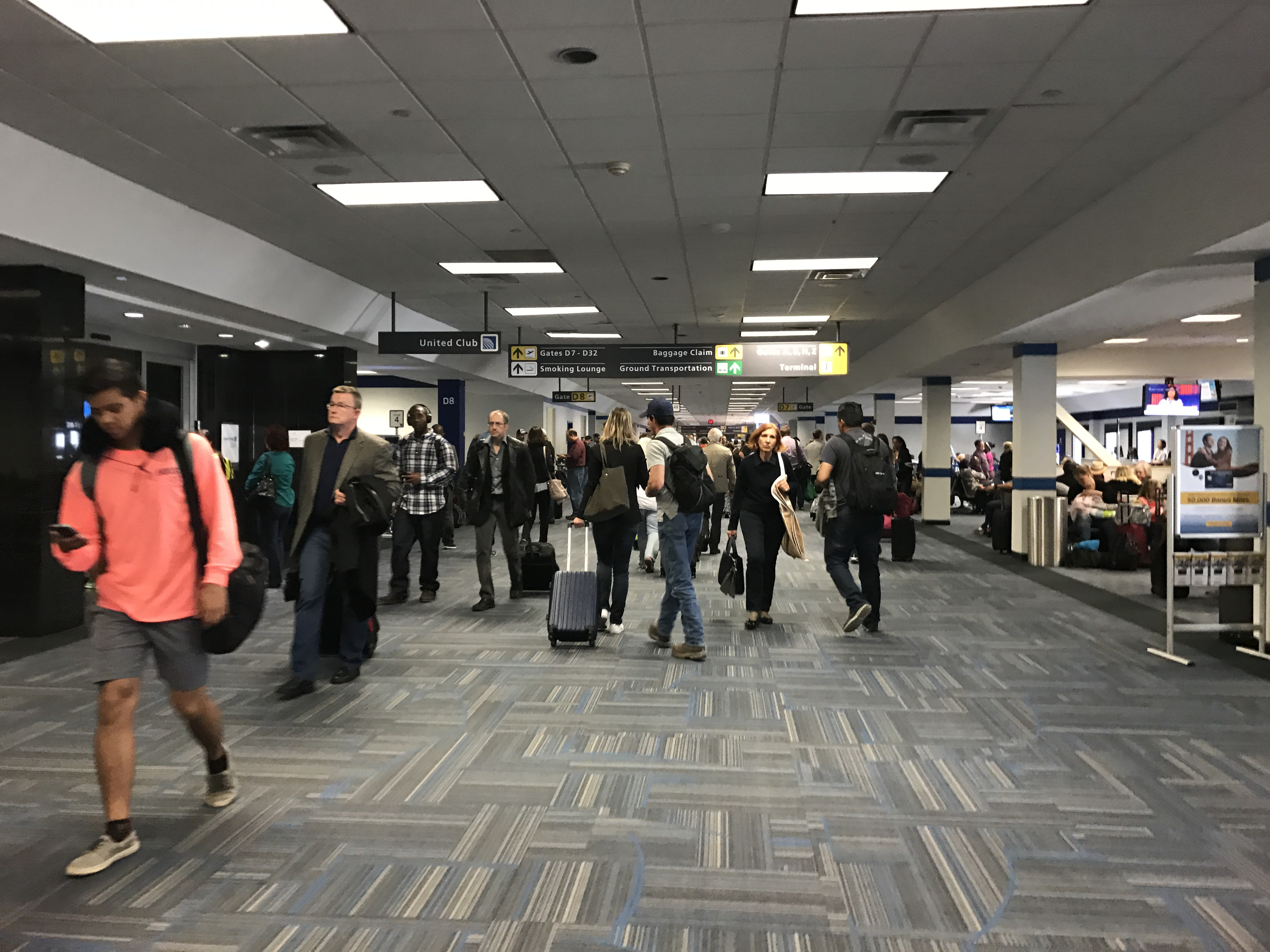
The interior of Concourse C and D, where United's hub operation is based.

Concourses C and D are located in the central midfield terminal, and are used for United Airlines flights, including all mainline flights and most United Express regional flights (save for a few that use Concourse A).

These concourses were constructed in 1983 as temporary facilities and designed by Hellmuth, Obata and Kassabaum. The two concourses have 22 gates each, numbered C1–C28 and D1–D32, with odd-numbered gates on the north side of the building and even numbered gates on the south side. Concourse C composes the eastern half of the terminal and Concourse D composes the western half. The C/D concourses were given a facelift in 2006 that included light-fixture upgrades, new paint finishes, new ceiling grids and tiles, heating and air conditioning replacement, and complete restroom renovations.

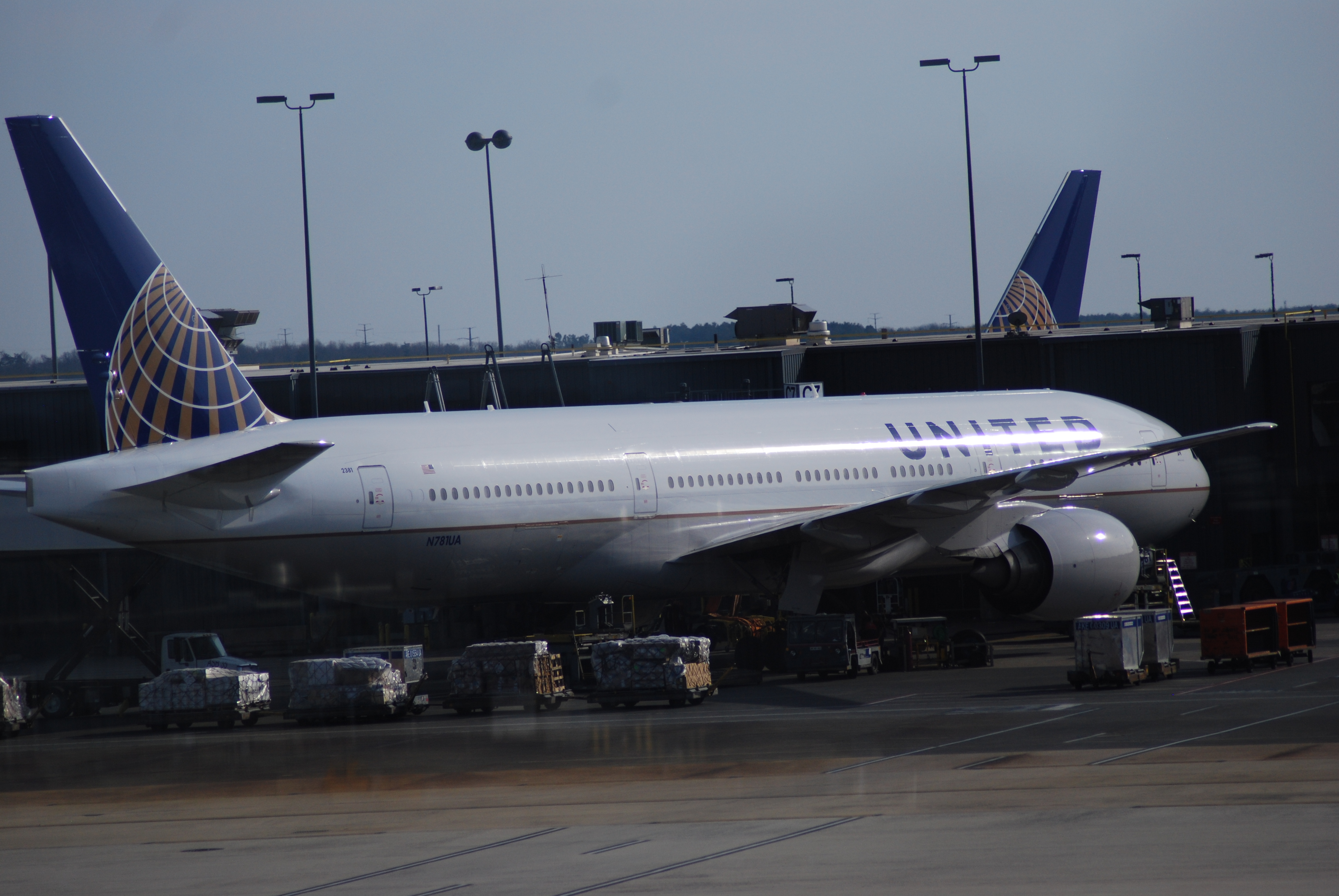
A pair of United Airlines Boeing 777-200 aircraft at Terminal C in February 2011.

While all gates in Concourses C/D can be utilized for both domestic and international departures, all United international arrivals are conducted at gates C1-C14. These gates contain two exit configurations depending on the arriving flight. Domestic passengers and international passengers from airports with U.S. customs pre-clearance exit directly into the concourse, while international arrivals from airports without border pre-clearance are redirected down a sterile corridor to U.S. Customs & Immigration. Passengers arriving from international destinations who are ending their journey at Dulles are then transported by mobile lounge to the International Arrivals Building, while passengers making onward connections are directed to a separate customs facility located on the ground floor of Concourse C. After being screened by TSA at a dedicated security checkpoint within the facility, these passengers then take escalators that deposit them in Concourse C near gate C7.

==== Concourse E ====
Concourse E, facing west from gate E3

Concourse E is the newest midfield terminal, located to the south of Concourse C. It is utilized exclusively by United flights. The concourse has 14 gates, numbered E1-E16, and can accommodate up to 14 narrowbody or 7 widebody aircraft. Each gate can be used for both domestic and international flights, with an overhead sterile walkway redirecting passengers from international arrivals onto mobile lounges in order to clear customs at the Concourse C facility or at the International Arrivals Building. The facility also features 44,000 square feet of dining and retail space, along with a 40,000 square foot United Club.

A replacement concourse for Concourses C and D (also called "Tier 2") had been proposed as part of the D2 Dulles Development Project. When built, it was planned that both terminals would be connected to the main terminal and other concourses via the AeroTrain. To that extent, the AeroTrain station at Concourse C was built at the location where the future Concourse C/D structure was proposed to be built, and connected to the existing Concourse C via an underground walkway. The new building was to include a three-level structure with 44 jetbridges and similar amenities to Concourse B. In April 2022, the Airport Authority published plans for a 14 gate Concourse E to be built atop the Concourse C AeroTrain station with the purpose of replacing outdoor boarding areas at Concourse A. Construction was expected to cost between $500 million and $800 million and the airport sought $230 million grants from the Bipartisan Infrastructure Bill. Construction on the concourse began in August 2024, and it opened to the public on November 10, 2026.

=== Airline lounges ===
Since many major domestic and international airlines have a large presence at Washington Dulles, there are many airline lounges within the airport:

- Air France / KLM: Air France/KLM Lounge, A Concourse across from gate A22.
- British Airways: BA Lounge for First class and Business class passengers (with Concorde Dining offered for First class passengers), located opposite the Concourse B Transit station.
- Capital One opened its second ever airport lounge at Dulles. It is operated by a third-party hospitality company and was opened on September 7, 2023, located in the main terminal just beyond the TSA PreCheck checkpoint.
- Etihad Airways: First and Business class lounge located adjacent to gate A14; managed by Chase and available to Chase Sapphire Reserve holders.
- Lufthansa: Senator Lounge and Business Lounge, B Concourse at gate B51.
- Turkish Airlines: Concourse B, near gate B41.
- United Airlines: Two United Clubs in Concourse C (at gates C7 and C17), one in Concourse D at gate D8, and one in Concourse E across from gates E14-E16. There is also a Polaris Lounge in Concourse C located directly across from gate C17.
- Virgin Atlantic: Clubhouse, Concourse A across from gate A32.

== Airlines and destinations ==
=== Passenger ===
Airlines	Destinations
Aer Lingus	Dublin
Aeroméxico	Mexico City–Benito Juárez
Air Canada	Seasonal: Toronto–Pearson
Air Canada Express	Montréal–Trudeau, Toronto–Billy Bishop, Toronto–Pearson
Air China	Beijing–Capital
Air France	Paris–Charles de Gaulle
Air Premia	Seoul–Incheon
Alaska Airlines	San Diego, Seattle/Tacoma
All Nippon Airways	Tokyo–Haneda
Allegiant Air	Asheville, Destin/Fort Walton Beach, Jacksonville (FL), Knoxville, Orlando/Sanford (begins May 21, 2027), Punta Gorda (FL), Sarasota, Savannah
American Airlines	Charlotte, Dallas/Fort Worth, Los Angeles
American Eagle	Charlotte
Austrian Airlines	Vienna
Avianca	Bogotá
Avianca Costa Rica	Guatemala City; Seasonal: San José (CR)
Avianca El Salvador	San Salvador
Boliviana de Aviación	Seasonal: Santa Cruz de la Sierra–Viru Viru
Breeze Airways	Provo, South Bend, Tri-Cities (TN) (ends November 30, 2026), Vero Beach
British Airways	London–Heathrow
Brussels Airlines	Seasonal: Brussels
Contour Airlines	Plattsburgh
Copa Airlines	Panama City–Tocumen
Delta Air Lines	Atlanta, Salt Lake City, Seattle/Tacoma; Seasonal: Detroit
Delta Connection	Detroit, Minneapolis/St. Paul, New York–JFK (ends February 10, 2027)
EgyptAir	Cairo
Emirates	Dubai–International
Ethiopian Airlines	Addis Ababa, Lomé
Etihad Airways	Abu Dhabi
EVA Air	Taipei–Taoyuan
Frontier Airlines	Atlanta, Dallas/Fort Worth, Fort Lauderdale, Las Vegas, Miami, Orlando, San Juan, Tampa; Seasonal: San Salvador
Iberia	Madrid
Icelandair	Reykjavík–Keflavík
ITA Airways	Rome–Fiumicino
KLM	Amsterdam
Korean Air	Seoul–Incheon
Lufthansa	Frankfurt, Munich
Porter Airlines	Toronto–Billy Bishop
Qatar Airways	Doha
Royal Air Maroc	Casablanca
Royal Jordanian	Amman–Queen Alia
Saudia	Jeddah, Riyadh
Scandinavian Airlines	Copenhagen
Southern Airways Express	Bradford (PA) (ends January 31, 2027), DuBois (PA) (ends January 31, 2027),
Sun Country Airlines	Seasonal: Minneapolis/St. Paul
Swiss International Air Lines	Zurich
TAP Air Portugal	Lisbon, Porto (begins March 31, 2027)
Turkish Airlines	Istanbul
United Airlines	Accra, Amsterdam, Aruba, Atlanta, Austin, Barbados, Barcelona, Boston, Brussels, Cancún, Cape Town, Cartagena (begins December 17, 2026), Charleston (SC), Chicago–O'Hare, Cleveland, Dallas/Fort Worth, Denver, Dublin, Edinburgh, Fort Lauderdale, Fort Myers, Frankfurt, Geneva, Hartford, Honolulu, Houston–Intercontinental, Jacksonville (FL), Lagos, Las Vegas, Lisbon, London–Heathrow, Los Angeles, Madrid, Mexico City–Benito Juárez, Miami, Milan–Malpensa (begins May 28, 2027), Munich, Nashville, New Orleans, Newark, Norfolk, Orange County, Orlando, Paris–Charles de Gaulle, Phoenix–Sky Harbor, Portland (OR), Providenciales, Punta Cana, Raleigh/Durham, Rome–Fiumicino, Sacramento, St. Thomas, Salt Lake City, San Antonio, San Diego, San Francisco, San José del Cabo, San Juan, São Paulo–Guarulhos, Seattle/Tacoma, Sint Maarten, Tampa, Tel Aviv, Tokyo–Haneda, Toulouse (begins April 26, 2027), Zurich; Seasonal: Albuquerque, Anchorage, Athens, Bozeman, Calgary, Columbus–Glenn, Eagle/Vail, Grand Cayman, Guatemala City, Hayden/Steamboat Springs, Jackson Hole, Montego Bay, Nice, Palm Springs, Pittsburgh, Portland (ME), Reykjavík–Keflavík, San José (CR), San Salvador, Vancouver, Venice, West Palm Beach
United Express	Albany, Bradford (PA) (begins February 1, 2027), Buffalo, Burlington (VT), Charleston (SC), Charlotte, Charlottesville (VA), Cincinnati, Clarksburg (WV), Cleveland, Columbia (SC), Columbus–Glenn, Dayton, Detroit, Greensboro, Greenville/Spartanburg, Harrisburg, Hartford, Huntsville, Indianapolis, Ithaca, Johnstown (PA), Kansas City, Knoxville, Lancaster (PA) (begins March 2, 2027), Louisville, Lynchburg, Manchester (NH), Minneapolis/St. Paul, Mobile–Regional, Montréal–Trudeau, Morgantown (WV), New York–LaGuardia, Newark, Norfolk, Ottawa, Owensboro, Philadelphia, Pittsburgh, Portland (ME), Providence, Richmond, Roanoke, Rochester (NY), St. Louis, Savannah, South Bend, State College, Syracuse, Toronto–Pearson, Wilkes-Barre/Scranton; Seasonal: Atlanta, Halifax, Jacksonville (FL), Key West, Myrtle Beach, Nassau, New Orleans, Québec City, Raleigh/Durham, Traverse City
Virgin Atlantic	London–Heathrow
Volaris	Guadalajara
Volaris El Salvador	San Salvador
WestJet	Seasonal: Calgary

=== Cargo ===
Airlines	Destinations
FedEx Feeder operated by Mountain Air Cargo	Newark

== Statistics ==
=== Top destinations ===
==== Domestic ====
Busiest domestic routes to and from IAD (September 2025 – August 2026)
Rank	Airport	Passengers	Carriers
1	Denver, Colorado	559,638	United
2	San Francisco, California	467,137	United
3	Atlanta, Georgia	463,477	Delta, Frontier, United
4	Los Angeles, California	413,341	American, United
5	Orlando, Florida	331,677	Frontier, United
6	Chicago–O'Hare, Illinois	301,343	United
7	Houston–Intercontinental, Texas	264,129	United
8	Dallas/Fort Worth, Texas	262,184	American, Frontier, United
9	Seattle/Tacoma, Washington	258,680	Alaska, Delta, United
10	Boston, Massachusetts	221,557	United

==== International ====
Busiest international routes from IAD (September 2025 – August 2026)
Rank	Airport	Passengers	Carriers
1	London–Heathrow, United Kingdom	793,857	British Airways, United, Virgin Atlantic
2	Frankfurt, Germany	621,275	Lufthansa, United
3	San Salvador, El Salvador	616,053	Avianca Costa Rica, Avianca El Salvador, United, Volaris El Salvador
4	Paris–Charles de Gaulle, France	489,361	Air France, United
5	Istanbul, Turkey	359,040	Turkish Airlines
6	Munich, Germany	331,159	Lufthansa, United
7	Dublin, Ireland	305,206	Aer Lingus, United
8	Panama City–Tocumen, Panama	301,617	Copa Airlines
9	Lisbon, Portugal	291,779	TAP Air Portugal, United
10	Tokyo-Haneda, Japan	278,430	All Nippon Airways, United

=== Airline market share ===
Largest airlines at IAD (September 2025 – August 2026)
Rank	Airline	Passengers	Market share
1	United Airlines	18,368,922	67.6%
2	Delta Air Lines	999,432	3.7%
3	Frontier Airlines	534,770	2.0%
4	American Airlines	515,201	1.9%
5	Lufthansa	451,859	1.7%
–	Other	6,300,000	23.2%

=== Annual traffic ===
Annual passenger traffic at IAD 1979–present
Year	Passengers	Year	Passengers	Year	Passengers	Year	Passengers	Year	Passengers
1979	3,525,054	1989	10,399,091	1999	15,638,263	2009	22,556,923	2019	24,019,866
1980	2,624,398	1990	10,029,535	2000	15,778,621	2010	22,949,572	2020	7,892,355
1981	2,324,585	1991	10,486,009	2001	13,905,584	2011	22,473,122	2021	14,527,504
1982	2,609,933	1992	10,130,686	2002	14,274,119	2012	21,859,587	2022	20,698,191
1983	3,019,789	1993	9,183,600	2003	16,406,977	2013	21,347,225	2023	24,472,462
1984	3,555,771	1994	9,655,162	2004	22,185,643	2014	20,993,348	2024	26,497,286
1985	5,237,277	1995	10,478,409	2005	26,340,927	2015	20,970,412	2025	27,932,034
1986	9,131,895	1996	11,014,021	2006	22,454,287	2016	21,355,323	2026	
1987	10,950,211	1997	11,652,289	2007	23,992,335	2017	22,233,443	2027	
1988	9,686,637	1998	12,576,153	2008	23,170,346	2018	23,493,221	2028	

== Ground transportation ==
=== Roads ===
Washington Dulles is accessible via the Dulles Access Road/Dulles Greenway (State Route 267) and State Route 28. The Access Road is a toll-free, limited access highway owned by the Metropolitan Washington Airports Authority (MWAA) to facilitate car access to Washington Dulles from the Capital Beltway and Interstate 66. After it opened, non-airport traffic between Washington and Reston became so heavy that a parallel set of toll lanes were added on the same right-of-way to accommodate non-airport traffic (Dulles Toll Road). The airport-only lanes are both less congested and toll-free. As of November 1, 2008, MWAA assumed responsibility from the Virginia Department of Transportation both for operating the Dulles Toll Road and for the construction of the Silver Line down its median. Route 28, which runs north–south along the eastern edge of the airport, has been upgraded to a limited access highway, with the interchanges financed through a property tax surcharge on nearby business properties. The Dulles Toll Road (VA-267) is extended to the south of Leesburg as the Dulles Greenway.

=== Public transportation ===
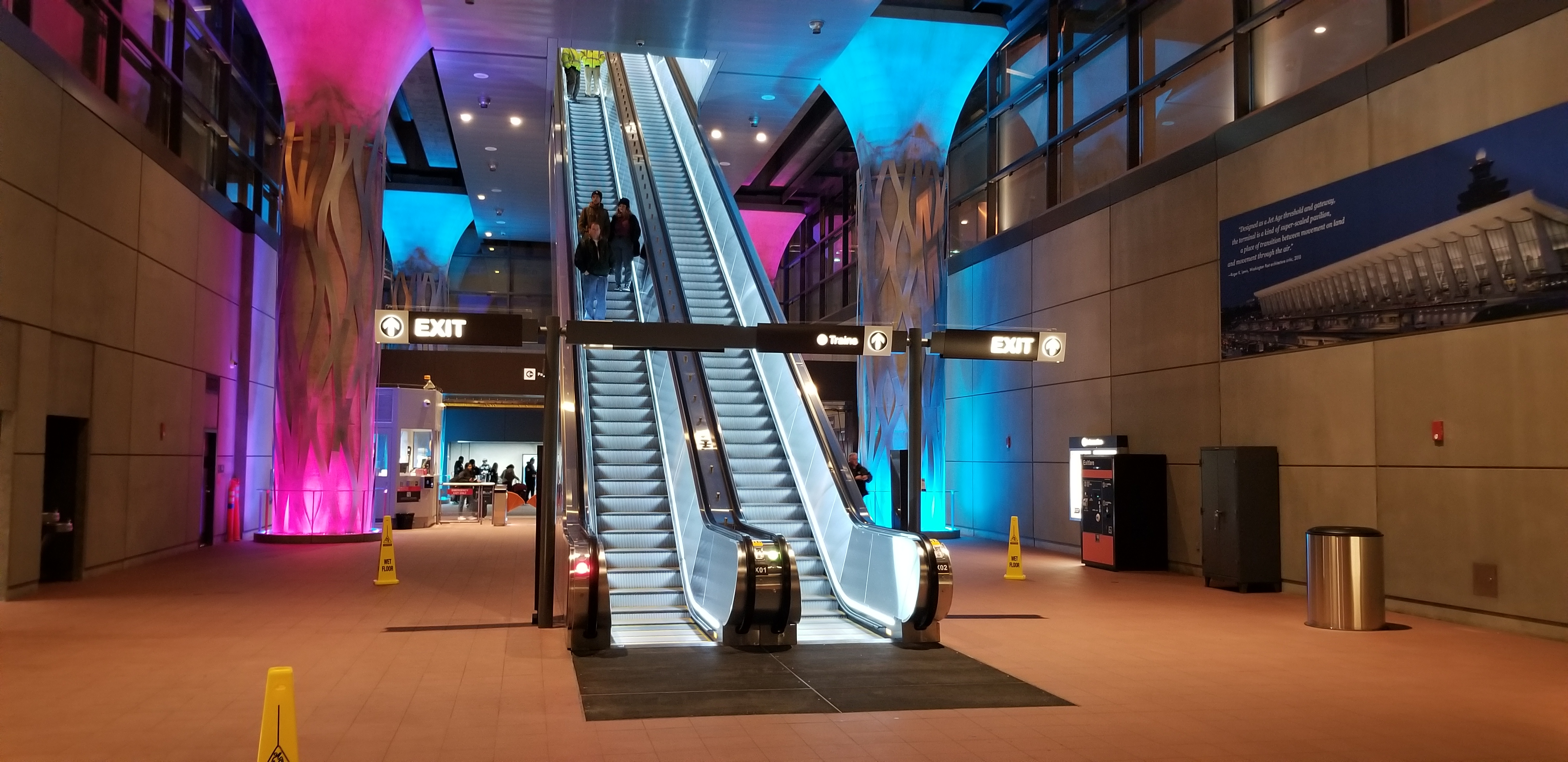
The Dulles Airport Station of the Washington Metro is part of the system's Silver Line.

Washington Metro service is available to Dulles via the station on the Silver Line. Service began operation on November 15, 2022.

Fairfax Connector bus routes 952 (to Herndon station, Reston Town Center station, and Wiehle–Reston East station via Sunset Hills Road) and 983 (to Innovation Center station and Steven F. Udvar-Hazy Center) serve Washington Dulles at the Kiss and Fly near the airport Metro station (moved from a terminal-adjacent stop in November 2025). Formerly, the Metrobus 5A route served the airport.

Megabus provides service from Dulles to Charlottesville and Blacksburg.

Washington Flyer has a monopoly to operate cabs from Washington Dulles Airport. Uber and Lyft are popular modes of transport to and from the airport, and MWAA receives a $4 fee per trip, which is included in the quoted fare.

== Accidents and incidents ==
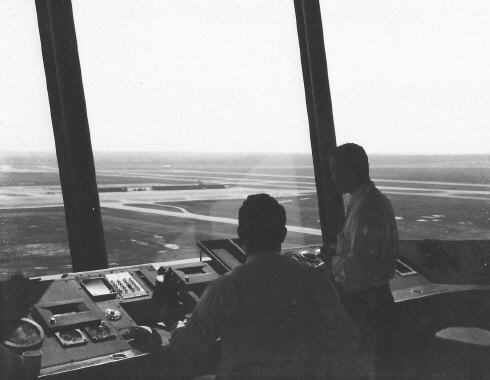
Control tower view of IAD in 1961

- On October 1, 1965, a Cessna 182 crashed on approach to Dulles Airport in a field in Chantilly, killing all four occupants on board.
- There were three deaths during a nine-day air show held at Washington Dulles in conjunction with Transpo '72 (officially called the U.S. International Transportation Exposition, a $10 million event sponsored by the U.S. Department of Transportation, and attended by over one million visitors from around the world).
  - On May 29, 1972, the third day of the show, the pilot of a Kite Rider (a variety of hang glider) was killed in a crash. This was to be the first of the three air deaths during the Air Show.
  - On June 3, 1972, a second death occurred at the Transpo '72 Air Show, during a sport plane pylon race. At 2:40 pm, during the second lap and near a turn about pylon 3, a trailing aircraft's (LOWERS R-1 N66AN) wing and propeller hit the right wing tip of a leading aircraft (CASSUTT BARTH N7017). The right wing immediately sheared off the fuselage, and the damaged aircraft crashed almost instantly, killing the 29-year-old pilot, Hugh C. Alexander. He was a professional Air Racer with over 10,200 hours.
  - On June 4, 1972, during the last day of the 9-day Transpo '72 Air Show, the U.S. Air Force Thunderbirds experienced their first fatal crash at an air show. Major Joe Howard flying Thunderbird 3 was killed when his F-4E-32-MC Phantom II, 66-0321, lost power during a vertical maneuver. The pilot broke out of formation just after he completed a wedge roll and was ascending at around 2,500 feet (760 m) AGL. The aircraft staggered and descended in a flat attitude with little forward speed. Although Major Howard ejected as the aircraft fell back to earth from about 1,500 feet (460 m) tail first, and descended under a good canopy, winds blew him into the fireball ascending from the blazing crash site. The parachute melted and the pilot plummeted 200 feet (61 m), sustaining fatal injuries.
- On December 1, 1974, while diverting to Washington Dulles, TWA Flight 514 crashed onto the western slope of Mount Weather. All 85 passengers and 7 crew members were killed on impact.
- On July 21, 1979, one month after a previous tire incident involving an Air France Concorde, another Concorde blew several of its landing gear tires during takeoff. After that second incident the "French director general of civil aviation issued an air worthiness directive and Air France issued a Technical Information Update, each calling for revised procedures. These included required inspection of each wheel/tire for condition, pressure and temperature prior to each take-off. In addition, crews were advised that landing gear should not be raised when a wheel/tire problem is suspected."
- On July 20, 1988, a Fairways Corp. de Havilland Canada DHC-6 Twin Otter stalled and crashed after takeoff. The sole occupant, the pilot, was killed.
- On June 18, 1994, a Learjet 25 operated by Mexican carrier TAESA crashed in trees while approaching the airport from the south. 12 people died. The passengers were planning to attend the 1994 FIFA World Cup soccer games being staged in Washington, D.C.
- On September 11, 2001, American Airlines Flight 77 took off from Dulles Airport out of Gate D26 bound for Los Angeles. It was deliberately crashed into the Pentagon at 9:37 am EDT by al-Qaeda terrorists, killing everyone on board. Now, an American flag flies over Gate D26.

== In popular culture ==
Dulles has been a popular filming location, particularly in its early years when it had relatively low traffic levels in relation to its size and its elaborate design.

- The airport featured extensively in the Airport film franchise – in all but the first film of the series. In particular, both Airport 1975 and Airport '79 contain scenes shot both inside and outside the main terminal building in its pre-extended state. Also shown is the mobile lounge system operating in its original form when the lounges directly docked with aircraft on the apron. Airport '77 contains a night-time view of the terminal with a Boeing 747 taking off in the foreground.
- Die Hard 2 was set at Dulles, but in fact contains no footage actually shot at the airport. Only the movie poster has an image of the main terminal.

== See also ==
- Busiest airports in the United States by international passenger traffic
- List of airports with triple takeoff/landing capability
- List of thin shell structures
- Thin-shell structure
- List of tallest air traffic control towers in the United States
