= United Club =

Airport lounge of United Airlines

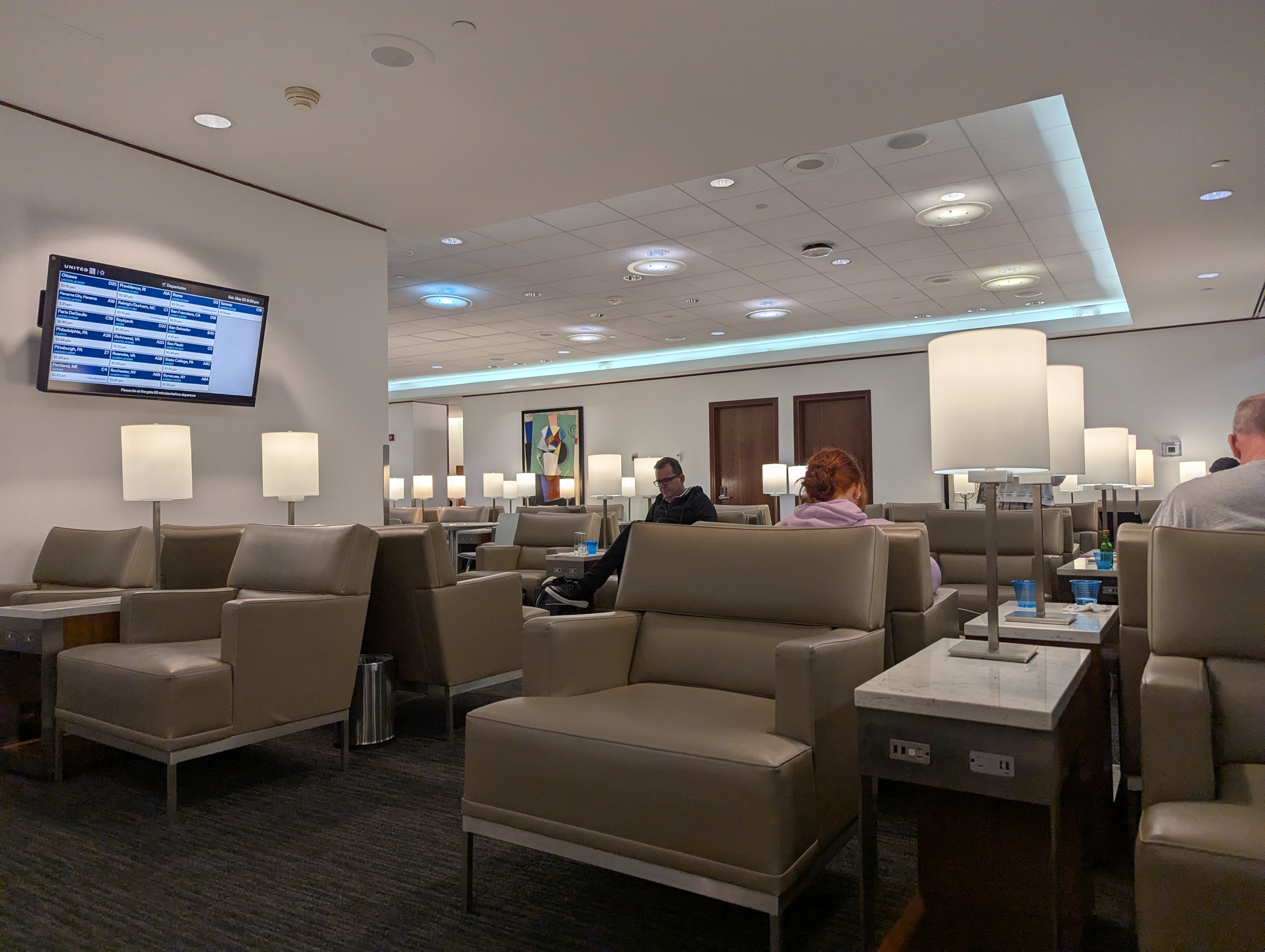
A United Club at Dulles International Airport outside Washington, D.C.

United Club is the airport lounge associated with United Airlines and its regional affiliates.

United operates fifty lounges at 45 major airports in six countries, with the vast majority being in the United States. United Clubs feature complimentary beverages, breakfast and afternoon snacks, complimentary Wi-Fi, power outlets, newspapers, and magazines. Lounges at some airports with international services provide shower facilities. Customers can access United Clubs by traveling in United Business (international and p.s. routes), United Polaris Business, and first or business class on Star Alliance carriers. United Star Alliance Gold members can access United Clubs when traveling on international itineraries and Star Alliance Gold members from other carriers can access United Clubs on any itinerary. United Club members, United Club Card holders, and United one-time pass holders (based on capacity constraints) also have access to United Clubs on any itinerary. Lastly, active military personnel, Air Canada Maple Leaf Club members, and Virgin Australia Gold, Platinum, and VIP Velocity Frequent Flyers (traveling on international itineraries) may access United Clubs.

Prior to the 2010 merger with Continental Airlines, United's lounges were known as the Red Carpet Club and Continental's lounges were known as Presidents Club. On October 1, 2011, United phased out the "Red Carpet Club" and "Presidents Club" names. Lifetime memberships that were previously available for purchase from the Presidents Club were converted to the United Club.

== United Polaris Lounges and the Arrivals Lounge (Previously Global First Lounges) ==
United used to maintain United Global First Lounges at six international airports (three in the US and three overseas) to accommodate Global First passengers. Global First Lounges featured complimentary food and alcoholic beverages and offered more privacy than United Club. Access to Global First Lounges was restricted to Global First passengers, Star Alliance First Class customers and Global Services passengers confirmed in Business Class. HON Circle members of the Lufthansa Miles and More frequent flyer program were also able to use the Global First lounges when traveling or connecting in Lufthansa Business Class.

The six Global First lounges were located at United's hubs in Chicago (O'Hare International Airport), San Francisco, Tokyo (Narita International Airport), Washington (Dulles international Airport), Hong Kong, and London (Heathrow Airport), and Los Angeles.

Currently, United has Polaris Lounges at all of their mainland US hubs with the exception of Denver International Airport. Upcoming lounges include Tokyo Narita, London Heathrow, and Hong Kong. Access is allowed for United Polaris business class passengers and eligible business and first-class passengers on long-haul Star Alliance flights. Guests are not allowed in with the passenger unless the passenger is traveling in first-class on a long-haul Star Alliance flight.

London Heathrow has an Arrivals lounge in Terminal 2 that Polaris passengers have access to when arriving before 12pm GMT. This lounge is a partner lounge and is the only dedicated arrivals lounge in the United network.
